= Maxime Dethomas =

French painter and artist

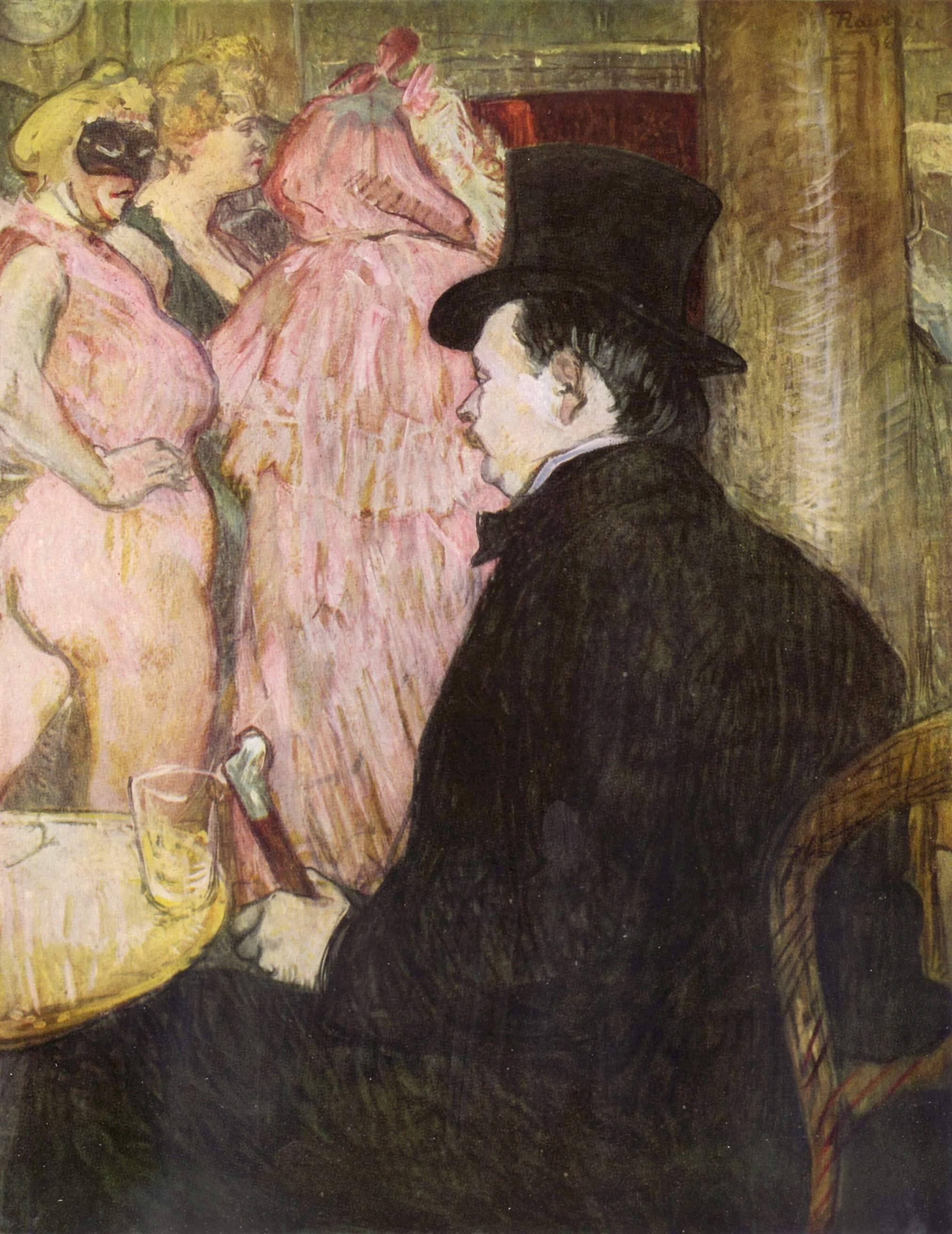
- Maxime Dethomas, 1896 by H.T. Lautrec
- Born: Maxime-Pierre Jules Dethomas; October 13, 1867; Garges-lès-Gonesse, France
- Died: 21 January 1929 (aged 61); Paris, France
- Known for: Painting, printmaking, drawing, illustration, theatre design
- Movement: Post-Impressionism, Symbolism
- Awards: Chevalier de la Légion d'honneur

Maxime-Pierre Jules Dethomas (French: [maksim dətɔma]; October 13, 1867 – January 21, 1929) was a French painter, draughtsman, printmaker, illustrator, and was among the best known theater-set and costume designers of his era. As an artist, Dethomas was highly regarded by his contemporaries and exhibited widely, both within France and abroad. He was a regular contributor to the Impressionistes et Symbolistes, and a founding committee member of the Salon d'Automne. In 1912, he was awarded the Chevalier de la Légion d'honneur for his contributions to French art.

During the latter part of his career, he is remembered for his work overseeing set and costume design for the Théâtre des Arts and the Paris Opera. His works appear in many important national collections, including the Musée d'Orsay, the Hermitage Museum and the National Gallery of Art. A large collection of his theatrically related work is held at the Bibliothèque-Musée de l'Opéra National de Paris. Dethomas is also remembered for his close friendship with the artist Henri de Toulouse-Lautrec, his brother in-law Ignacio Zuloaga and his association with Les Nabis and other important Post-Impressionist and Symbolist artists and writers. Dethomas died in 1929 at the age of 61, and was buried at the Passy Cemetery, Paris.

== Early life and formal education ==
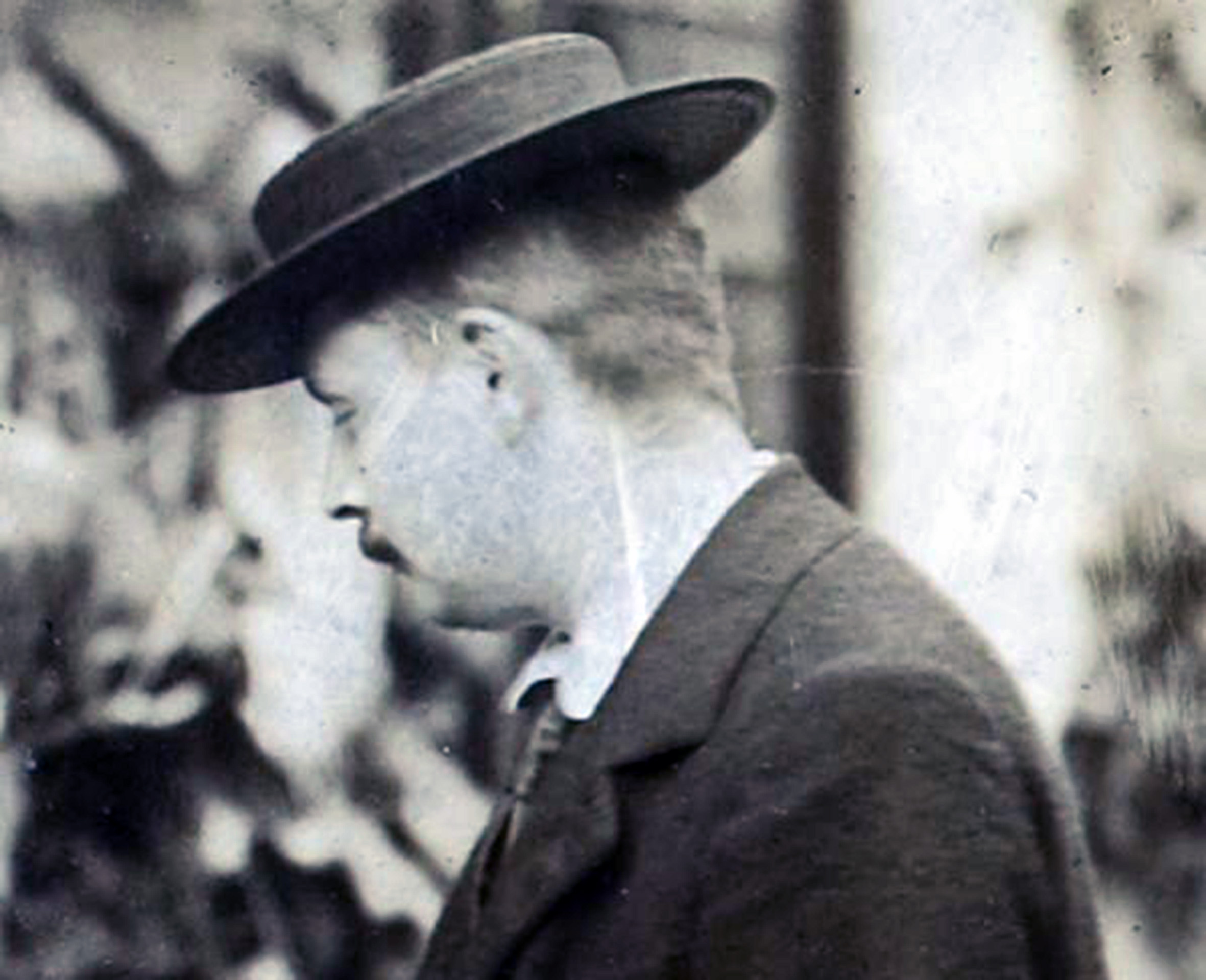
Maxime Dethomas c.1895

Born in the Paris suburb of Garges-lès-Gonesse in 1867, Maxime Dethomas was the eldest of six children, including four half-siblings. His family came from a long line of painter-printers on one side, and lawyers on the other. His father, Jean-Albert Dethomas (1842–1891), was an important Parisian politician and lawyer. His mother, Laure-Elizabeth Antoinette Béchet, died at the age of 27 in 1874. His step mother, Marie Louise Thierrée, belonged to the affluent middle-class of Bordeaux.

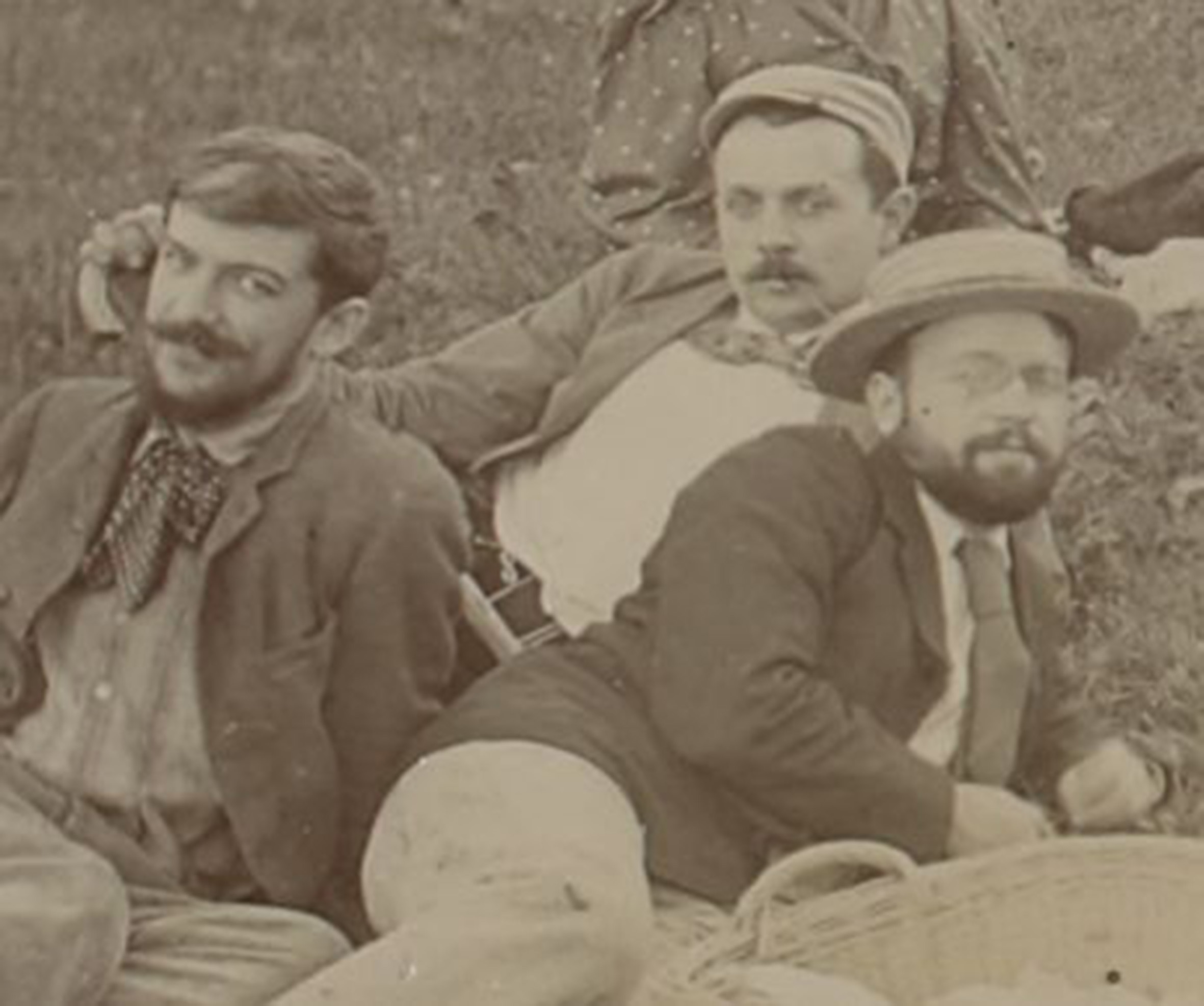
Maxime Dethomas (centre) with his artist companions (c. 1890)

During 1885, Dethomas first met Augustine Bulteau (1860–1922), matriarch of the Parisian arts community and one-time wife of prominent author and playwright, Jules Ricard (1848–1903). Bulteau would go on to become a pivotal figure in his life, helping him navigate a difficult relationship with his father, guiding his academic direction and encouraging his development as an artist. Each year, Dethomas would take extended breaks at Bulteau's estates in Léry and Venice – trips that would feature prominently in his art.

In 1887, Dethomas enrolled at the École des Arts Décoratifs at which he studied briefly, preferring instead to pass much of his time at the bookshop of the Revue Indépendante, a favourite haunt of young artists and writers run by Édouard Dujardin. It was here that he first met Louis Anquetin and Henri de Toulouse-Lautrec. It is an often repeated, yet erroneous claim that Dethomas' relationship with Toulouse-Lautrec was one of master and student – at least in the formal sense of the term – though their shared experiences and mutual respect for each other as artists was of undeniable consequence. In an 1898 letter, Dethomas reflected on Toulouse-Lautrec's art:

The things I see by him always give me an intense desire to work. The things of this boy, who, if he has no talent, certainly has a little genius, are always for me a whiplash [coup de fouet]. It's as if I was shown the way with a sudden invitation to advance. The master paintings do not give me that, we are stupefied with admiration. We are blocked, discouraged, after them we are let down, we are in prison.

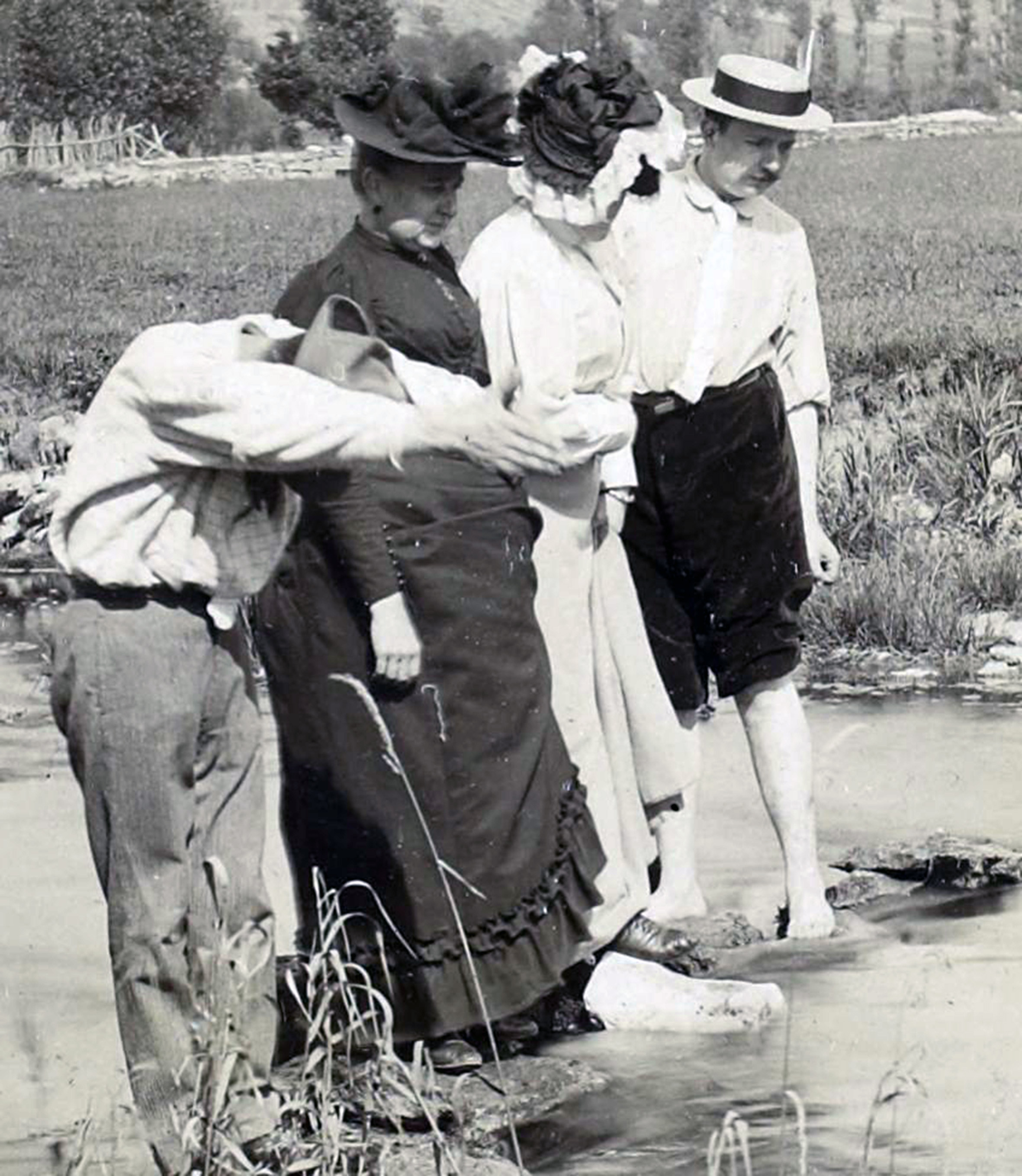
Maxime Dethomas (right) with Agustine Bulteau at Léry, Côte-d'Or (c.1890)

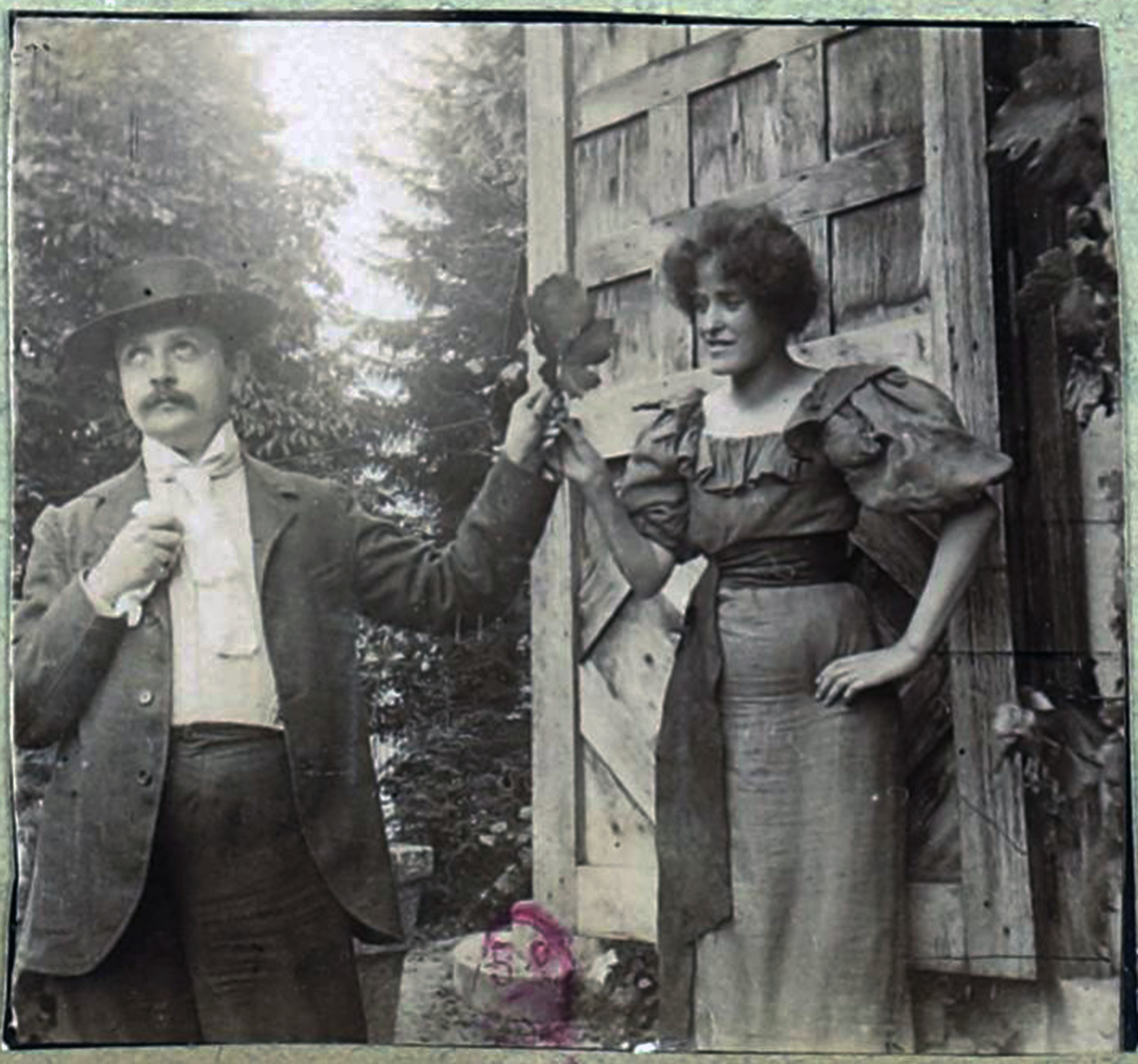
Maxime Dethomas and unknown model at the Bulteau Estate (c.1900)

Disgruntled with his experiences at the École des Arts Décoratifs, Dethomas began taking informal instruction at the private workshop of the young master, Henri Gervex. In 1888, Gervex began his tenure as instructor at l'Académie Libre on rue Verniquet – Dethomas applied and was accepted, continuing his formal education under Gervex. During this period, Dethomas became firm friends with fellow Gervex student and future brother-in-law, Ignacio Zuloaga. Through Dethomas, Zuloaga gained entrée into French artistic circles; reciprocally, Zuloaga introduced Dethomas to other Spanish expatriate artists, including the so-called Catalan Band: Santiago Rusiñol, Ramon Casas, and Miquel Utrillo.

The final phase of Dethomas' formal education commenced from 1891 onwards, where he followed a more varied course at the Académie de La Palette, 104 Boulevard de Clichy, Montmartre, under Henri Gervex, Puvis de Chavannes and Eugène Carrière. Carrière's tutelage played a significant role in the early development of Dethomas' art, and he would go on to be a close friend of both the artist and his family.

== Art ==
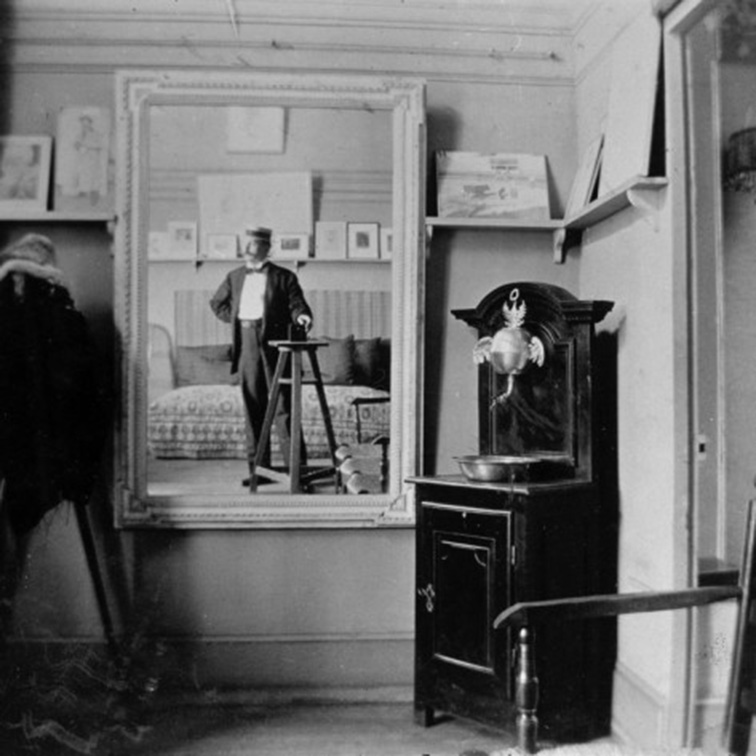
A self portrait captured by Maxime Dethomas in his Montmartre studio c.1895

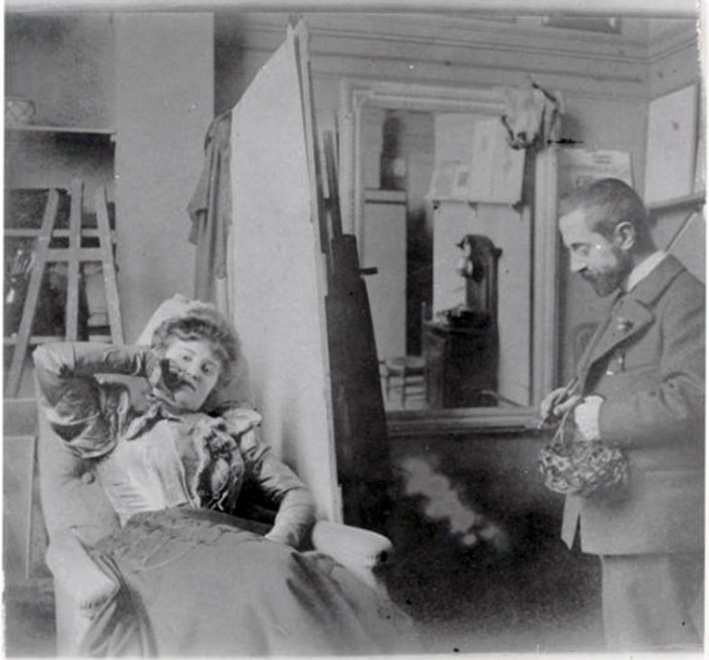
Henri de Toulouse-Lautrec and Misia Natanson in Maxime Dethomas' studio c.1895

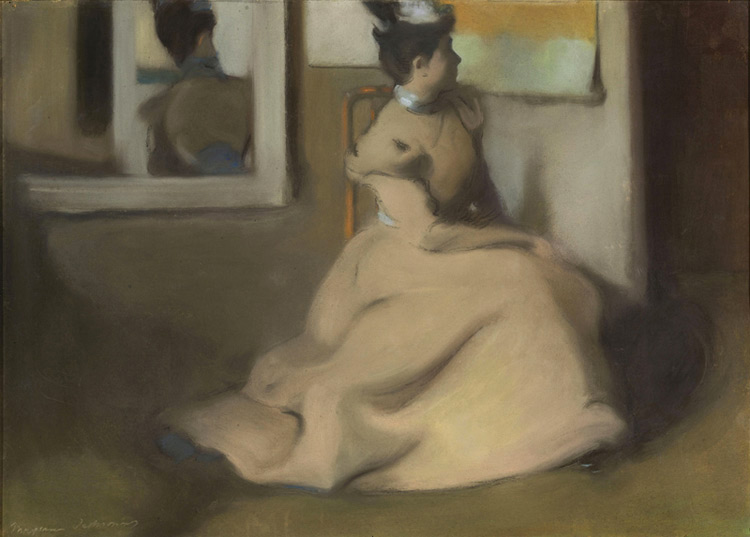
La dame au miroir - Maxime Dethomas c.1895. Pastel (67 x 47cm). Pushkin Museum, Moscow. Acquired by Shchukin in 1903 from Durand Ruel.

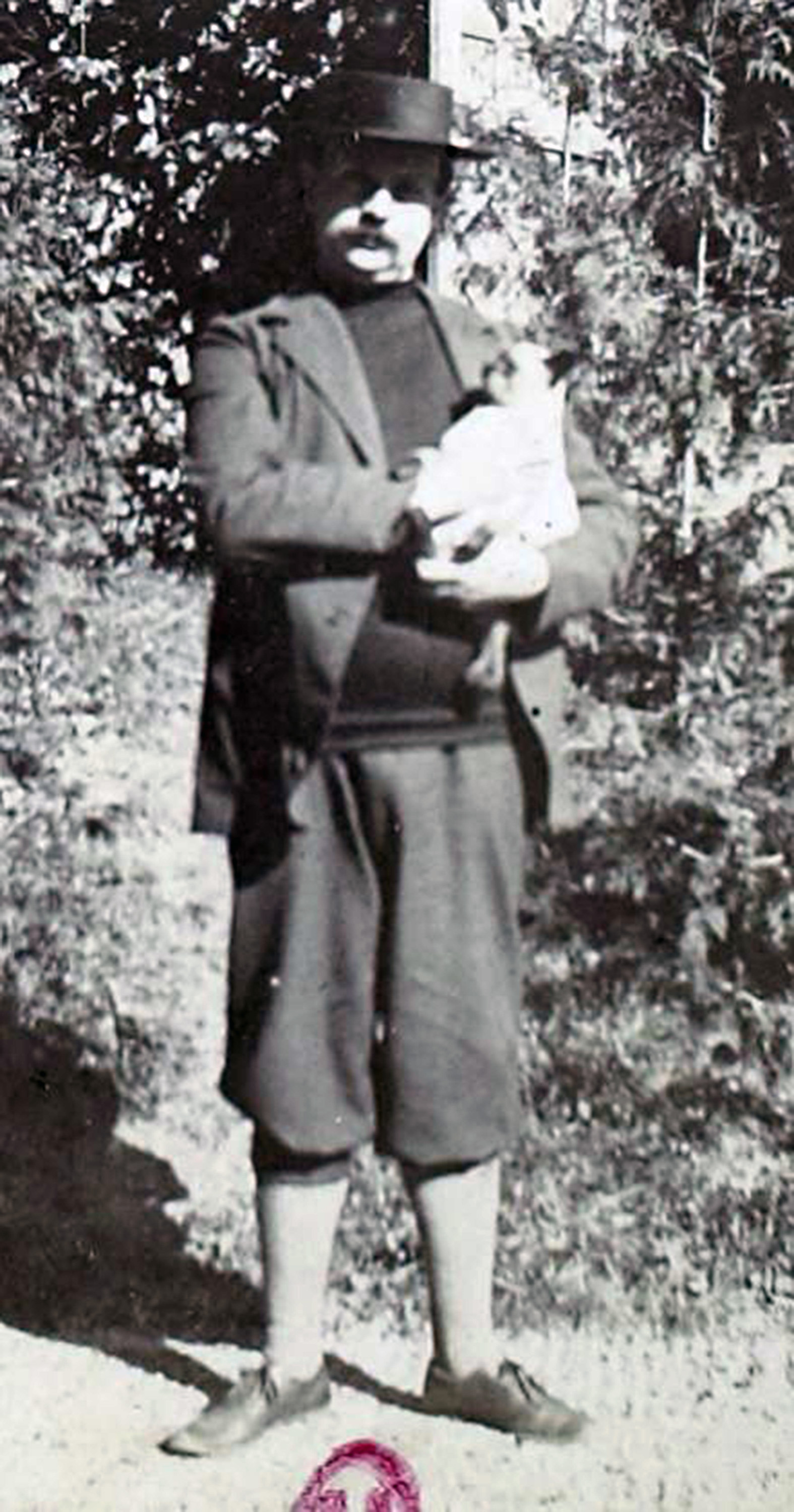
Maxime Dethomas with his Siamese cat (c.1900)

Dethomas' early style owes most to the influence of Carrière and Degas, whilst later works tend more towards that of Toulouse-Lautrec, Anquetin and Forain. Dethomas claimed that his inspiration was guided by artists of earlier generations, particularly Goya, Delacroix and Manet, but his individuality of style ensured he would "not be influenced in his work by any methods or thoughts other than his own". In 1905, influential critic Louis Vauxcelles praised Dethomas as a "shrewd and penetrating observer" that captured his subjects "with a powerful sobriety".

He realised vigorous drawings, and some few oil paintings, showing portraits, cafe scenes, and urban landscapes of Italy and Spain. He primarily worked with broad strokes in conté, graphite, charcoal and pastel, often enhanced by watercolour and the masterful use of the spatter brush, with drizzles and sprays of gouache reminiscent of Lautrec lithographs. From the late 1890s, he drew inspiration from Japanese prints – said to have been introduced to him by Toulouse-Lautrec – and developed a bold xylographic style which lent itself to woodcut reproduction.

Like many of his contemporaries, Dethomas explored various artistic mediums, including book illustrations, posters and print making. By 1895, he was designing programmes for Lugné-Poe's Théâtre de l'Œuvre and exhibition and advertising posters with print makers such as Edward Ancourt, Eugène Verneau and Auguste Clot. With his drawings engraved by Léon Pichon and Emile Gasperini, he illustrated close to thirty books by many prominent authors including Maurice Donnay and Octave Mirbeau.

Dethomas engaged models from both within his social circle, as well as otherwise unremarkable characters from urban life, searching out peculiarities of appearance that betrayed the social facades of the fin de siècle. Having cut ties with his bourgeois pretensions during an 1891 move to Montmartre, Dethomas followed in the footsteps of his mentors, hungry to find authentic expression of the human condition amongst the daily struggles of the urban poor. "His characters are all scoundrels", joked Degas. Two such 'scoundrels' would go on to lead remarkable lives, in no small part due to their association with Dethomas. Then artist's model Suzanne Desprès became romantically involved with Dethomas in June, 1894, and continued to feature prominently in his art for some years, later becoming a famous actress and wife of theater director Lugné-Poe. Prior to meeting Picasso in 1904, Fernande Olivier would also model for Dethomas with some regularity, her memoirs painting a vivid picture of her time in Dethomas' studio:

He was tall and stout, with a pallid complexion, the type of slightly fleshy giant who spent his nights making sketches in night clubs. He had great difficulty staying awake after meals, which for him always had to be enormous.

I used to arrive after lunch around two o'clock and would take up a pose, and he would begin to work. He had a litter of pretty little Siamese cats that would climb all over me or play with my bare feet in a way that was often quite fierce. Dethomas sketched, putting down a line on the paper or canvas with a steady hand, then he would get up, go and lie on the couch and fall asleep for at least an hour. During this time I was free to play with the cats, to read and eat the candies lying around in various dishes, even to sleep myself, in fact to wait for him to wake up in whatever way I felt like. And this happened frequently.

As soon as he woke we would work without a break until five o'clock. People would knock on his door, ring the bell, call to him, he would not move, he never answered. I often met Suzanne Desprès, who had been his model for a long time, there. It was at the outset of her acting career and she was already attracting attention.

Degas, an avid supporter of Dethomas, spoke highly of his work asserting "it has weight". Described by Philippe Berthelot as "le meilleur fils de Degas", Dethomas nonetheless exhibited sparingly during the 1890s. Contemporary accounts suggest a "supercilious modesty prevented him from over-exhibiting his work though no artists merchant forbade him". In a letter written by Lautrec in the summer of 1895 to Joseph Ricci, Lautrec refers to Dethomas as his dear friend and compliments him as a painter "who doesn’t talk about his paintings, something that is to be admired". Despite his early reluctance to exhibit, he participated in some of the most significant exhibitions of the 1890s. His first solo exhibition in 1900 marked a turning point in his willingness to accept notoriety, leading to considerable accolades and public recognition.

Dethomas' art passed through the hands of many prominent art dealers including Jos Hessel, Galerie Durand-Ruel and Galerie Druet. Consequently, many of his works were acquired by influential collectors including Olivier Sainsère and Sergei Shchukin. Dethomas is also known to have had his works framed by the frame-maker Pierre Cluzel (1850–1894), and his successor, Louis Vivien. Cluzel is the framer patronized by Edgar Degas, who was very concerned about presentation of his work. In 1912, Dethomas was awarded the Chevalier de la Légion d'honneur for his contributions to French art.

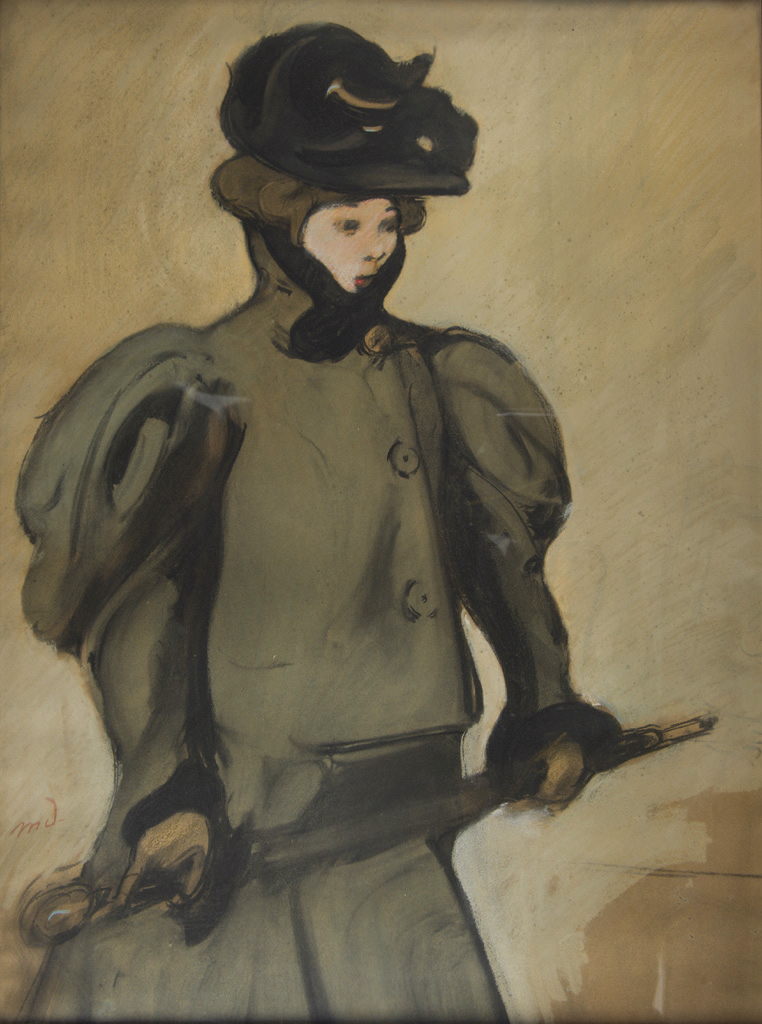
Maxime Dethomas: La femme au parapluie (1896). Musée des Beaux-Arts, Bordeaux.

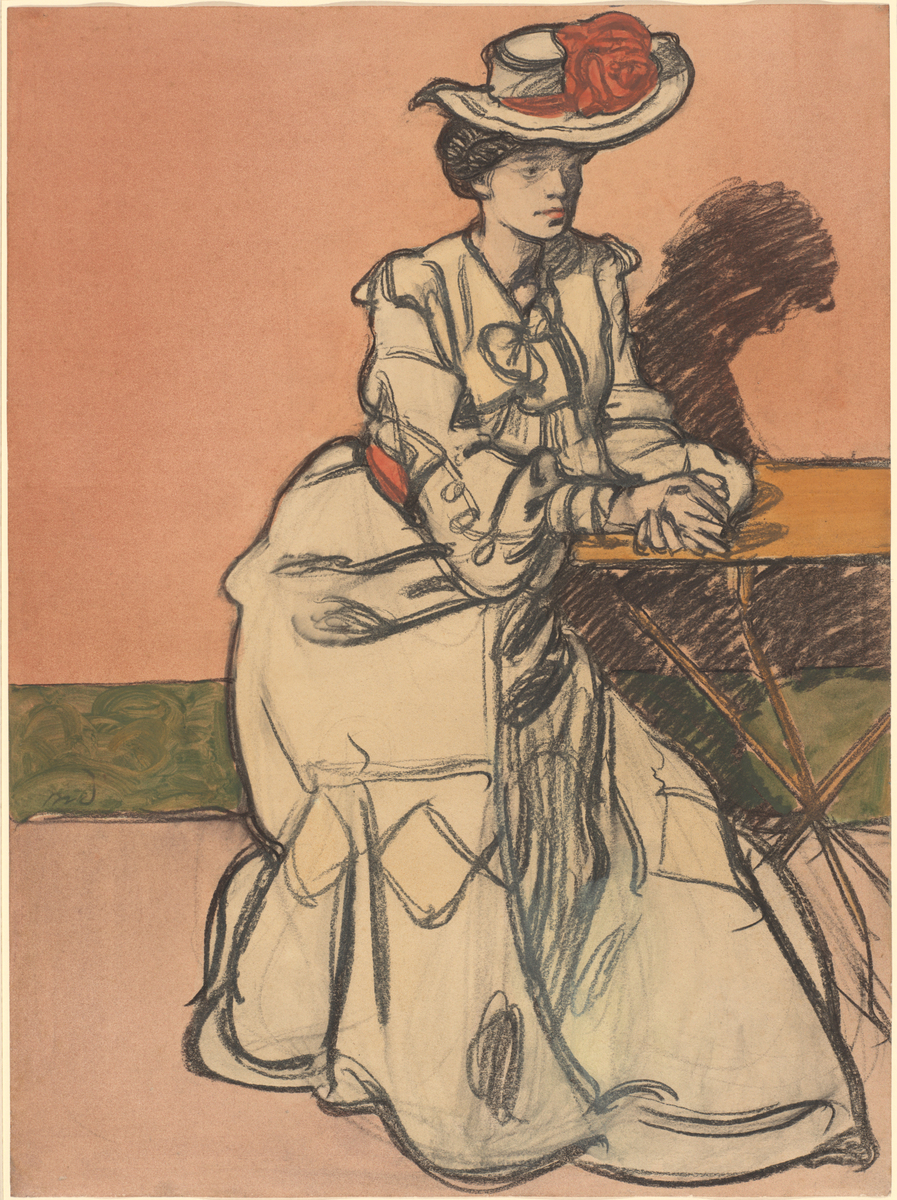
Maxime Dethomas: An Elegant Parisiènne Seated in a Café (c. 1895). N.G.A., Washington.

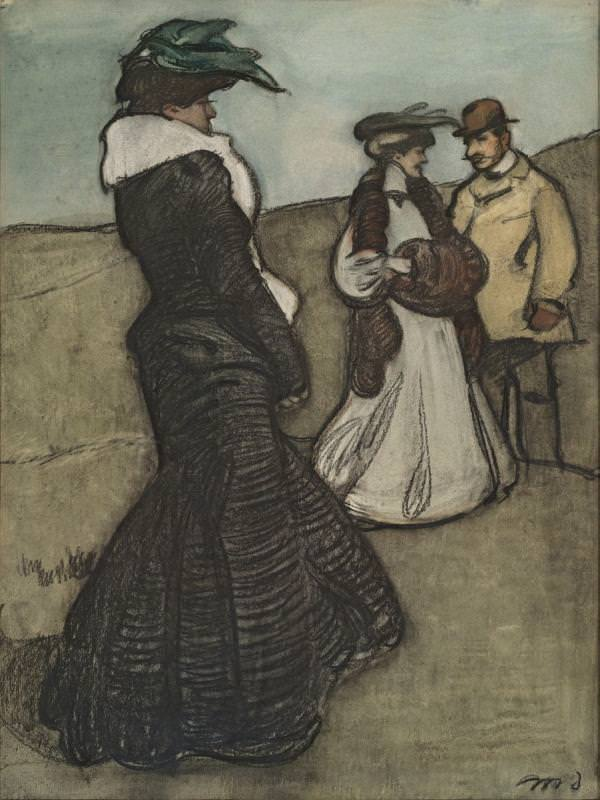
Maxime Dethomas: Medisants (c. 1895). Pushkin Museum, Moscow.

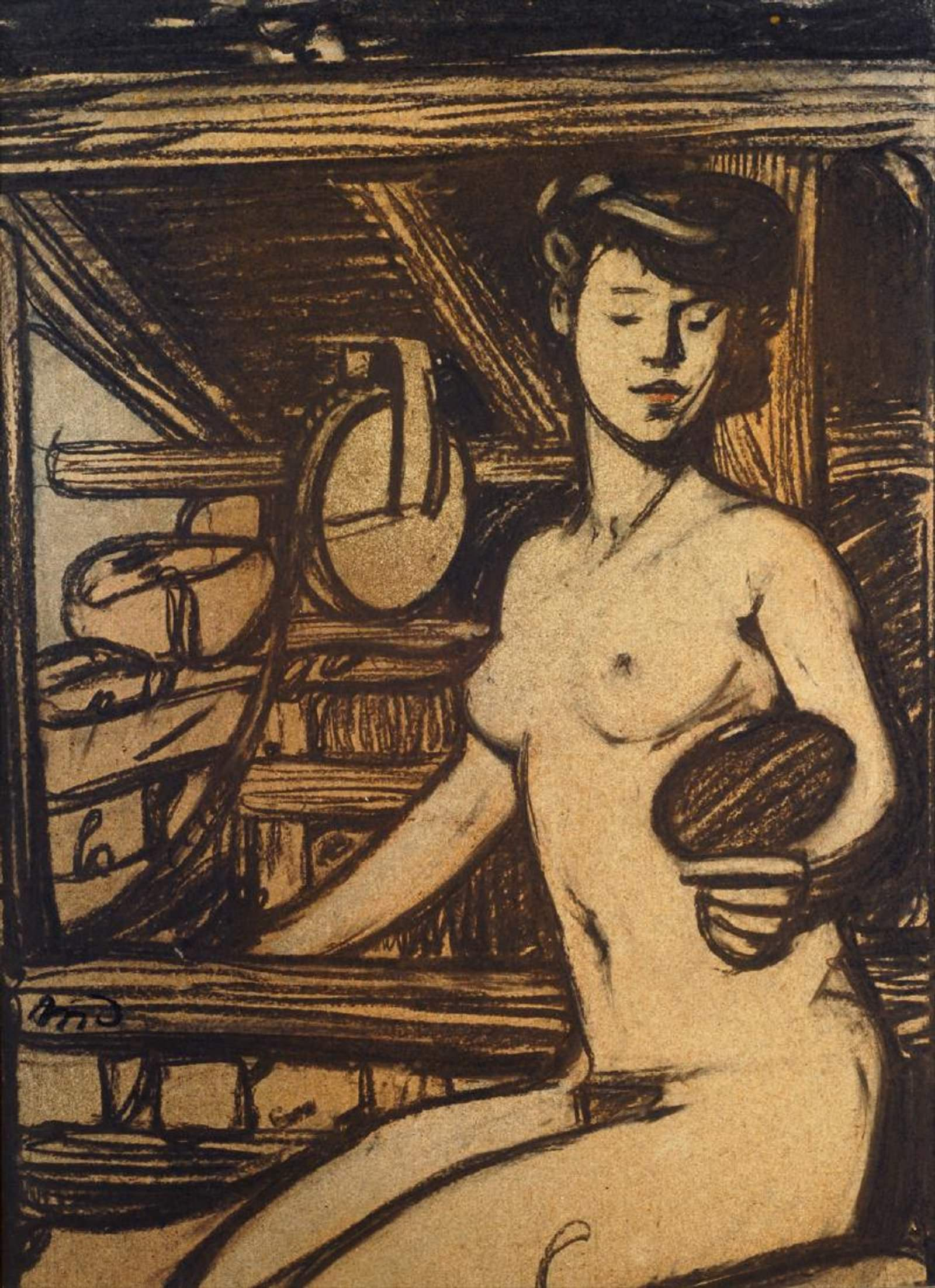
Maxime Dethomas: Woman in her bedroom (c.1895).

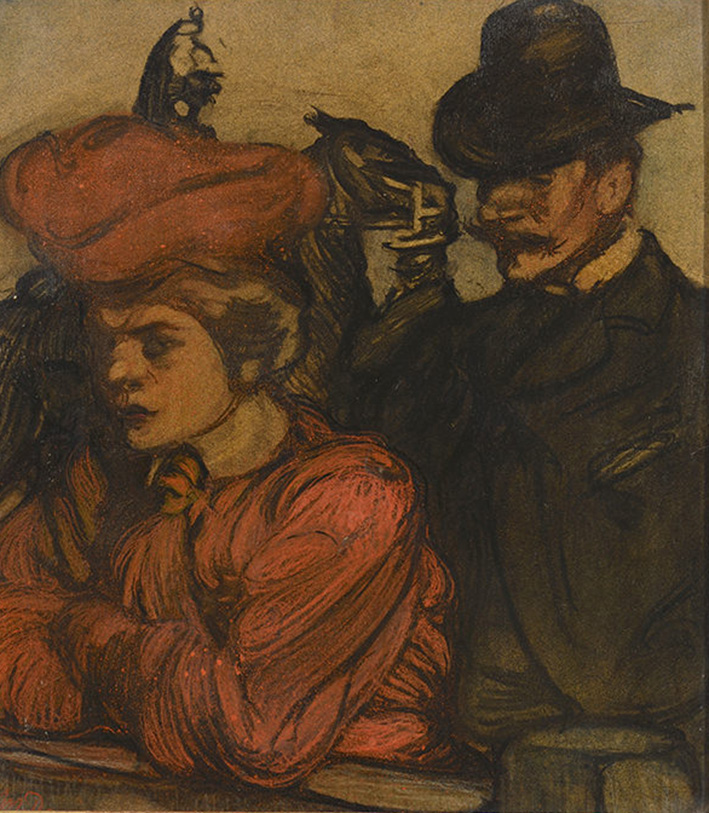
Maxime Dethomas: La boudeuse (1901). Ex. Galerie Hessel, Paris.

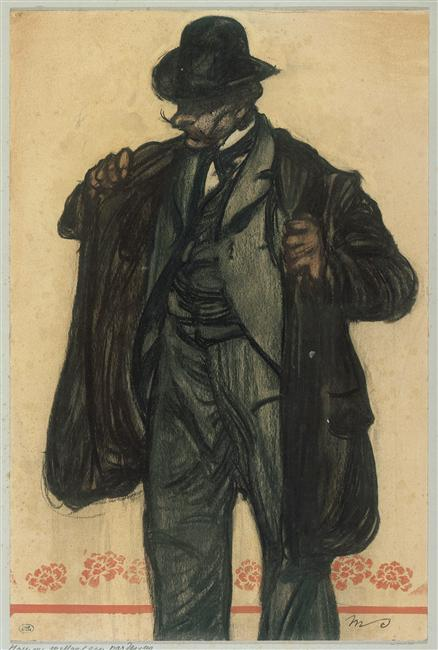
Maxime Dethomas: Homme mettant un pardessus (c. 1901). Palais des Beaux-Arts, Lille.

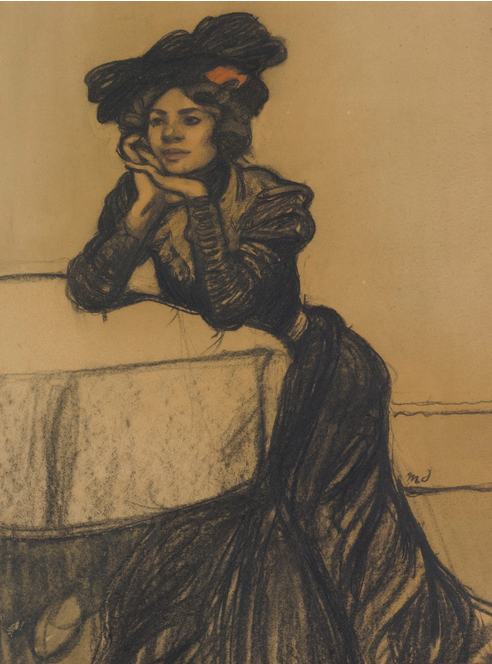
Maxime Dethomas: La cliente du Rat Mort (Sept. 1901).

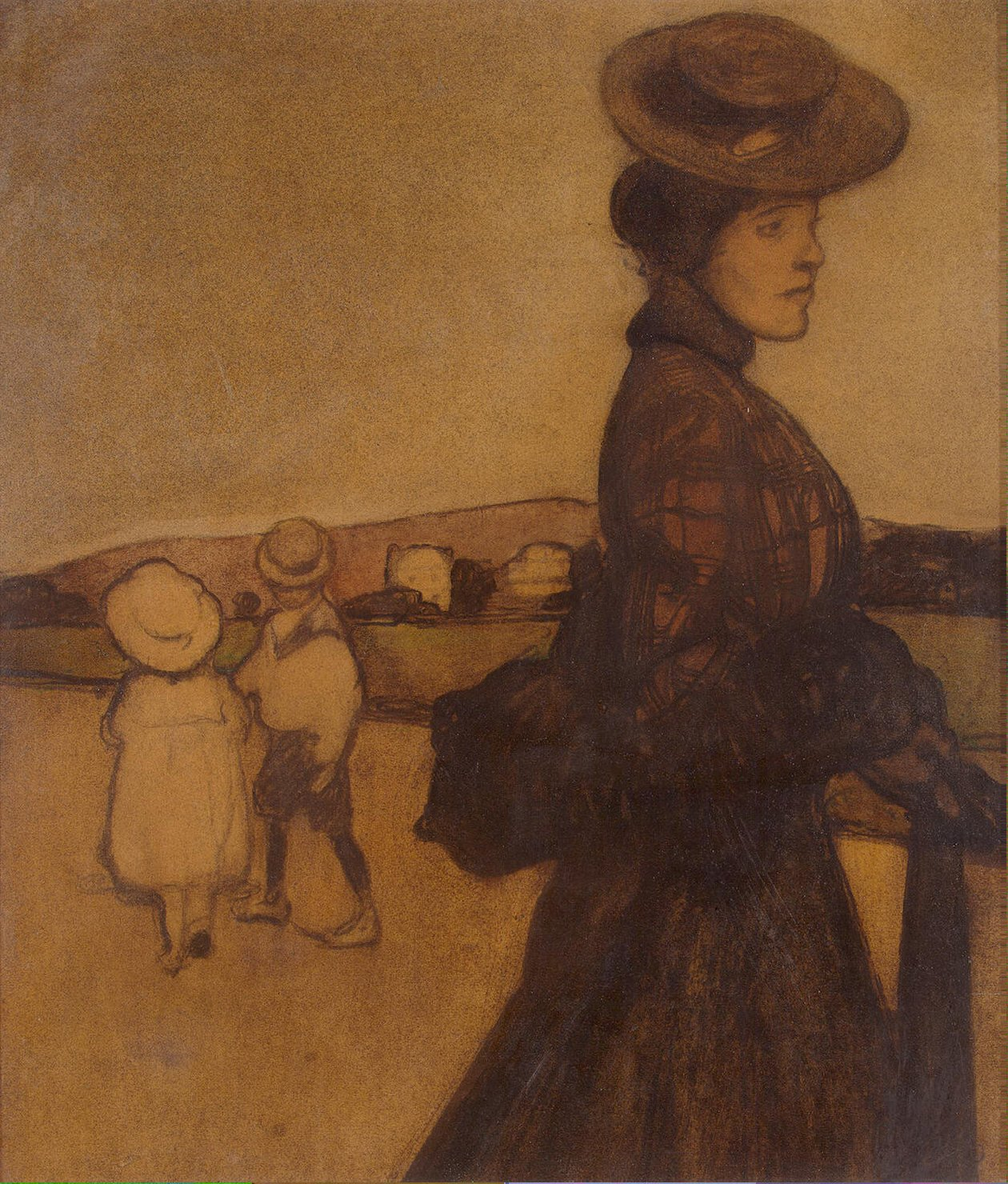
Maxime Dethomas: The Governess (c. 1901). Hermitage Museum, St. Petersburg.

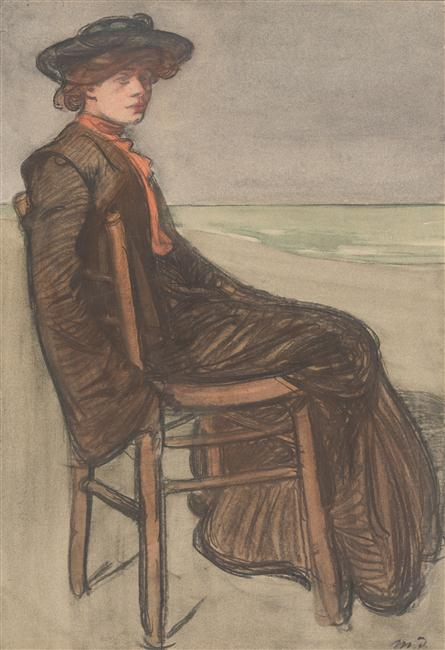
Maxime Dethomas: Femme assise sur la plage (L'Epave) (1903). Salon d’Automne, 1903, n°655. Musée des Beaux-Arts, Marseille.

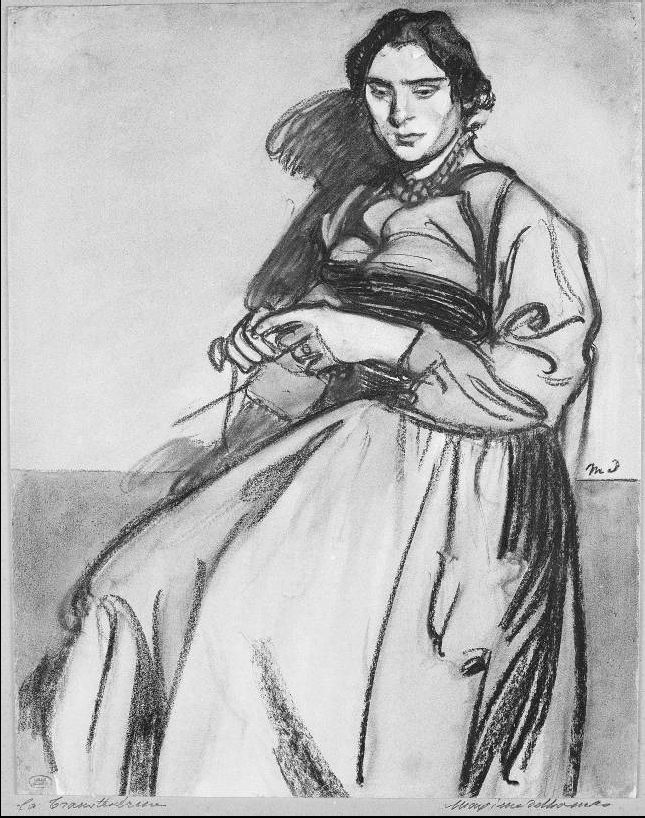
Maxime Dethomas: La Transtéverine (1904). Salon d’Automne, 1904, n°1420. Palais des Beaux-Arts, Lille.

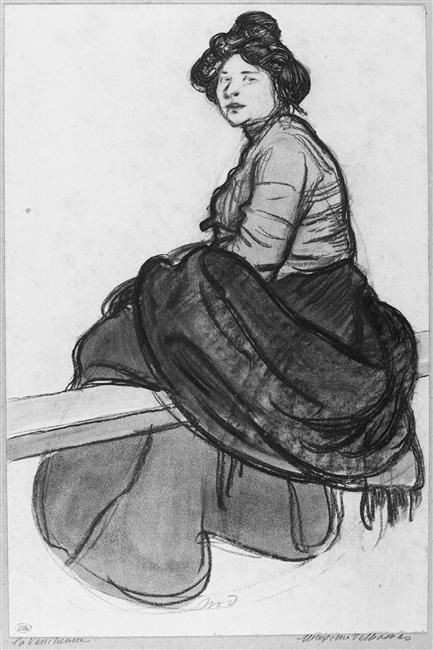
Maxime Dethomas: La Vénitienne (1904). Salon d’Automne, 1904, n°1421. Palais des Beaux-Arts, Lille.

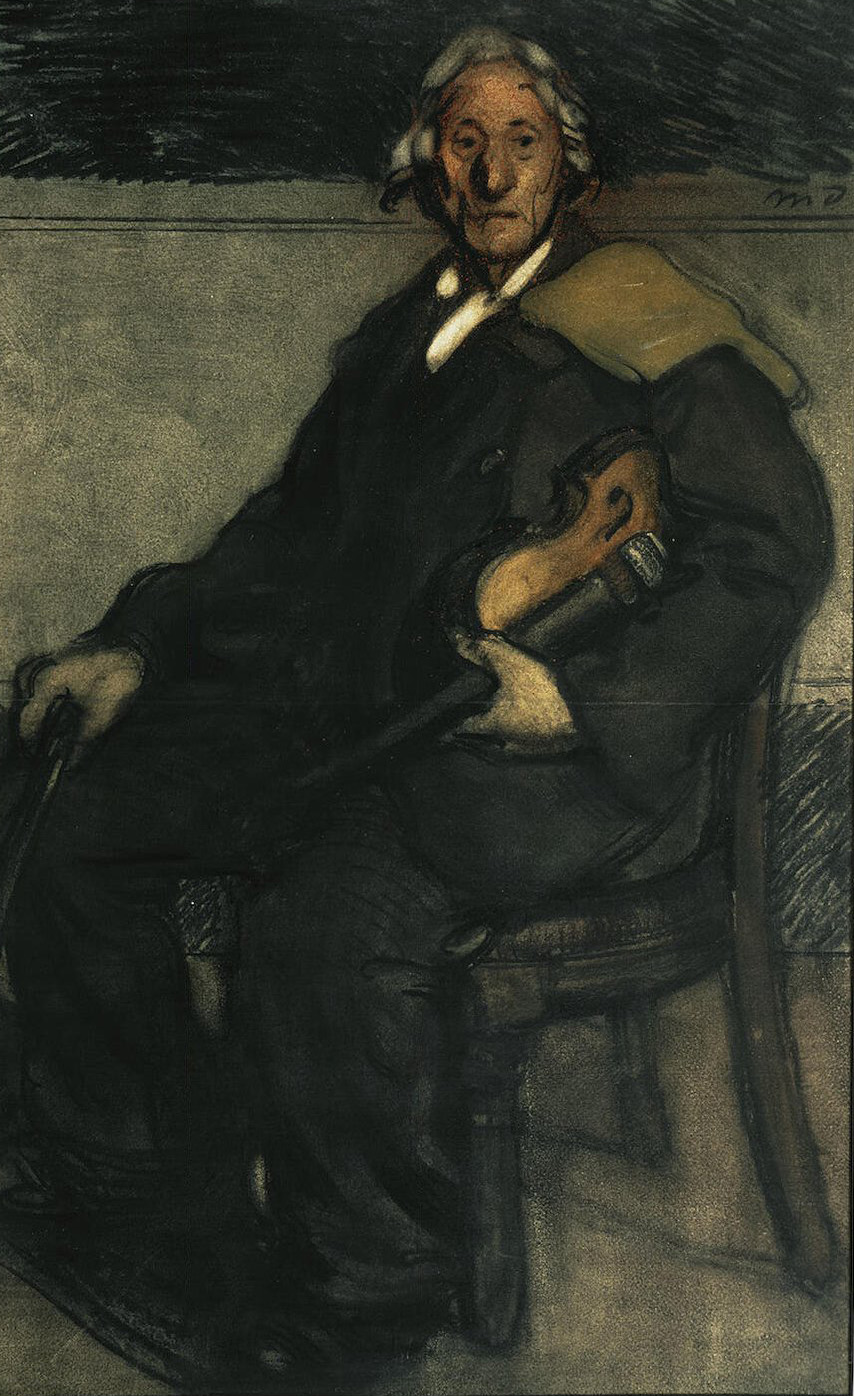
Maxime Dethomas: Le second violin (1904). Salon d’Automne, 1904, n°1424. Hermitage Museum, St. Petersburg.

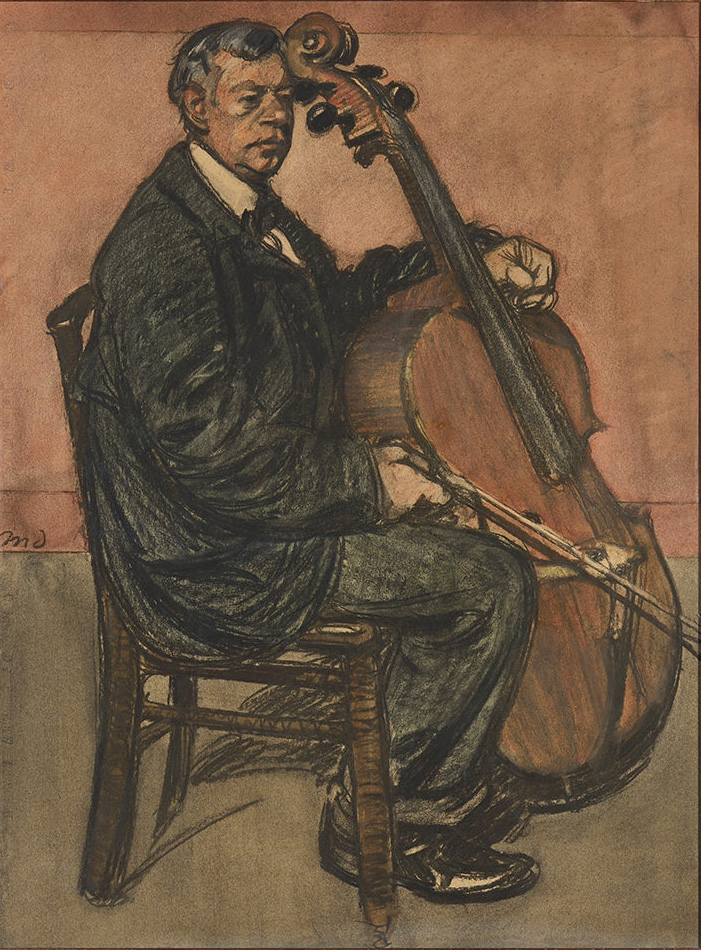
Maxime Dethomas: Le violoncelliste (1904). Salon d’Automne, 1904, n°1425.

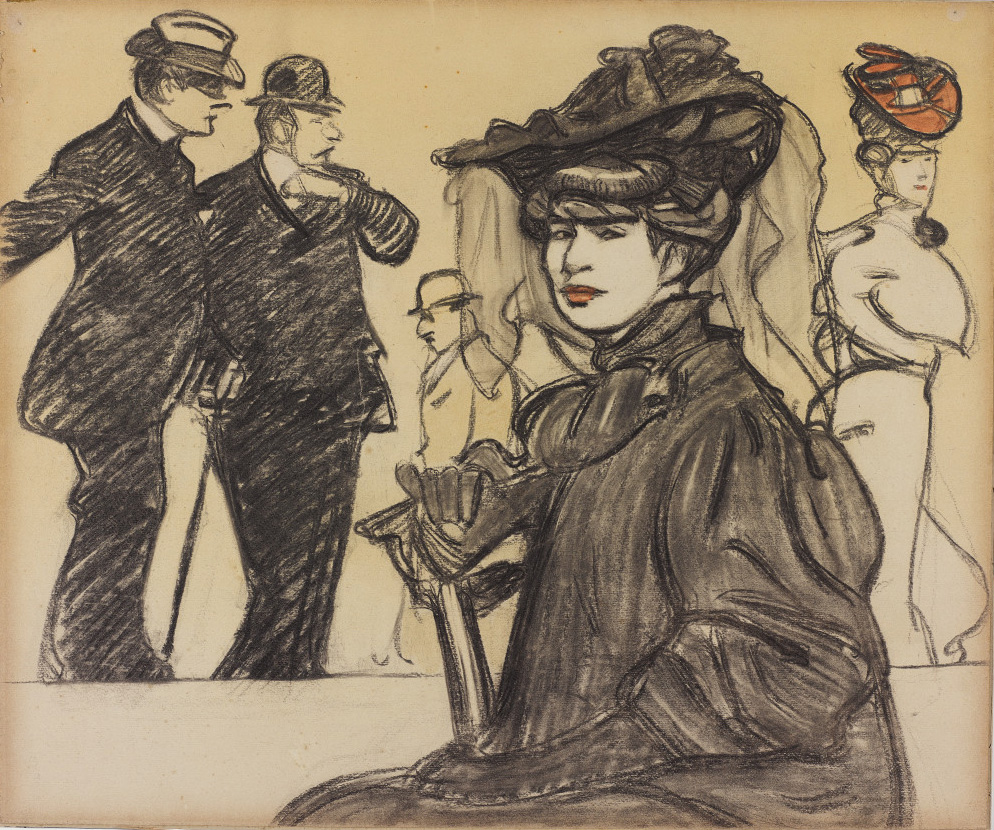
Maxime Dethomas: Cliente au Café du Rat Mort (c. 1905). Art Gallery of Ontario.

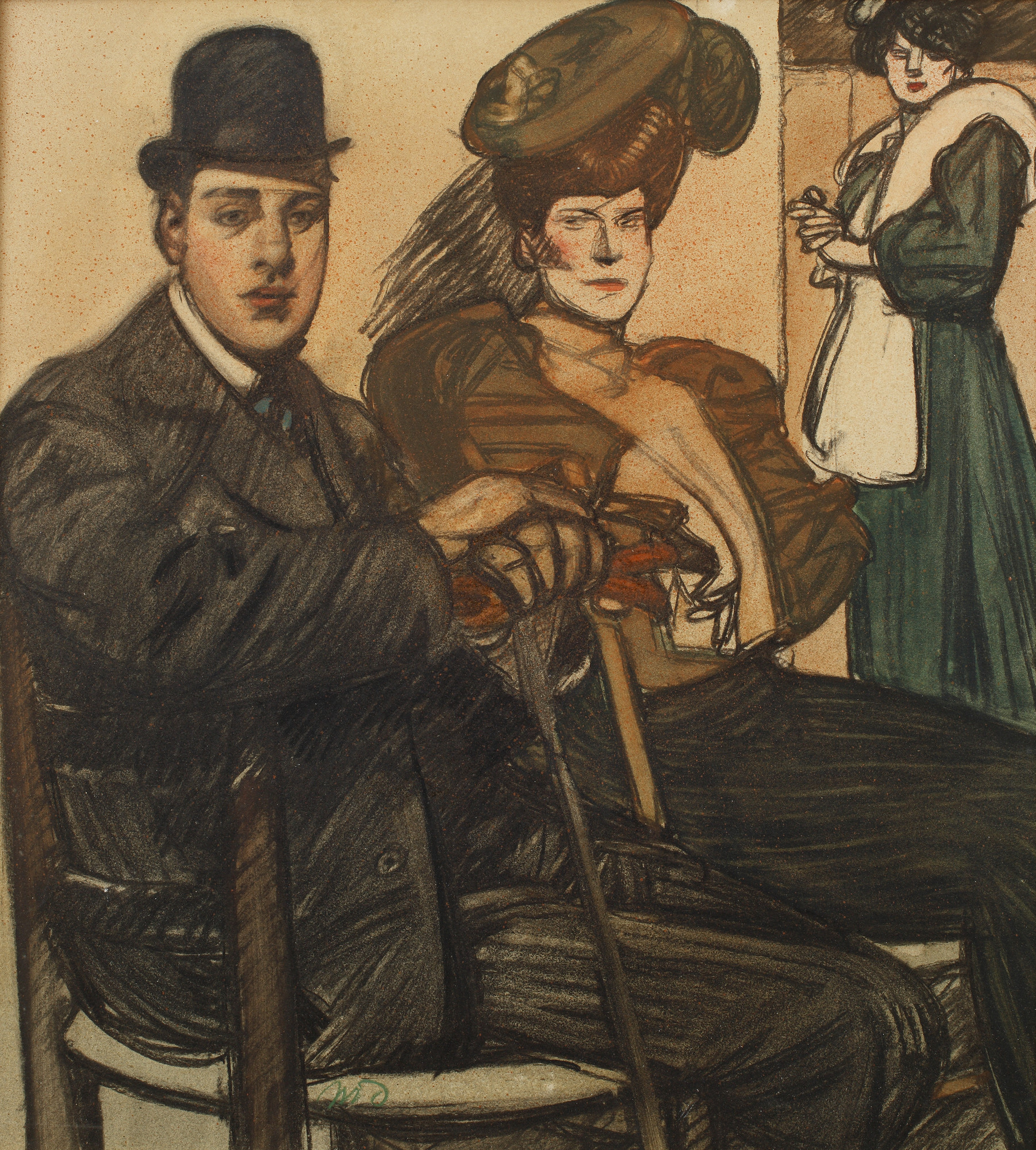
Maxime Dethomas: Au café (c. 1905). H.D. Schimmel Collection.

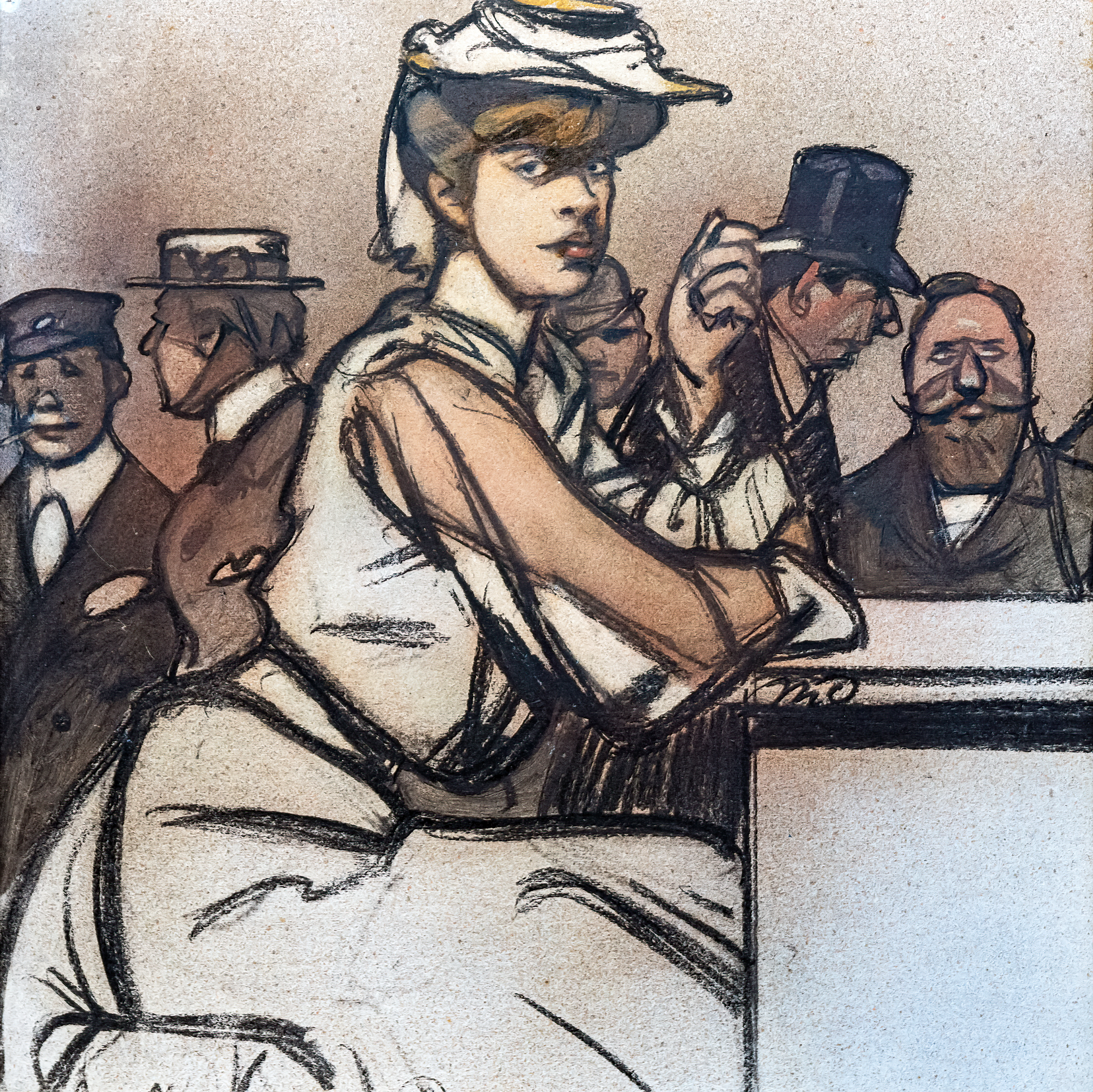
Maxime Dethomas: Elégant en robe blanche à la cigarette (c. 1910). Musée Toulouse-Lautrec

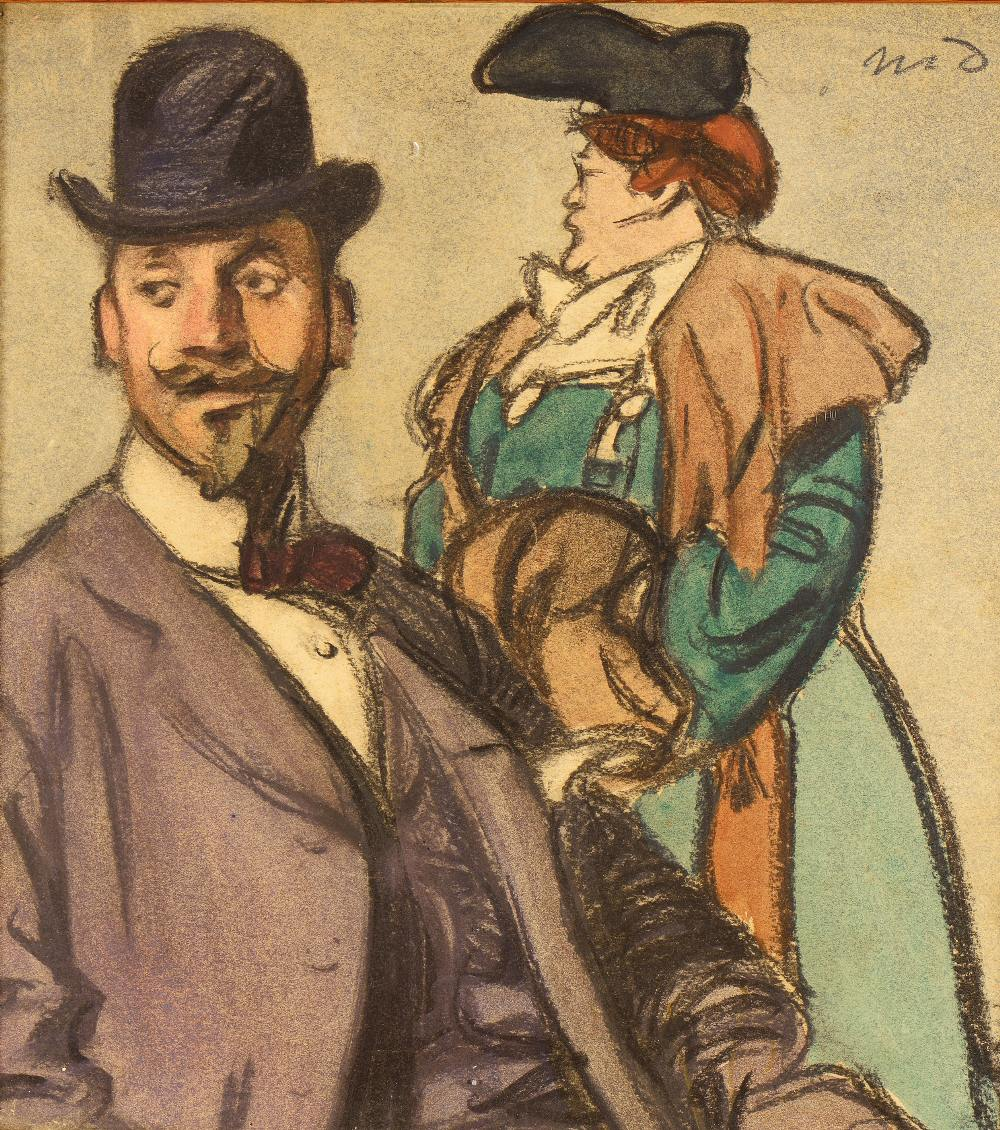
Maxime Dethomas: Homme au melon et femme à la manchette - Le Regard (c. 1905).

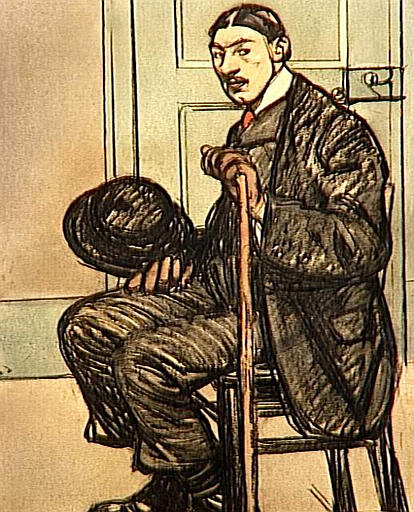
Maxime Dethomas: Le Solliciteur (Before Aug., 1905). Musée d'Orsay, Paris.

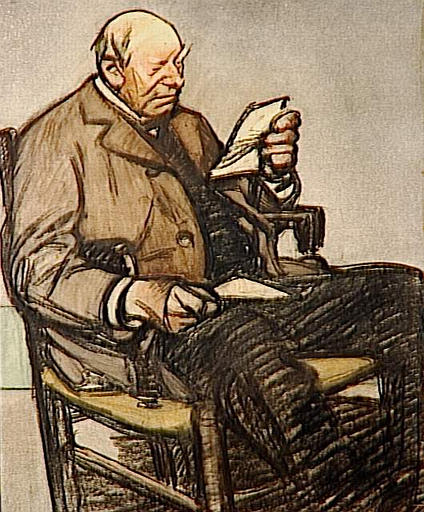
Maxime Dethomas: Le Sollicité (Before Aug., 1905). Musée d'Orsay, Paris.

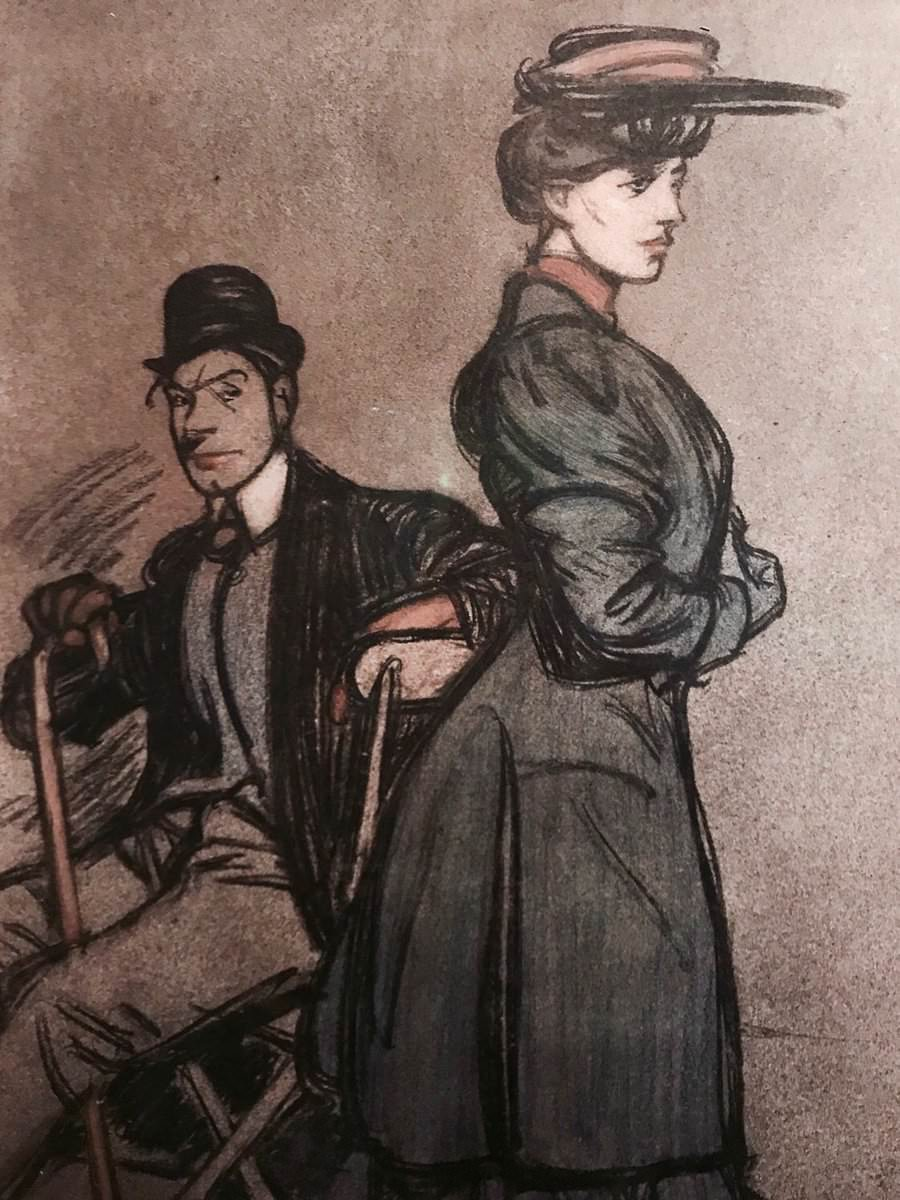
Maxime Dethomas: Et modeste (c. 1905). Musée de Montmartre, Paris.

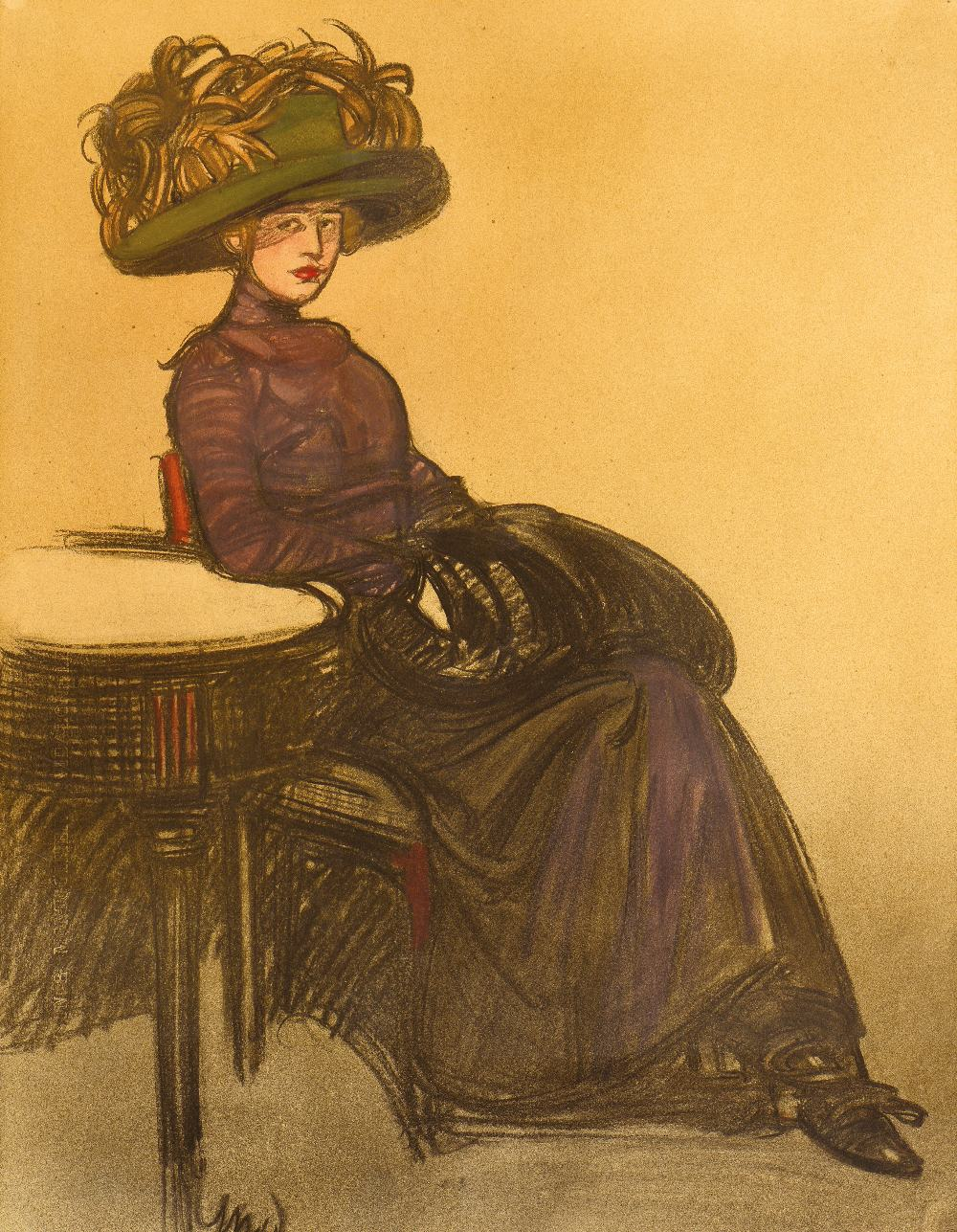
Maxime Dethomas: Femme assise au manchon et chapeau à plumes (c. 1905).

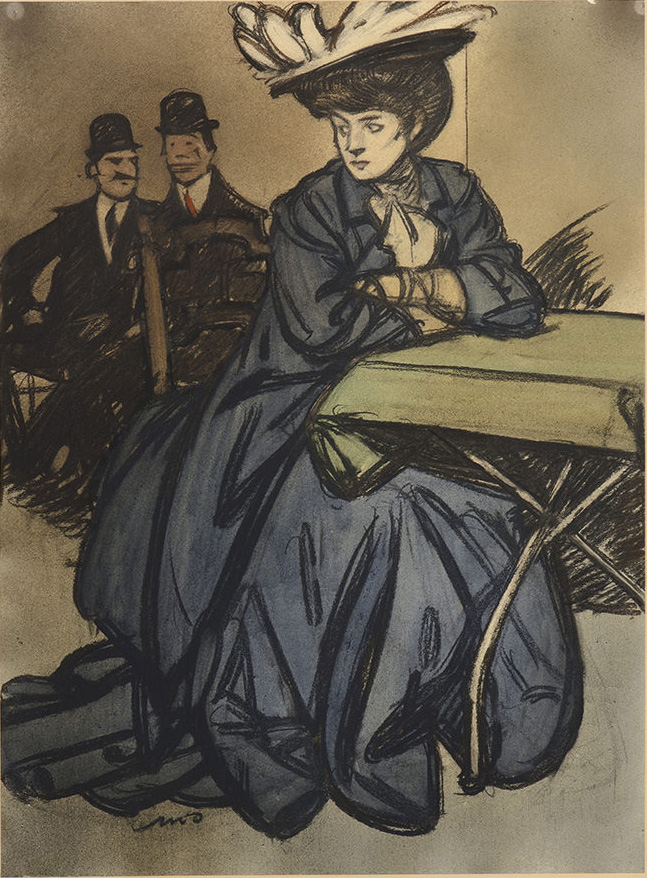
Maxime Dethomas: Sous l’oeil des Barbares (1907). Salon d’Automne, 1907, n°459.

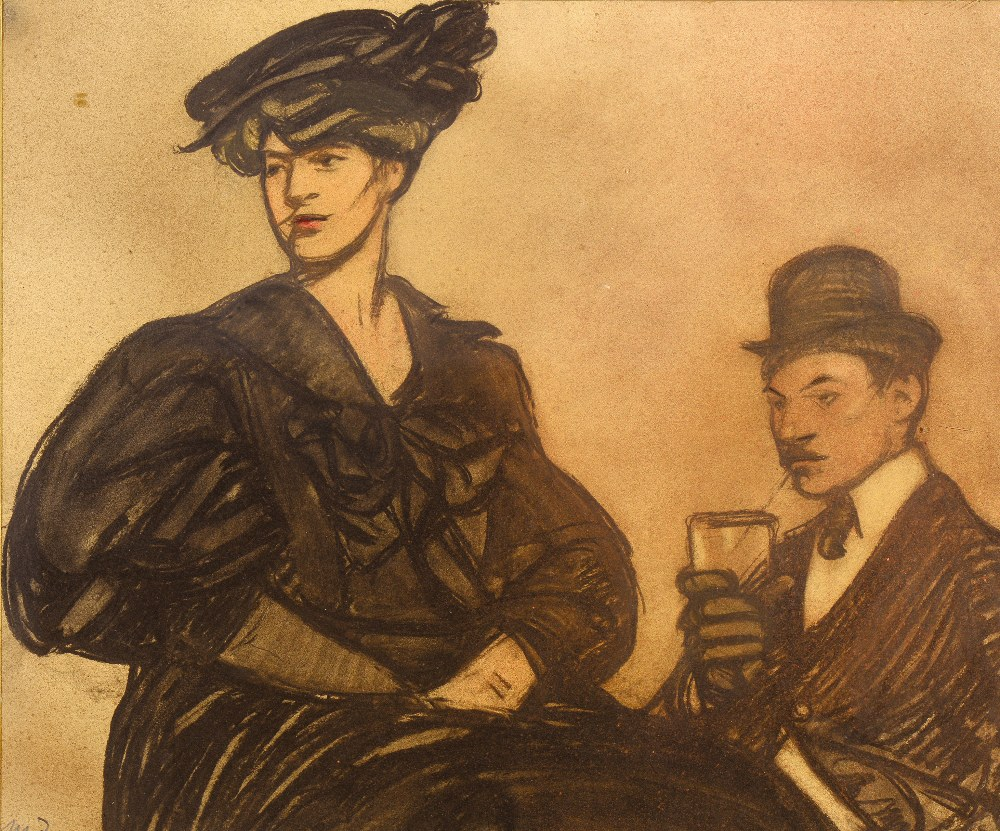
Maxime Dethomas: L'Indifférente (1907).Salon d’Automne, 1907, n°460.

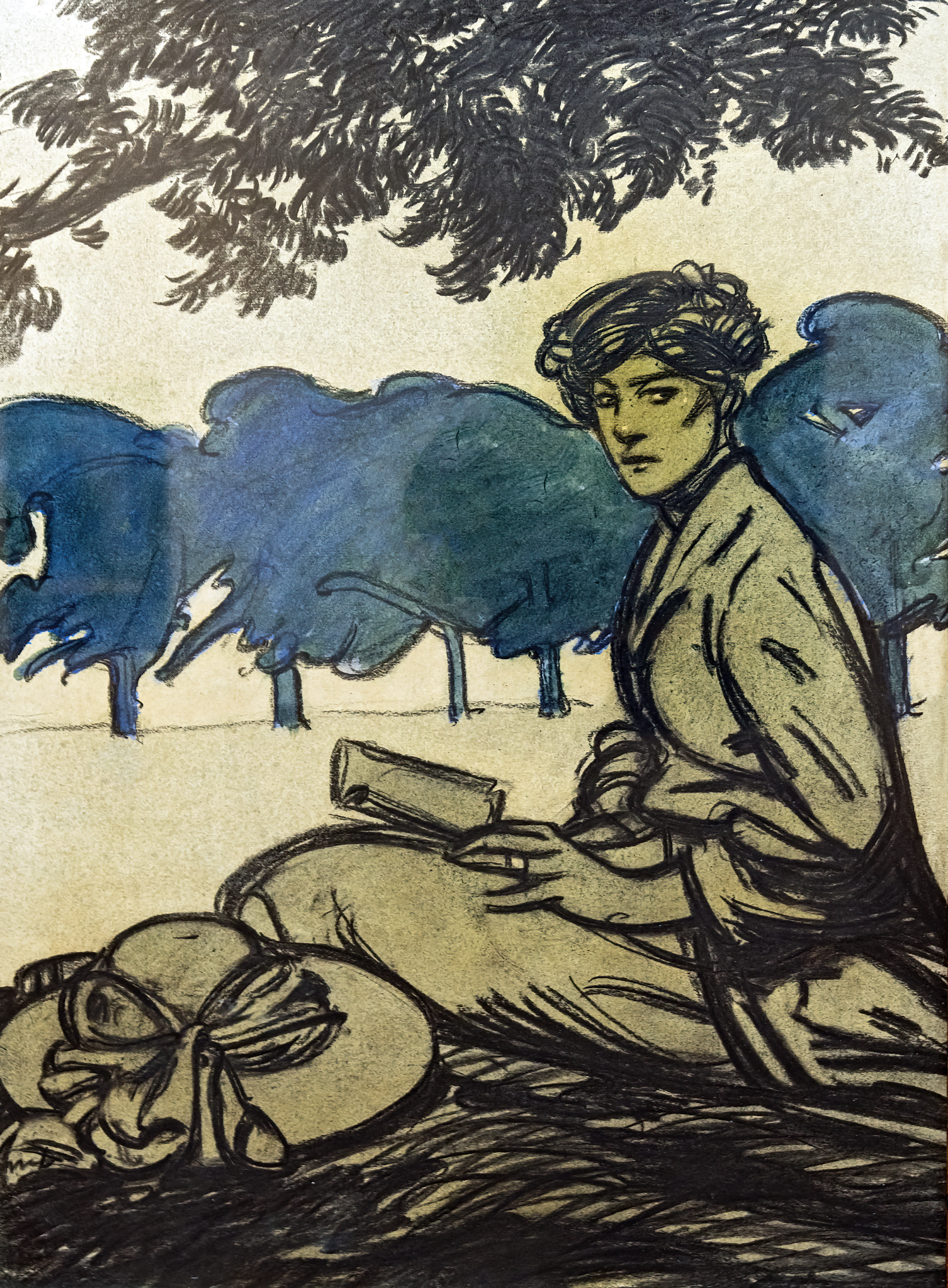
Maxime Dethomas: Femme Assise dans un parc (1910) Musée Toulouse-Lautrec.

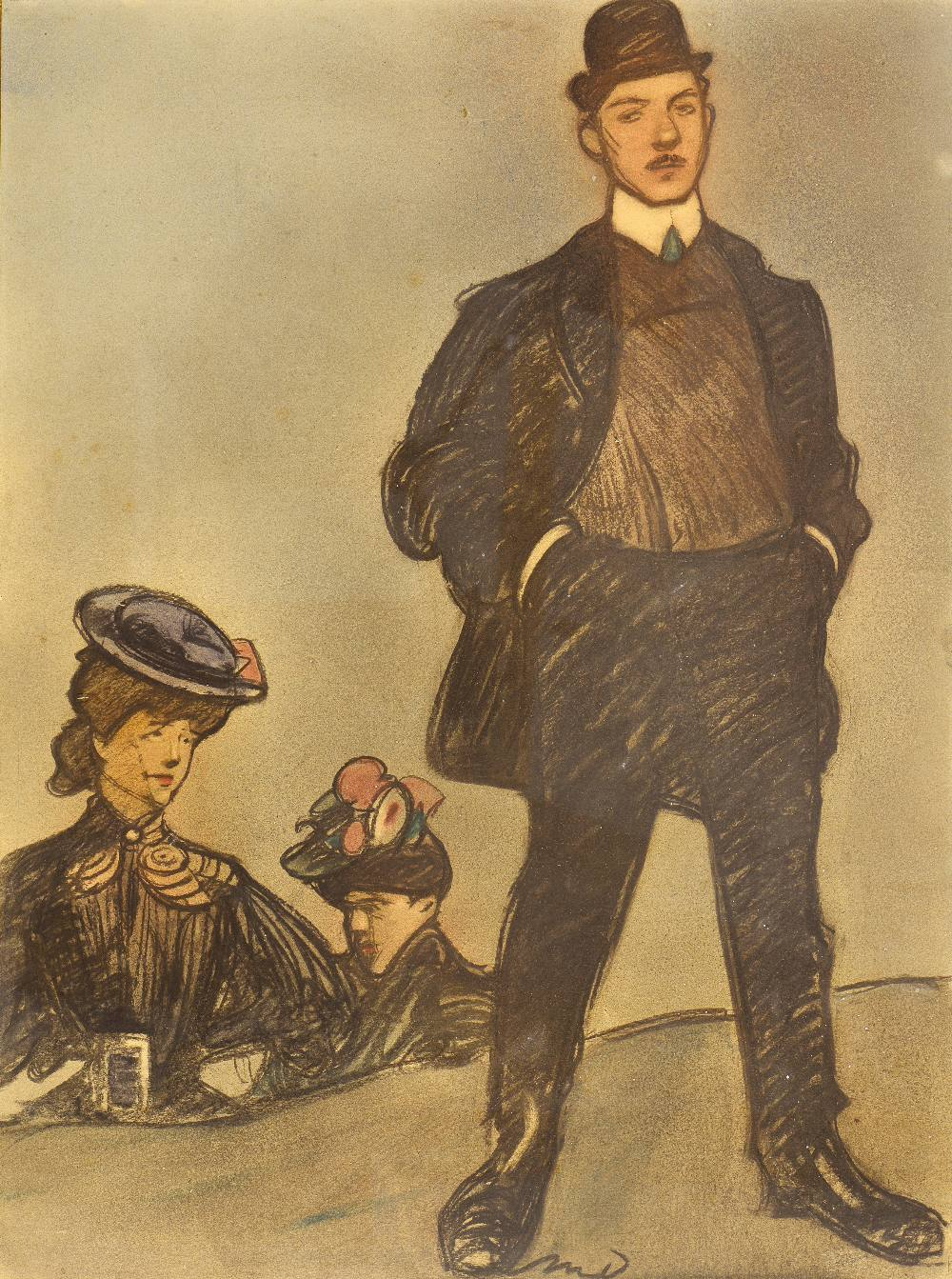
Maxime Dethomas: Acteur sur scène devant deux femmes (c. 1907).

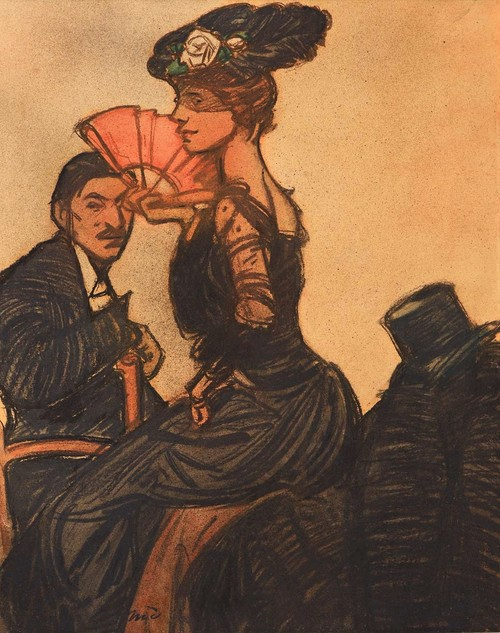
Maxime Dethomas: Elégante à l’éventail (c. 1907).

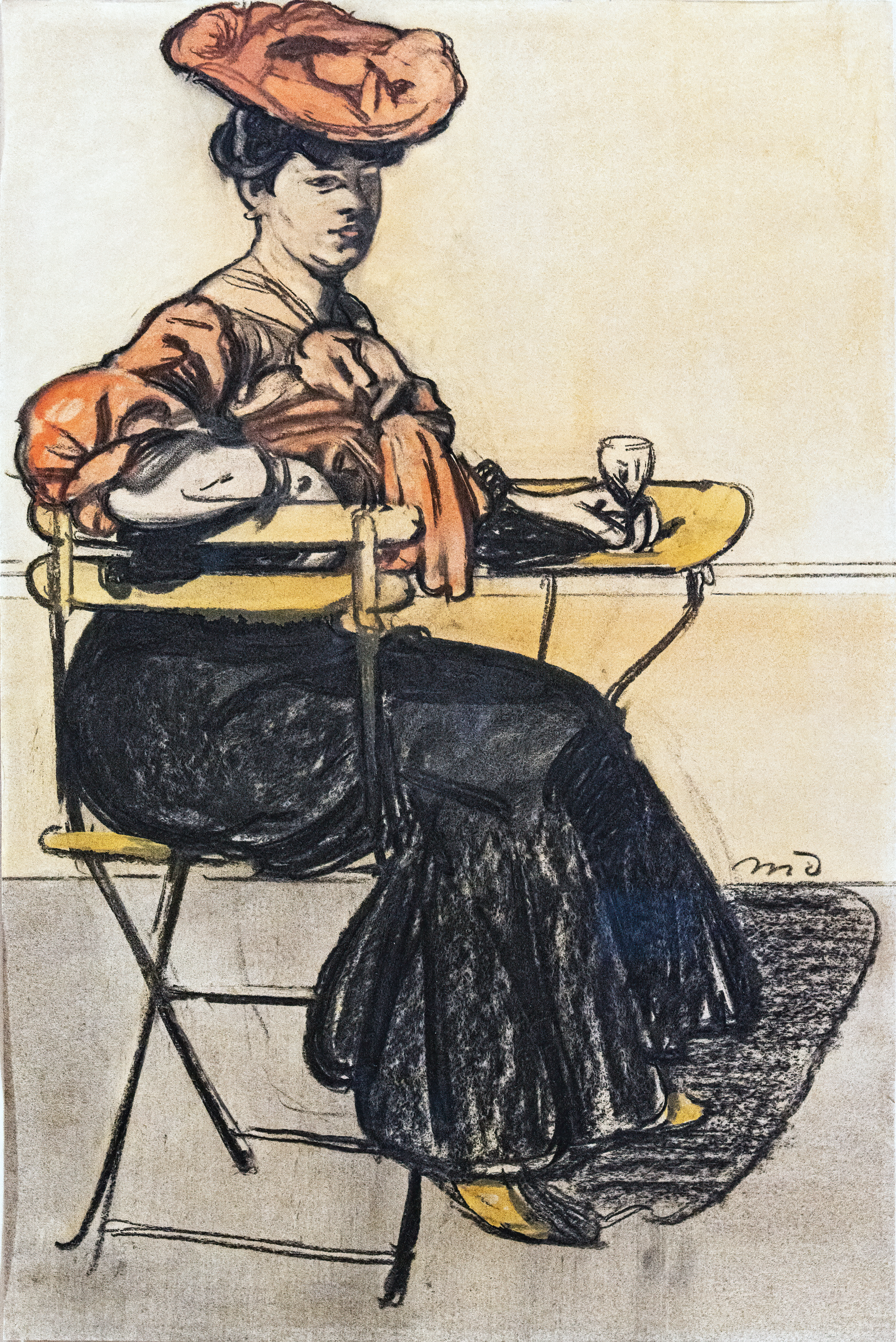
Femme attablée au café (c. 1908).

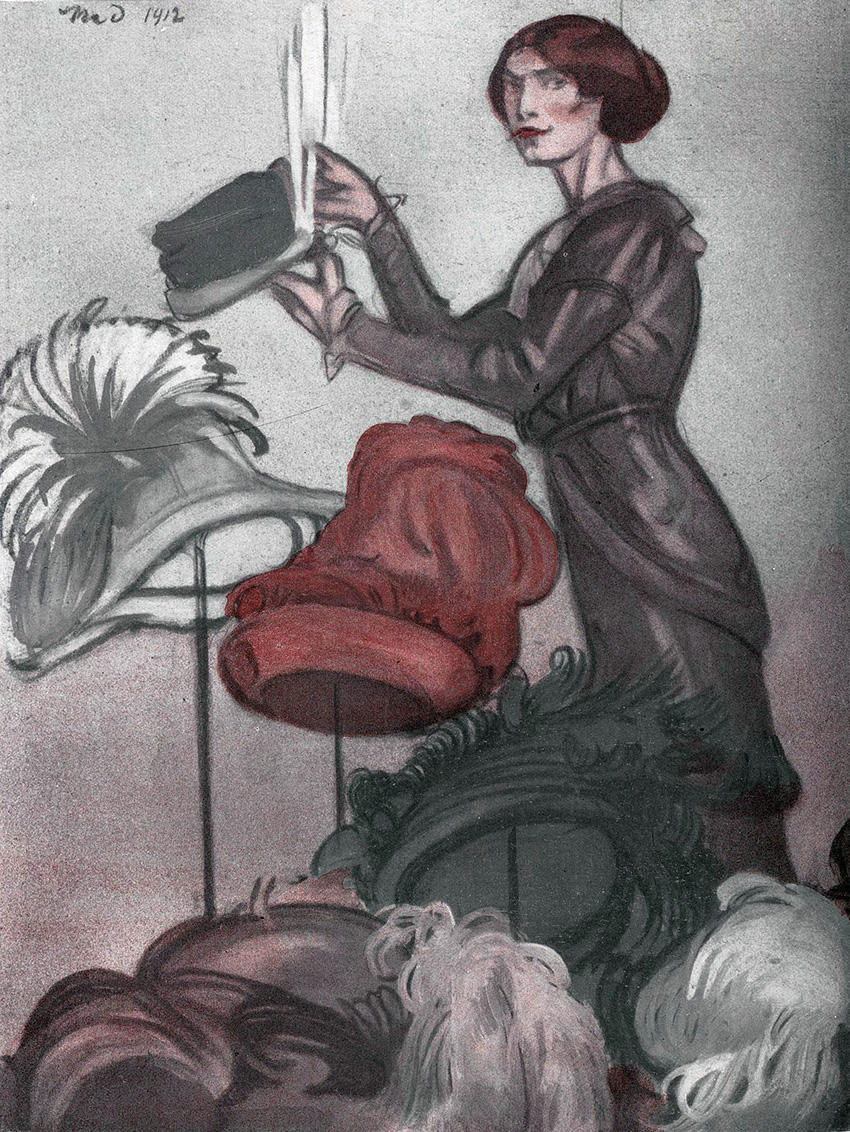
Maxime Dethomas: La Femme Ideale (1912).

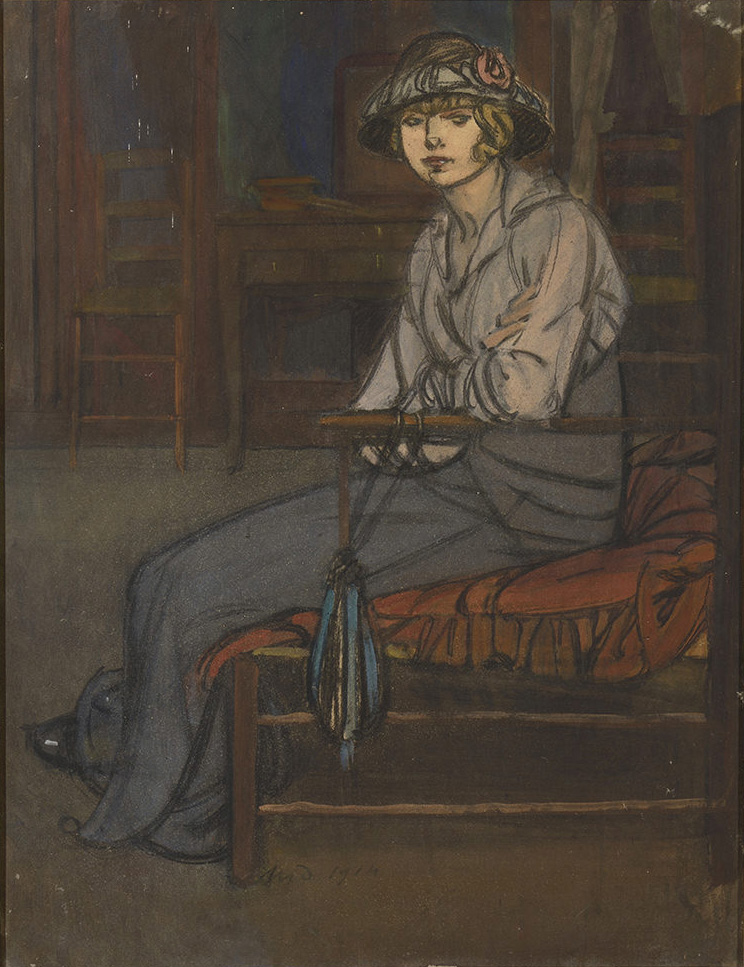
Maxime Dethomas: Parisienne assise (1914).

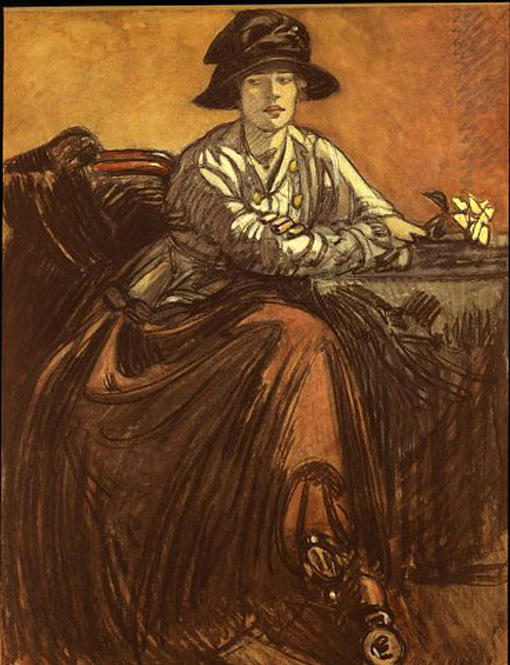
Maxime Dethomas: Une Femme Assise (1917).

== Theatre ==
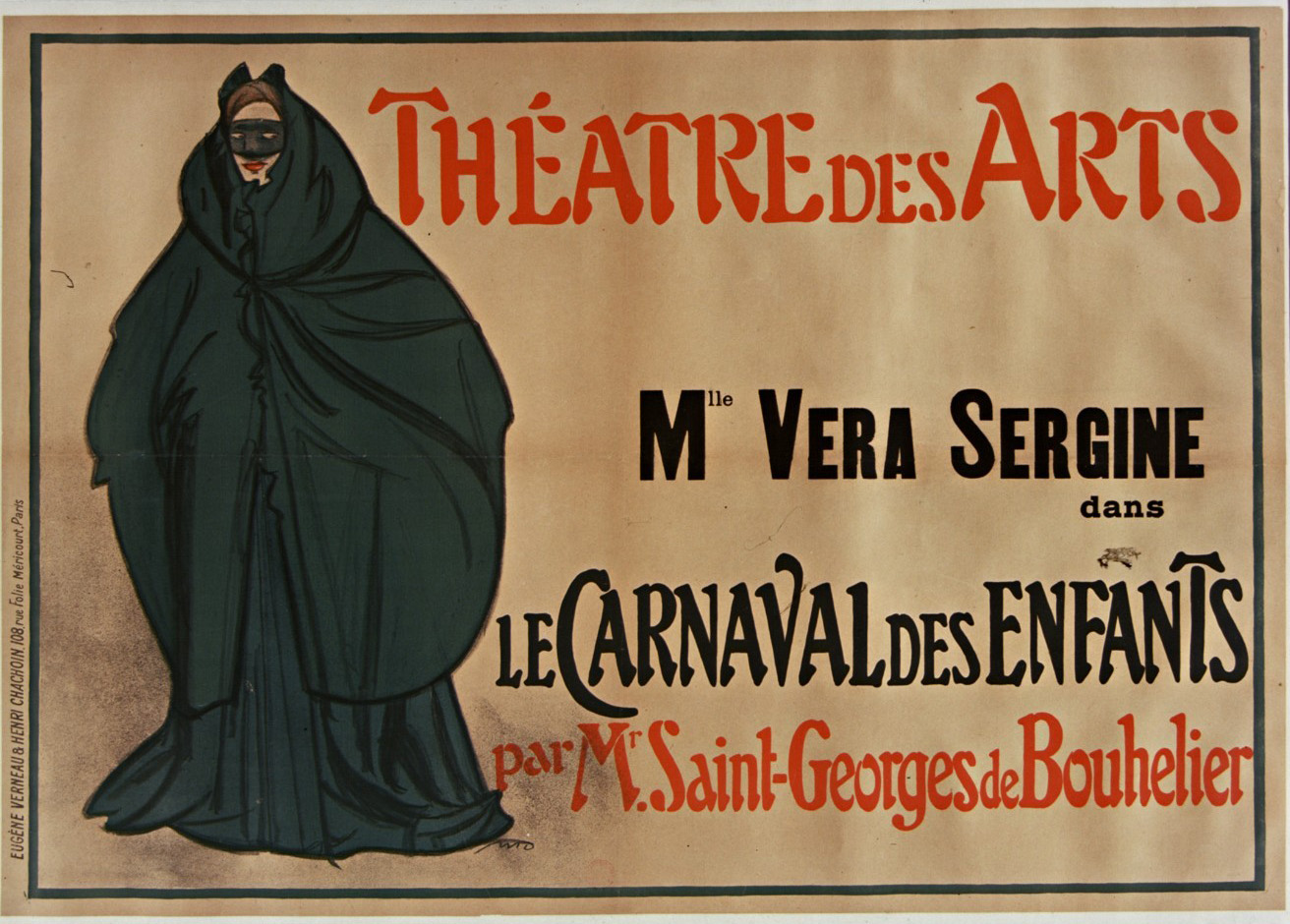
Théatre des Arts poster for Le Carnaval des Enfants, created by Maxime Dethomas. Premiered November 25th, 1910. Dethomas was also responsible for set and costume design.

From 1910 to 1913, Dethomas worked under Jacques Rouché during his tenure at the Théâtre des Arts. Upon assuming management of the theater, Rouché enlisted the talents of several artists who had contributed to his magazine, La Grande Revue, including Jacques Dresa, René Piot and Maxime Dethomas, none of which had previously worked for the stage.

As director of the services plastiques, Dethomas embarked on a career that would last for the remainder of his life. The Théâtre des Arts represented a major shift away from facile acting, shallow content and the painted-canvas drawing rooms of commercial theater that were the norm. The inaugural production, Le Carnaval des Enfants (1910), marked a major theatrical revolution by which Dethomas' settings accentuated line and colour, rather than a focus on painted detail and endless props. Against blue, ochre, grey and steel, black costumed characters created striking pictorial compositions in lighting effects that "varied like inflections in a conversation".

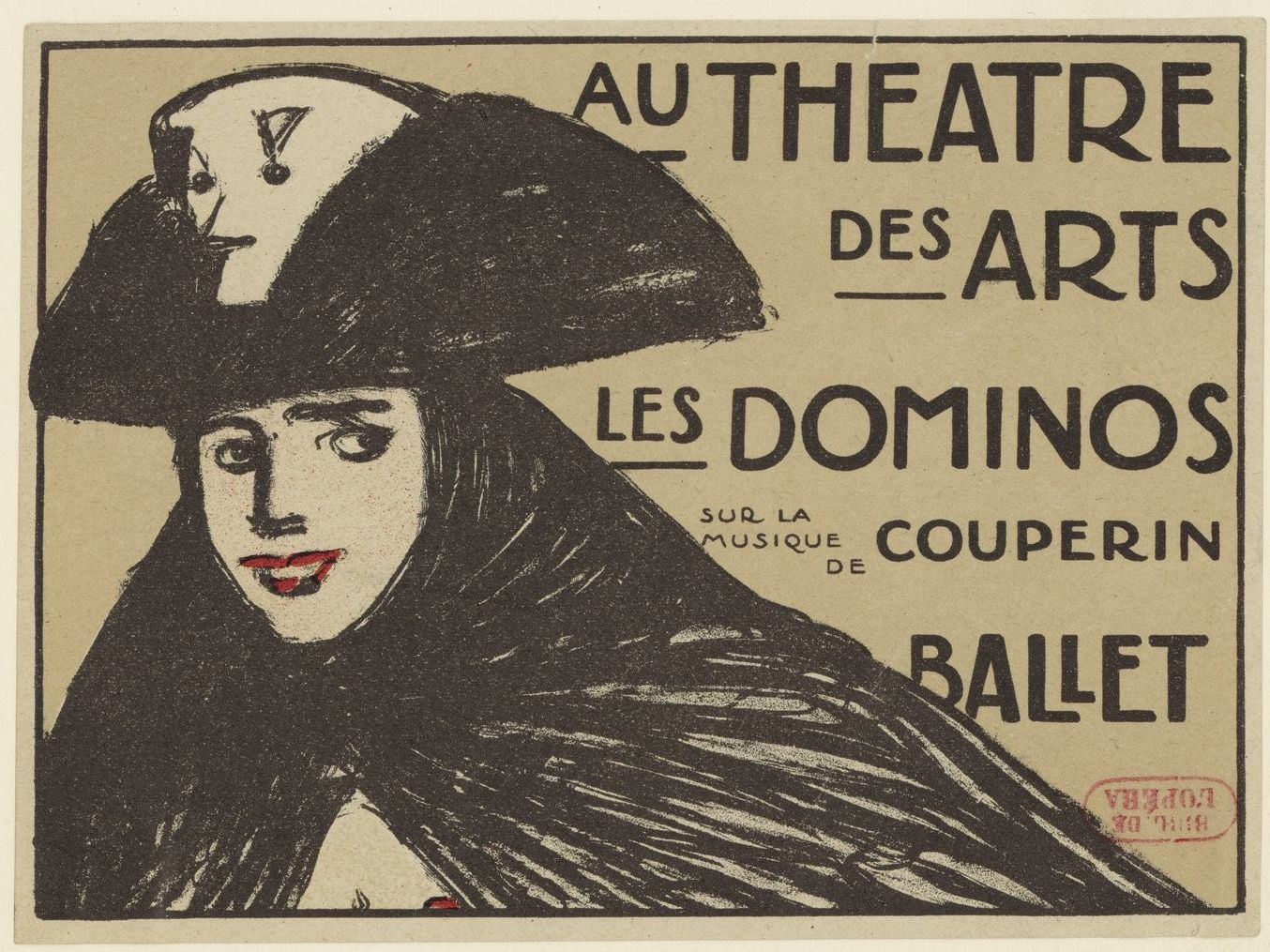
Théâtre des Arts poster for Les dominos sur la musique de Couperin (1911). In addition to this poster, Dethomas also created sets, costumes and a programme.

The Théâtre des Arts went on to present nearly twenty plays, including Jacques Copeau's adaptation of The Brothers Karamazov (1911), and the stage production of La Tragédie de Salomé (1912), both a popular and critical success. Dethomas' reputation as a set and costume designer was such that by early 1912, he was commissioned by the British aristocracy to design a set and costumes for a London masked ball with some two thousand guests.

Hired to direct and decorate at the Paris Opera in 1914, Rouché and Dethomas went on to offer fresh interpretation of old material and to make inroads into stale scenic convention. By 1917, Dethomas was also designing sets and costumes for the Comédie Française; the Théâtre Sarah-Bernhardt in 1919; the Théâtre Femina and Le Trianon in 1920; and the Opéra-Comique in 1926 as it celebrated Manuel de Falla's 50th birthday. With a program consisting of La Vida Breve, El Amor Brujo, and Master Peter's Puppet Show, Falla's close friend Ignacio Zuloaga and Dethomas collaborated to create sets and marionettes.

During his seventeen years in the theatre, Dethomas was artistic designer for over fifty plays, ballets and operas, featuring many of the era's most notable actors, dancers, singers, playwrights and composers, including Roussel, Stravinsky and Ravel. In his colour schemes Dethomas used visual analogy paired with the play-writer's thematic intent, "the progression of each scene following perfectly the progression of the drama". Dethomas once wrote that above all else decor should be a good servant of the play and that a designer must get beyond a "painterly feel" to something more solid. Guillaume Apollinaire declared that Dethomas' influence on French Theatre had "transformed the art of scenery, costume design and staging."

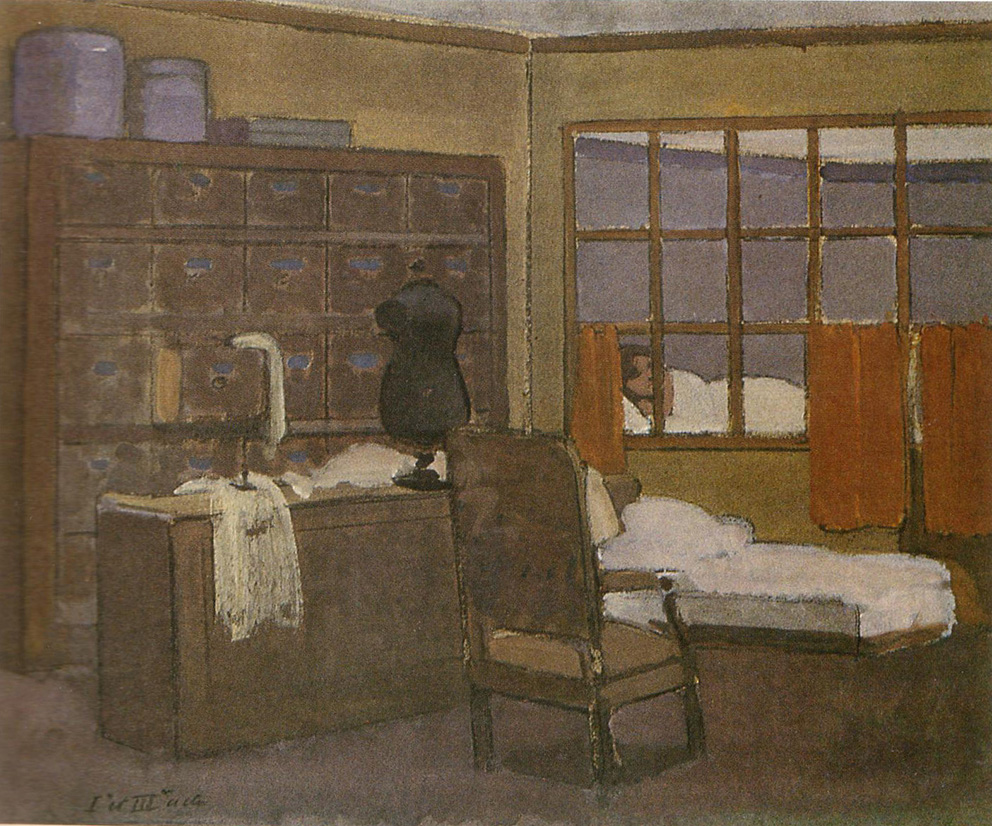
Set design for Act I and Act III of Carnaval des Enfants, 1910. Musée des Arts Décoratifs.

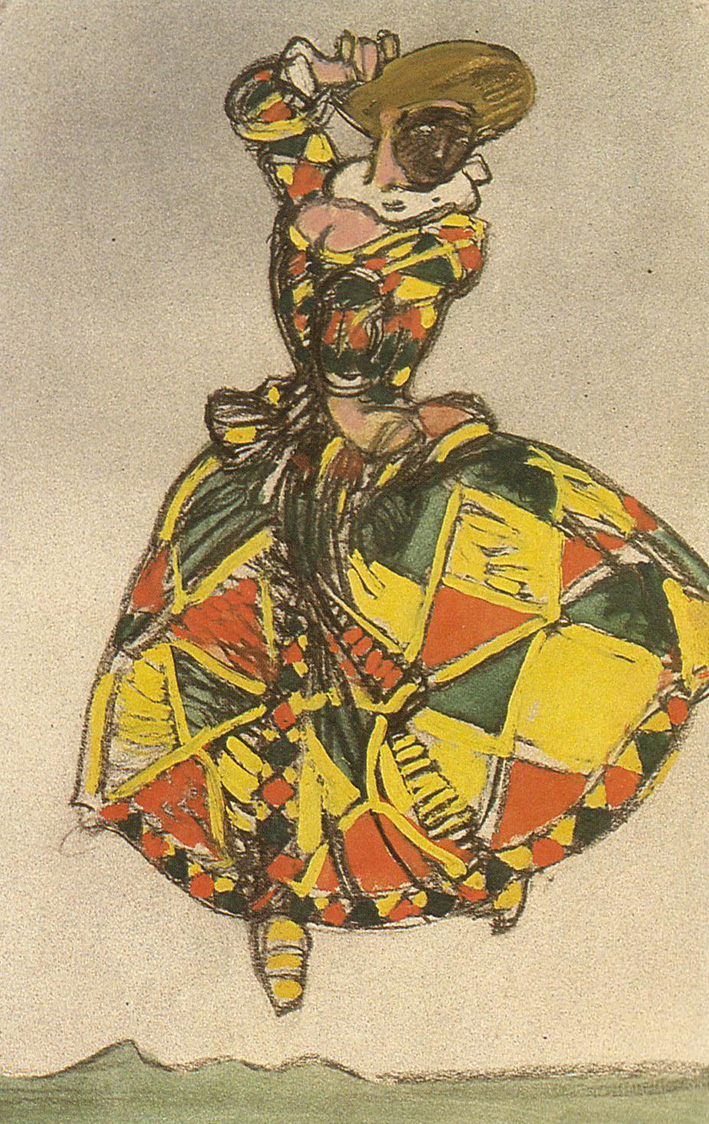
Costume design for Les dominos sur la musique de Couperin, 1911. Musée des Arts Décoratifs.

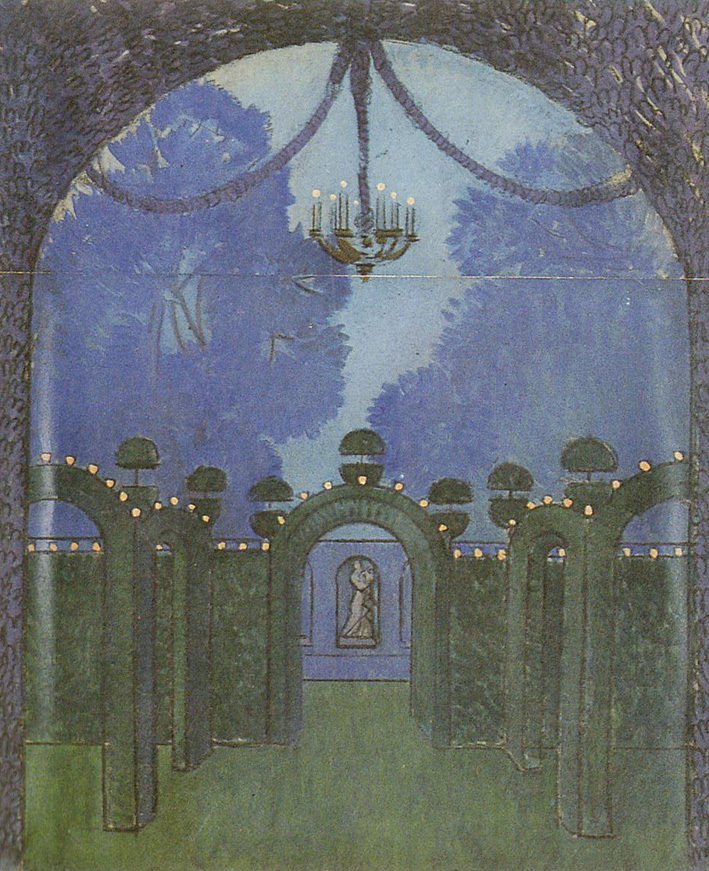
Set design for Prologue de Thésée, 1913. Musée des Arts Décoratifs.

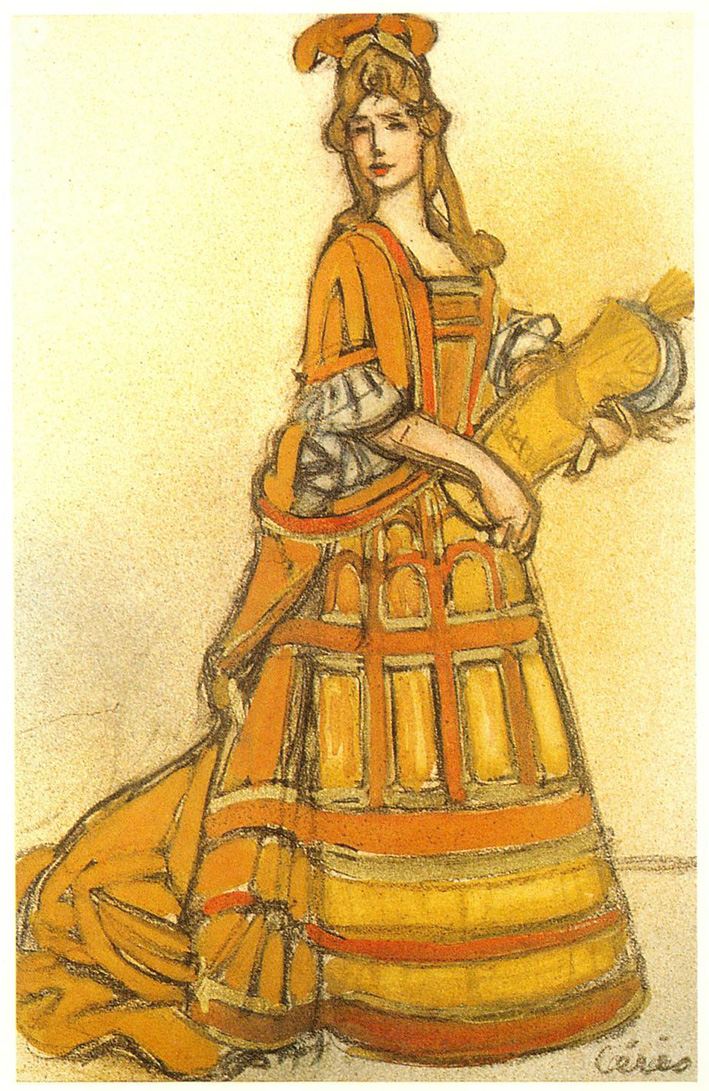
Costume design for Prologue de Thésée, 1913. Musée des Arts Décoratifs.

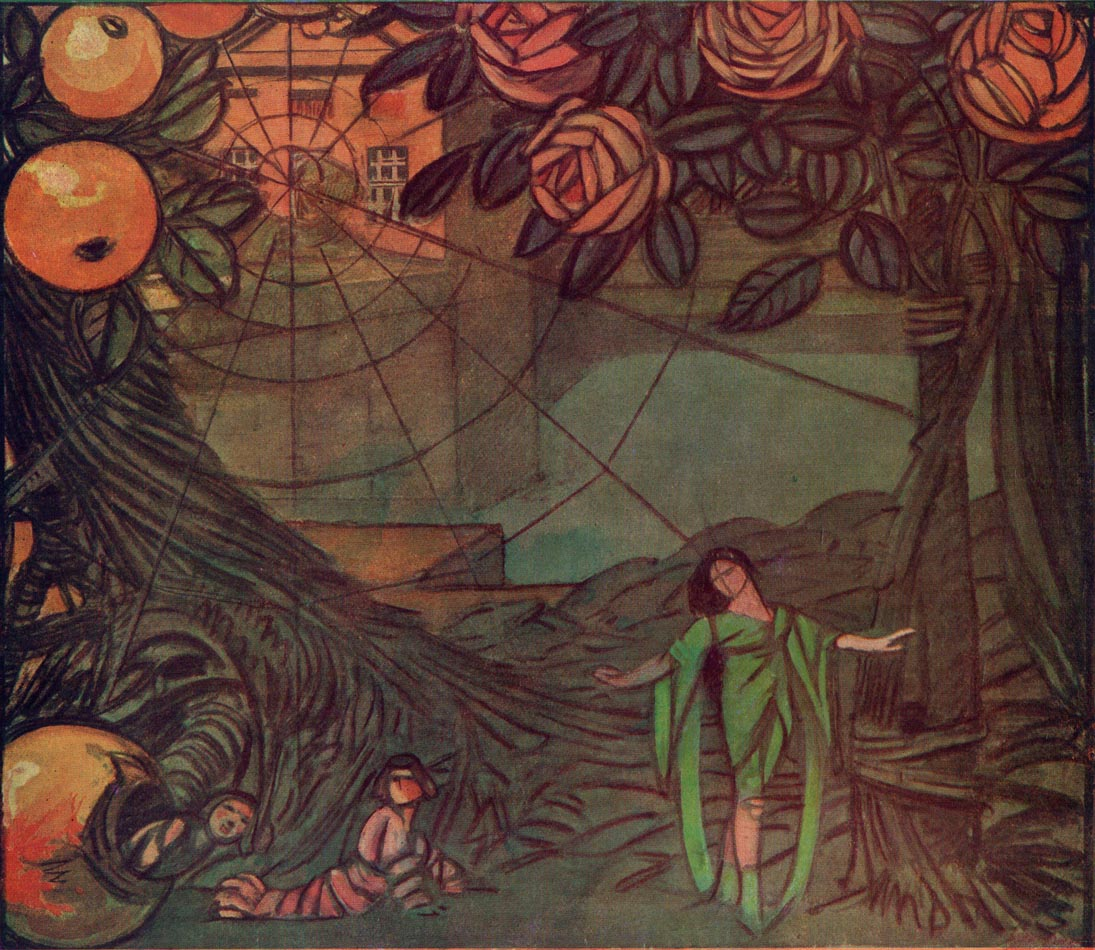
Set design for Roussel's Festin de l'Araingnee, 1913. Musée des Arts Décoratifs

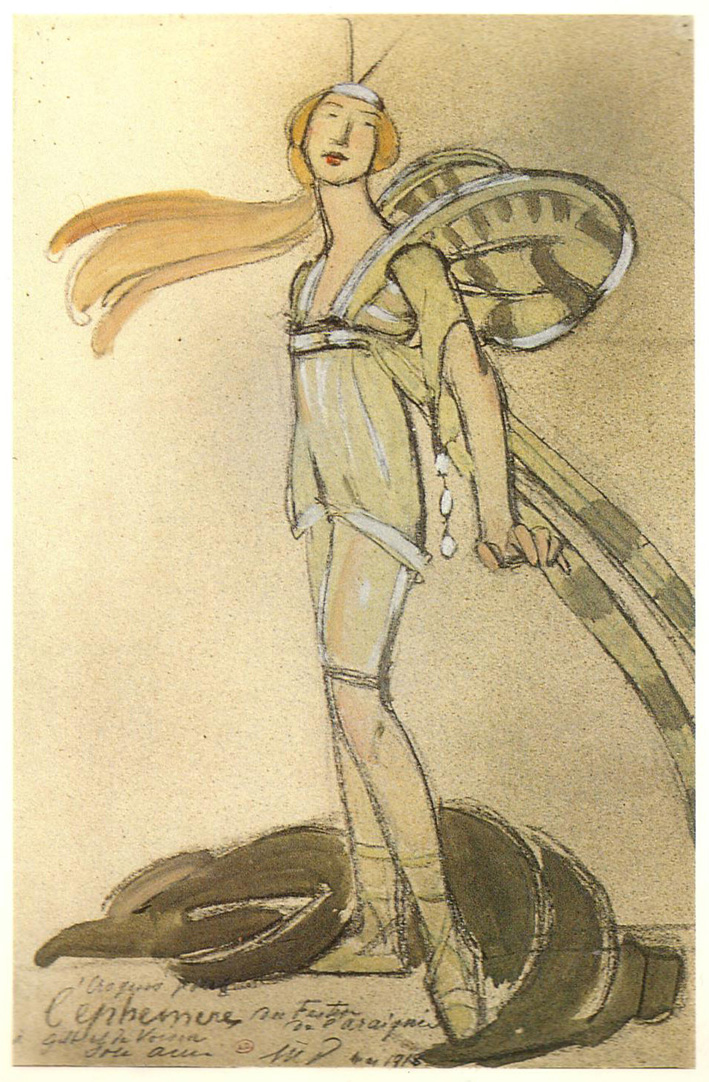
Costume design for Festin de l'Araignée, 1913. Musée des Arts Décoratifs.

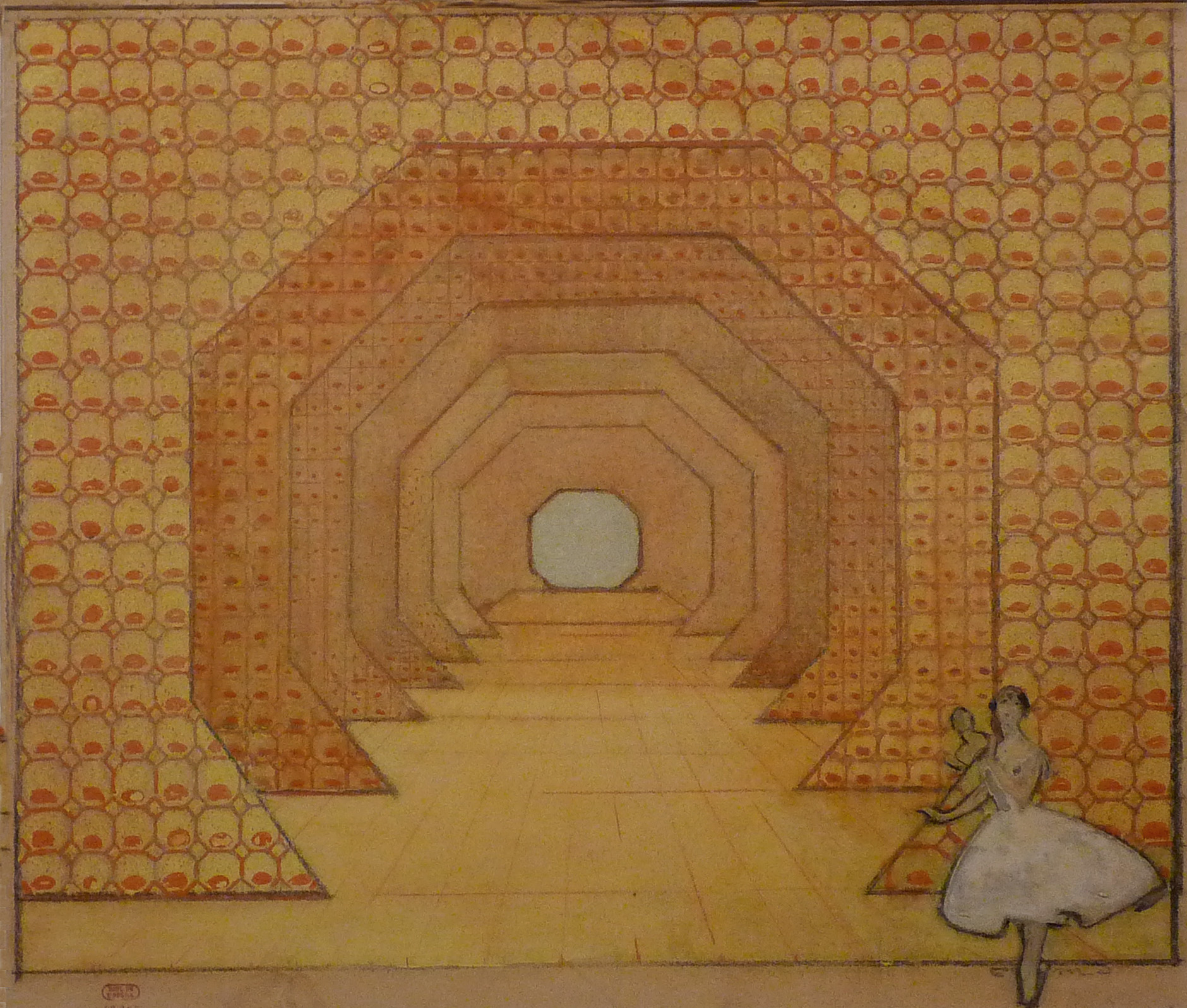
Set design for Les Abeilles, 1917. Musée des Arts Décoratifs.

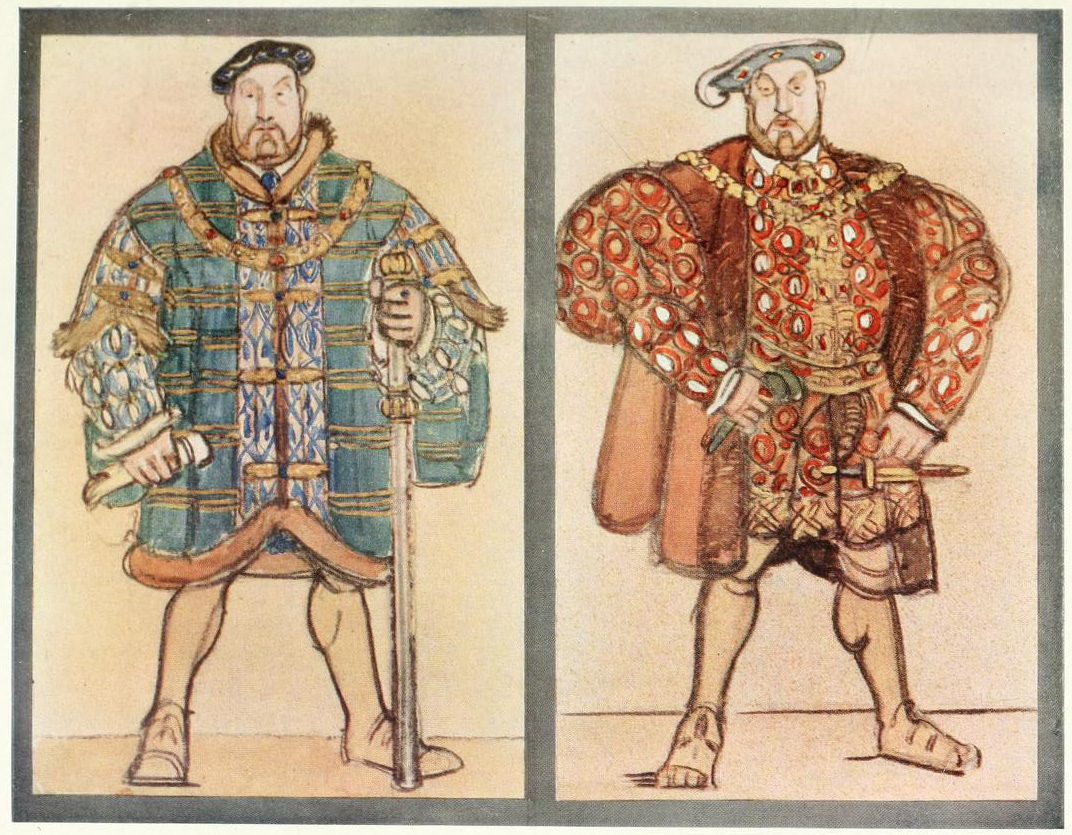
Costume design for Henry VIII, 1920.

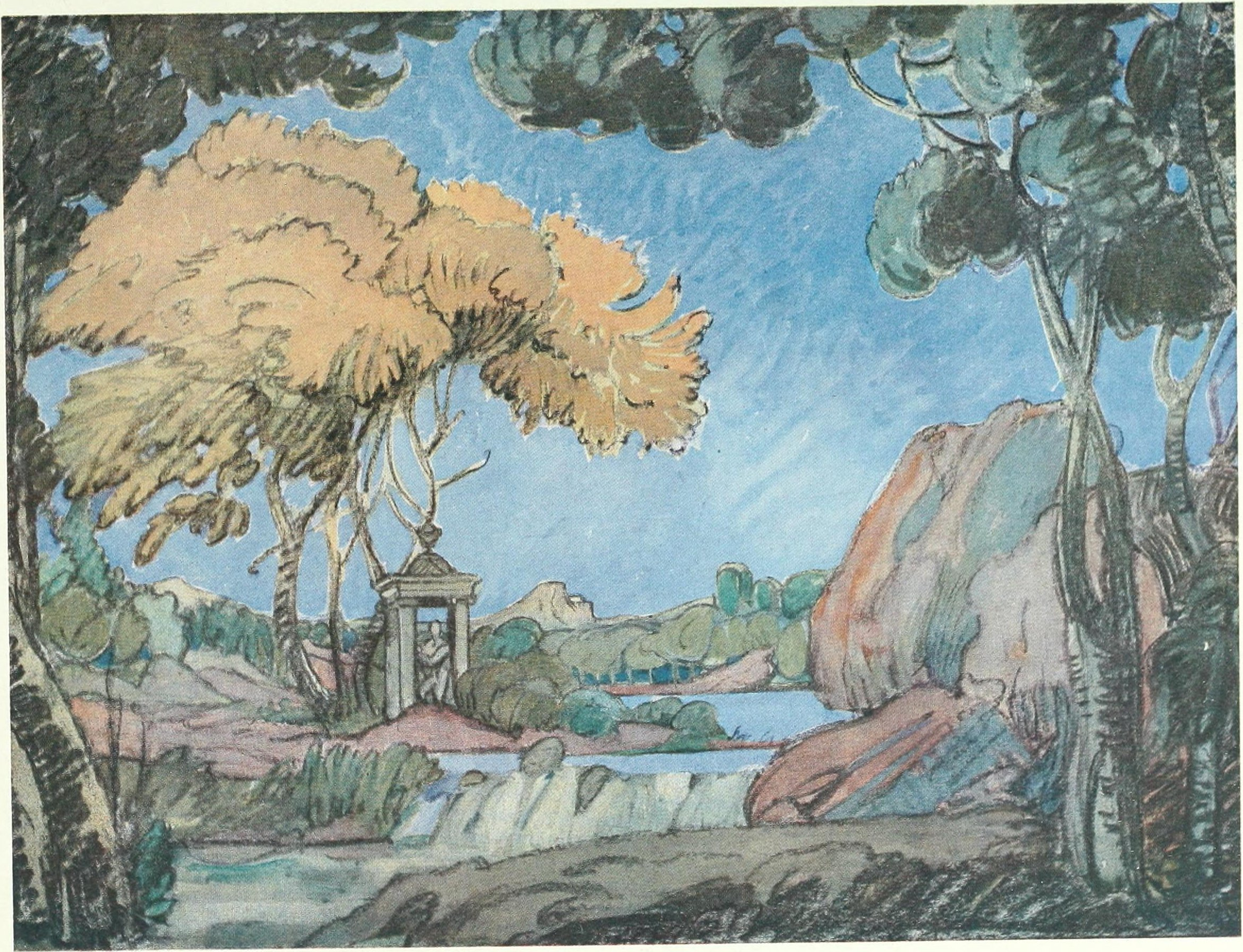
Set design for the first act of Sylvia, 1922.

== Associations ==
=== Henri de Toulouse-Lautrec ===
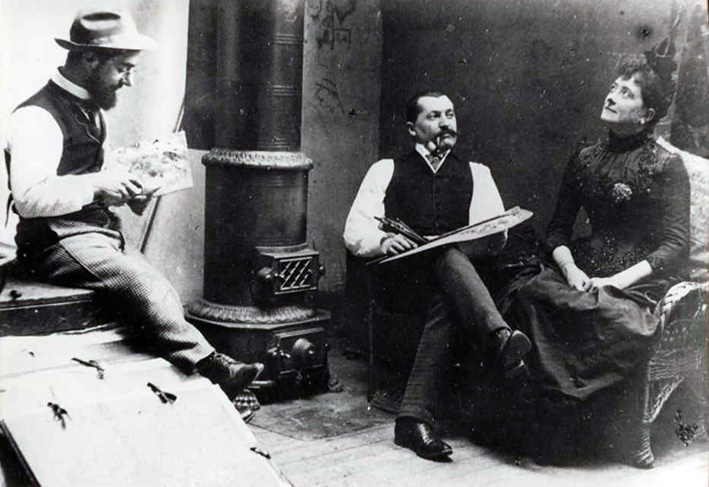
Henri de Toulouse-Lautrec (left) and Maxime Dethomas (centre) with unknown model in Lautrec's studio (c.1890)

During 1887 Dethomas began frequenting the library-bookshop of the Revue Indépendante, a favorite haunt of young artists and writers, in which he first befriended Louis Anquetin and Henri de Toulouse-Lautrec. Their friendship blossomed – so much so, that Dethomas would go on to become Toulouse-Lautrec's "favourite companion" and "closest friend".

Always drawn to physical eccentricity, Toulouse-Lautrec nicknamed the 6'6" Dethomas 'Gros n'abre' (roughly: Big Tree), for his imposing height and dead-pan face; Thadée Natanson described him as a gentle giant, polished and discreet – "He was so frightened of wearing anything that might draw attention to himself that even the black of his clothes seemed duller than that worn by others." Dethomas' placidity, corpulence and extreme shyness – he always blushed when he had to raise his voice – endeared him to Toulouse-Lautrec. Paul Leclercq claimed that Lautrec was fascinated by Dethomas' "ability to preserve an impassive appearance even in a place of amusement".

Whilst much has been made of the comical dynamic of their friendship, Toulouse-Lautrec also derived an element of utility from his companion. Calm and seemingly distant, Dethomas generally walked through life a discreet and unassuming character. However, when he accompanied Toulouse-Lautrec, their contrasting heights invariably attracted attention, the bowler hat of the little man barely reaching Maxime's elbow. Yet the jeers stopped at the quiet strength of Gros n'arbre. Contemporaries, like Gustave Coquiot, bear witness to this: "Lautrec loved Maxime Dethomas very much. This tall and strong fellow towered over him. With him, he felt under real protection. When together in the street, Lautrec never heard any ridicule. Dethomas, impassive and cold, always muzzled the crowd." Philippe Berthelot recalled that Toulouse-Lautrec playfully attributed his companion super-human strength and would loudly declare with mock seriousness that Dethomas "could have anyone's hide at his leisure!".

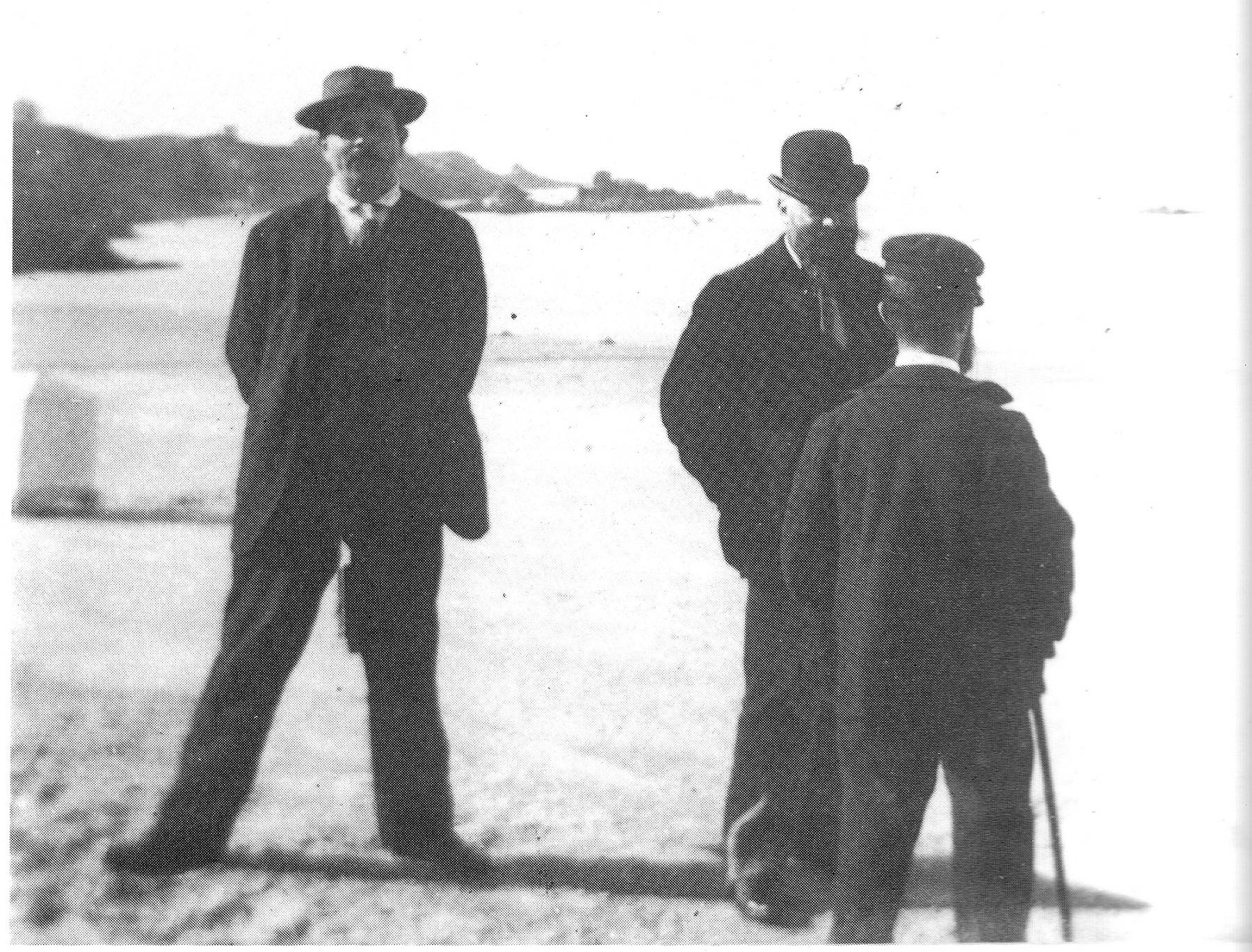
Maxime Dethomas, Thadée Natanson and H.T. Lautrec, Saint-Malo (1895-96)

In the first days of 1891, Dethomas moved to an apartment at 8, Cité Pigalle, Montmartre – selected no-less for its proximity to the workshop of Eugène Carrière, than to that of his friends Toulouse-Lautrec and the photographer Paul Sescau. They lived but streets apart, often visiting the cafes, cabarets, shady bars and brothels of Montmartre, including the Moulin rouge and Le Chat Noir, or extended stays at the notorious closed-houses, the Rue de' Amboise or the Rue Joubert. By 1894, Toulouse-Lautrec and Dethomas were exhibiting together at le Barc de Boutteville.

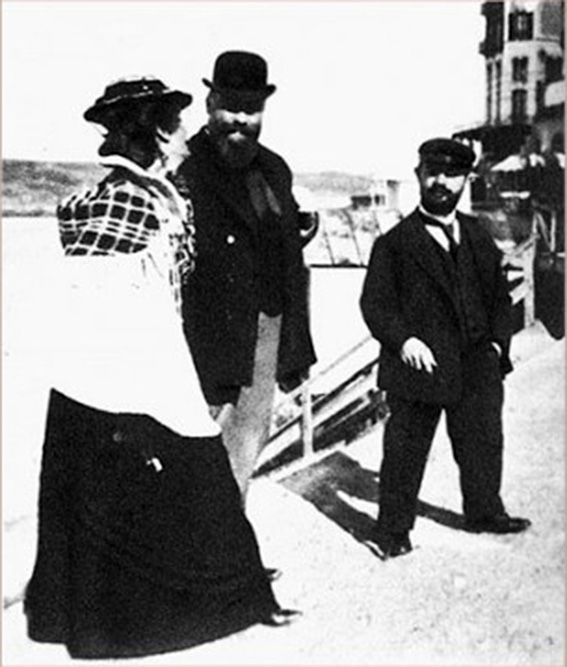
Misia Natanson, Thadée Natanson and H.T. Lautrec, Saint-Malo (1895-96)

On the 16th February, 1895, a party was held by the Natansons to celebrate the unveiling of new murals by Vuillard. Chosen from among his friends more for the comedic effect than for his bartending skill, Dethomas assisted Toulouse-Lautrec serving drinks, replete with absurd costumes and flourishes of theatrical drama. Together they served over two thousand cocktails to three hundred guests. The event was remembered as one of the most debaucherous evenings of the fin-de-siècle. Such escapades played an essential role in the development and themes of both Dethomas' and Toulouse-Lautrec's art.

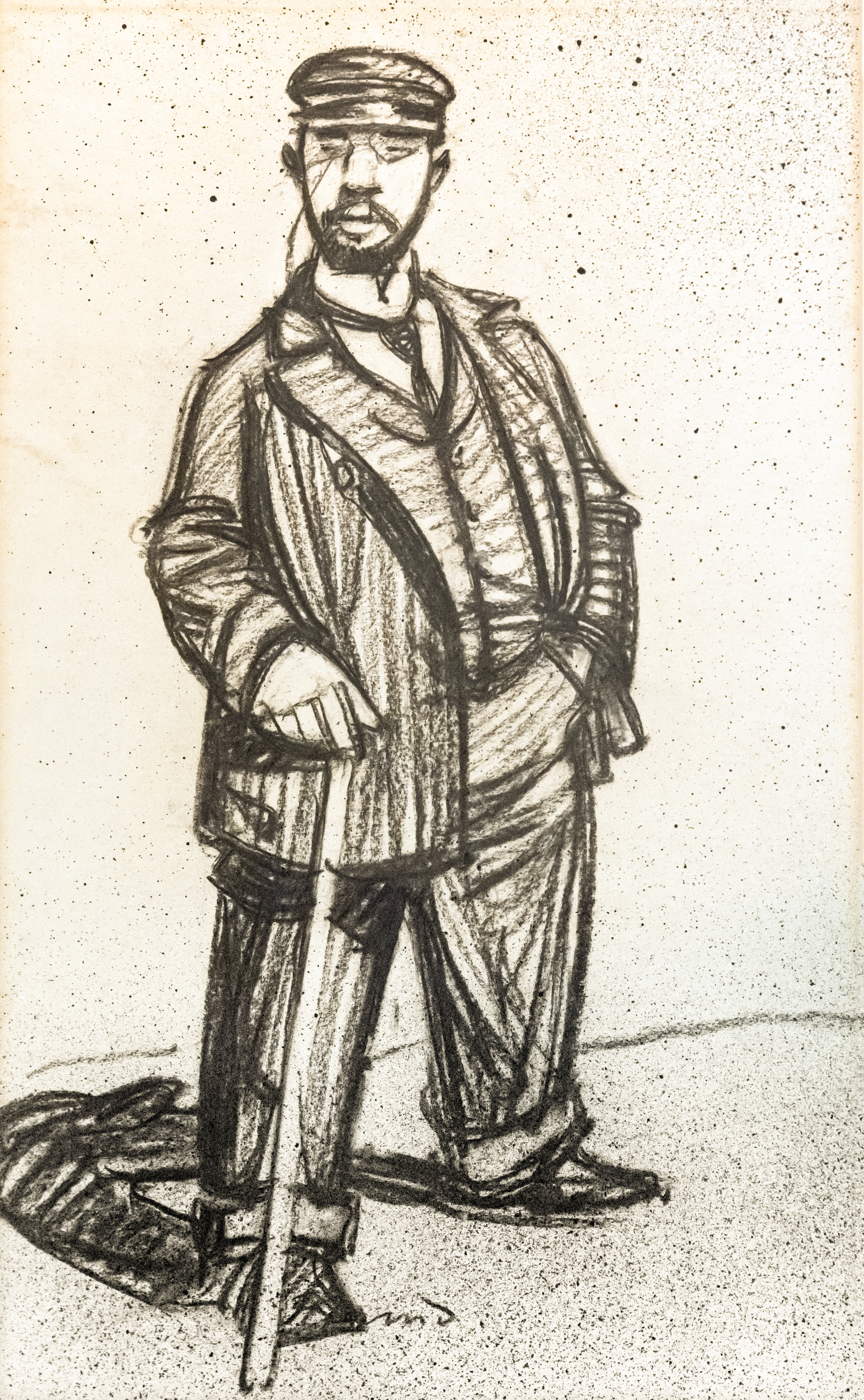
Henri de Toulouse-Lautrec by Maxime Dethomas 1898. Held at Musée Toulouse-Lautrec, Albi

Dethomas and Toulouse-Lautrec's adventures together were not limited to the streets of Paris. If Dethomas' close friend Gabrielle Dorziat is to be believed, during the month of October, 1894, Dethomas and Toulouse-Lautrec travelled to Spain together, stopping at Madrid, Cordoue and Seville. In subsequent years their travels continued, visiting exhibitions, museums and mutual friends or exploring towns such as Granville, Arromanches and Dinard, at which Dethomas had made use of a summerhouse. During the summer of 1895, they journeyed to the coast of Normandy together. From photographs taken by Dethomas at Saint-Malo with the Natansons during one such trip, he later modelled two portraits of Toulouse-Lautrec, both of which are held at the Musée Toulouse-Lautrec.

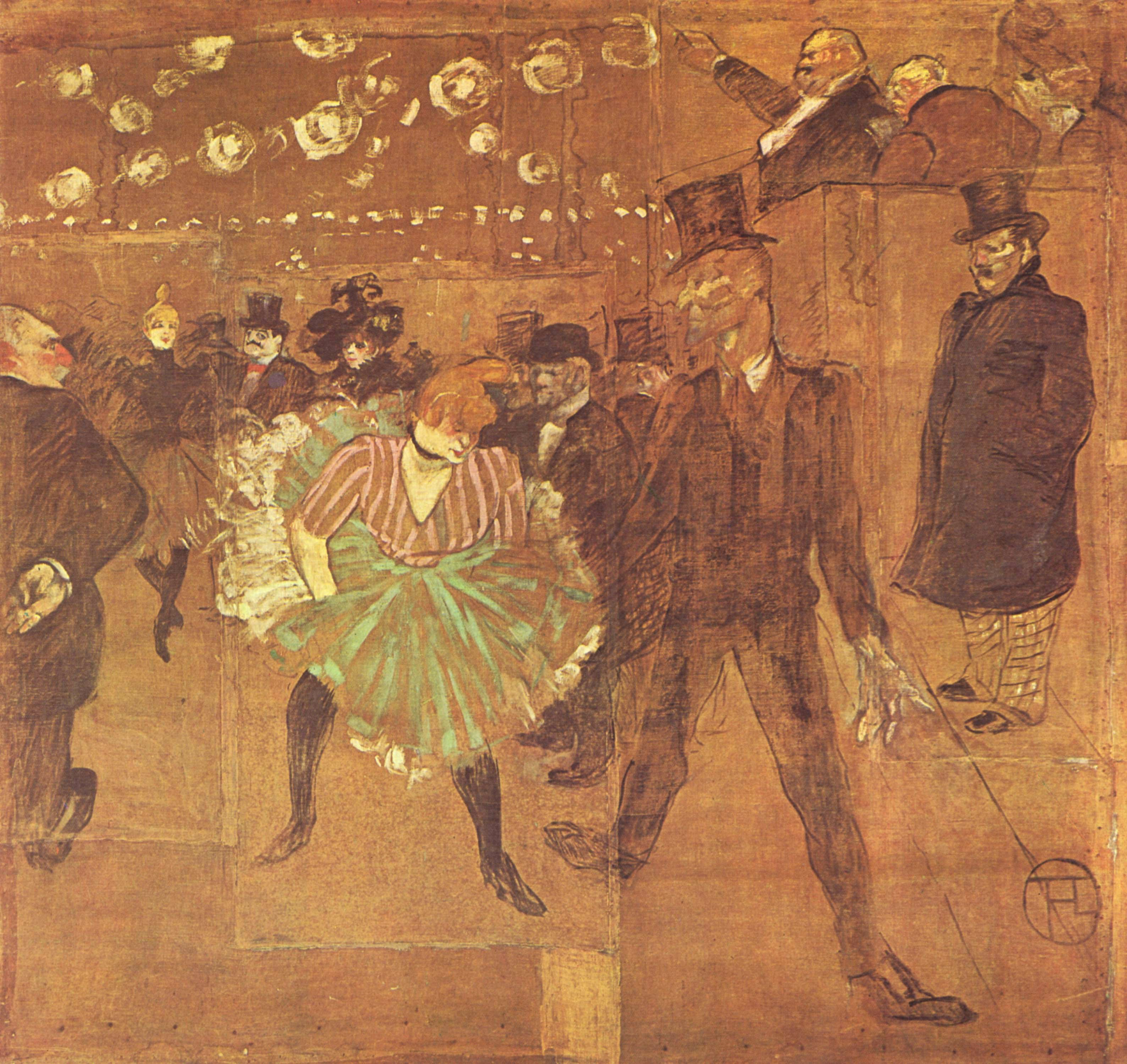
Panneaux pour la baraque de la Goulue by H.T. Lautrec (1895). Maxime Dethomas looks on from the right. Musée d'Orsay, Paris.

From June 20 to July 5, 1897, Dethomas and Toulouse-Lautrec sailed Holland's canals on a barge, visiting Utrecht, the Frans Hals Museum at Haarlem and the island of Walcheren. The trip had been the suggestion of Maxime in a vain attempt at moderating Henri's increasing reliance on alcohol. Accounts differ, but the trip appears to have ended early at Toulouse-Lautrec's behest. Before long, he went into a furious rage and refused to go ashore; children were running behind the barge on the bank of the canal, taking them to be a performing giant-dwarf duo that would perform circus tricks for their delight.

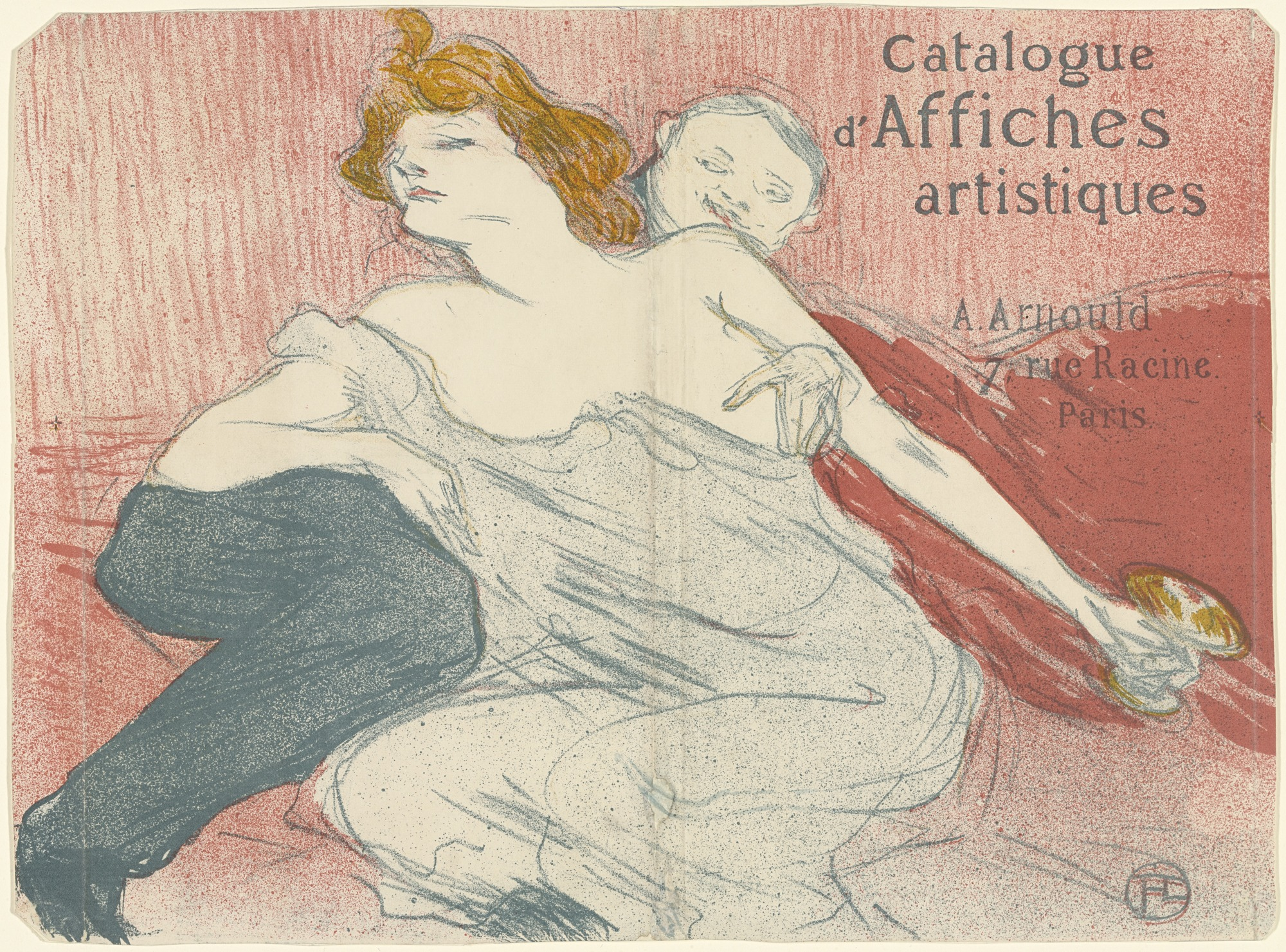
Débauche avec Dethomas (c. June, 1896) - H. T. Lautrec. Taken "from nature", Dethomas is pictured slyly reaching around an unidentified prostitute. A copy of this litho was given by the author to his friend. From Lautrec's hand, this dedication : "Au Gros n'arbre".

During the mid-1890s, Lautrec featured Dethomas in his art with some frequency. On April 6, 1895, the former Moulin Rouge dancer Louise 'La Goulue' Weber commissioned two large canvases to adorn her travelling show's tent. Dethomas appears on the left-hand panel, looking down toward La Goulue. At around the same period, Toulouse-Lautrec declared "I will capture your immobility in places of pleasure", and over the course of one and a half years, he made numerous preparatory sketches of Dethomas intended for a single painting, each taking anywhere from five to fifteen minutes to create. Completed in 1896, the famous portrait of Maxime Dethomas at the Bal de l'Opera now hangs in the National Gallery of Art, Washington D.C. Another portrait of his friend took the form of a risque lithograph entitled Debauche Avec Dethomas, and was later used on the cover of an exhibition catalogue of June, 1896. Finally, an 1896 lithograph entitled Anna Held et Baldy also features Dethomas, leering provocatively at the famous stage performer. Toulouse-Lautrec gifted an annotated proof copy of this lithograph to Dethomas.

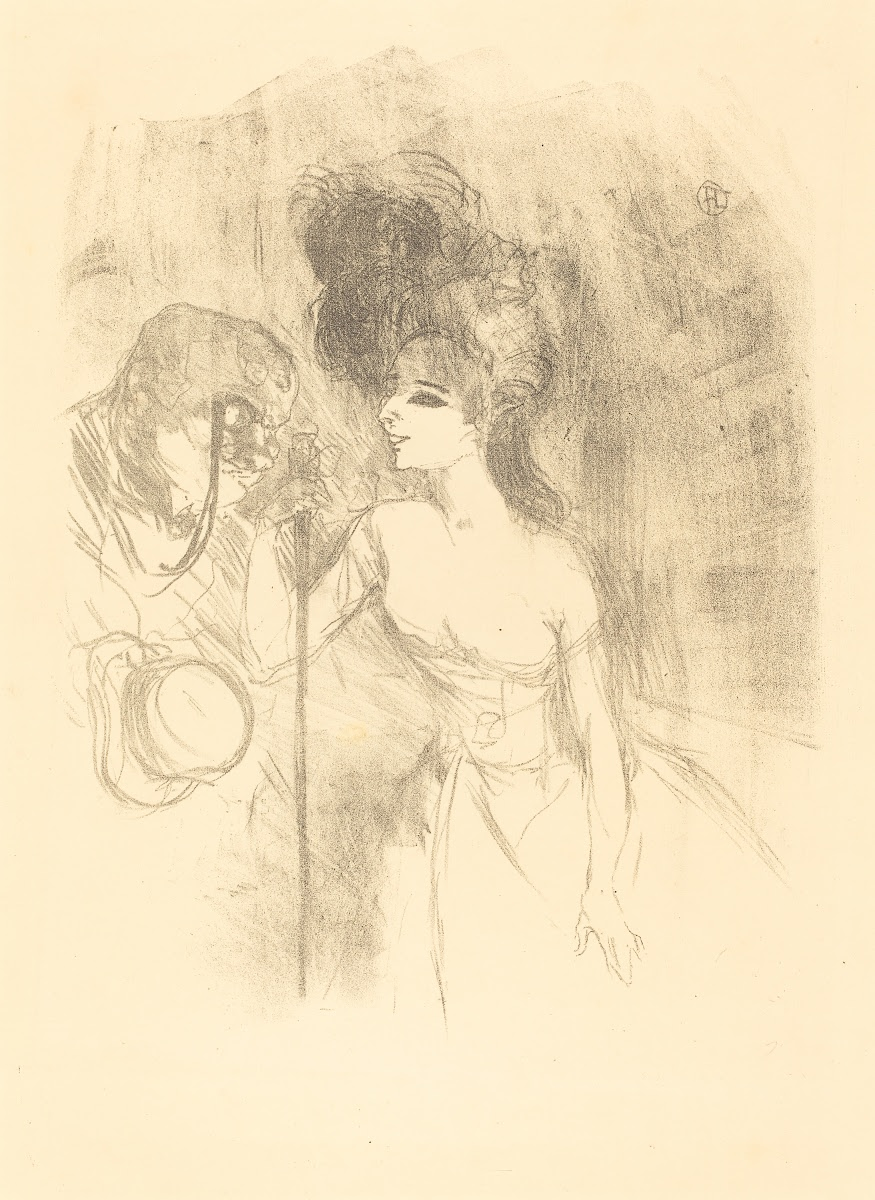
Anna Held et Baldy (1896) - H.T. Lautrec. Lautrec gifted an annotated proof copy of this lithograph to Dethomas.

During the final years of Toulouse-Lautrec's descent into full-blown alcoholism, Dethomas would rarely leave his side, often escorting him to his Montmartre home at the end of long drinking sessions. The two would spend many hours working and talking together at Henri's last Paris studio on avenue Frochot, sometimes sharing the same models, at all times Dethomas attempting to steer conversation away from the topic of alcohol.

Henri's increasingly erratic behaviour was beginning to take its toll on both his family and friends. In a letter from December 8, 1898, Dethomas' discusses a lunch invitation he attended at Toulouse-Lautrec's home, at which Henri's mother was also present. Drama unfolded when conversation turned to Henri's troubles with a pair of naked mouthwash-drinking models – the lunch finally ending with Henri red-faced and shouting at his mother, declaring he could not stand life anymore, and that he will leave for Japan. Eight days later, Dethomas writes again of yet another event that fell victim to Henri's drunkenness, this time a dinner at Goupil's. Things began well, but before dessert had been served, Henri had passed out beneath the dining table, awaking at midnight with loud complaints about how low the ceiling was. "The poor boy is really in a pitiful state of health" Dethomas continued, "senility is approaching, death perhaps."

It's unclear if Toulouse-Lautrec attended Dethomas' first solo exhibition during April 1900, though accounts of the Paris Exposition held the same month describe Henri's health having deteriorated to such an extent that he asked Maxime to push him around the various exhibits in a wheel chair – a request to which he dutifully obliged. The following month, on the suggestion of friends, Toulouse-Lautrec departed Paris for the country. In April 1901, upon hearing news of a stroke, Dethomas traveled to Bordeaux to see his friend. At the end of his stay, Henri recounted that he had taken Gros n'abre to the train station for his return to Paris, and given him a going-away present of two chameleons "who rolled their eyes terribly. We drank cafe au lait together at the station, and he's off like Saint-John the Baptist, the Forerunner, to announce my arrival."

When Dethomas learned of his friend's death, he wrote to his mentor Madame Bulteau, Friday, September 13, 1901:

Dear Lady,

Poor Lautrec is dead, it seems he didn't stop talking about me despite his agony. How curious! I did not think I held such great position in the mind and heart of this poor being. He kept his wits to the end and declared that dying is no small thing, that it was mightily hard. It also appears that in realizing the size of his nose in relation to his shrunken face, he said, pointing to it: "When I am dead it will look like a crouton planted in a dish of spinach!" You see, he stayed himself until the very end!

So the party continues! Giraudat, Tinan, him [Lautrec] and the others. It really seems as though I'm witnessing a battle and I'm on a flank where the lead hits hard and true.

Bulteau's reply of September 16 summed up very well the tone of the relationship between the two friends and the reason for the little man's deep attachment to his Gros n'abre:

"I understand and feel with you the distress caused by Lautrec's death. We always love people more than we think, and when one has sensibilities such as yours, nobody we have touched so lightly and so often can vanish without tearing something from one's heart. I always had the very clear impression that he loved you as best he could love. In those words that he had said of you, one could see his "regard" for the quality of your mind and, no doubt, your sweetness of soul and desire to never show him pity."

=== Jean de Tinan ===
In 1895 Dethomas formed what would become a brief but significant friendship with the young writer, Jean de Tinan. The charismatic twenty-one year old was a new arrival in Paris, and was soon a daily participant in the circuit of bars, cafes and theatres that Dethomas and Lautrec would frequent. Tinan quickly become their "young cadet", Lautrec illustrating the cover of his novel L'Example de Ninon de Lenclos amoureuse, published in May, 1898. Dethomas introduced Tinan to Augustine Bulteau, and she “took charge” of the young writer, guiding him as she had Maxime years before.

It was to her Venice estate that Tinan retreated during the final harrowing months of his short life. A failing heart did not keep him from his work, though his final “sentimental little story” remained unfinished at the time of his death on November 18, 1898. Aimienne, ou le détournement de mineure, was published posthumously; Tinan's final act was to dedicate the unfinished novel to Dethomas, as a “testimony of his deep affection.” As had Lautrec at the beginning of the year, Dethomas contributed lithographs to the publication which adorn the cover – his first such foray into the world of literature and a fitting tribute to his dear friend.

=== Ignacio Zuloaga ===
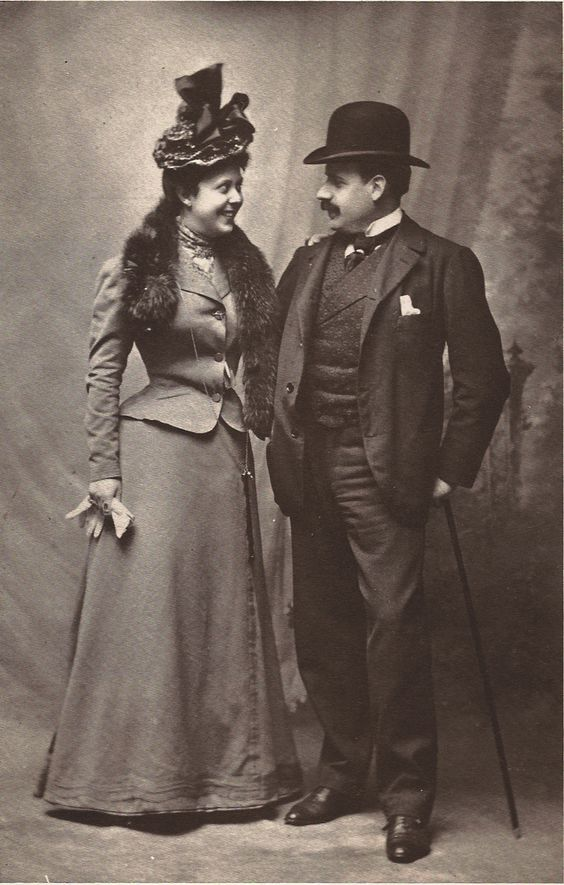
Ignacio Zuloaga and his wife Valentine Dethomas (c. 1900). The couple married May 18, 1899.

Arriving in Paris at the end of 1889 after a disappointing stay in Rome, the young Basque painter Ignacio Zuloaga first met Maxime Dethomas as a fellow student at the studio of Henri Gervex. They shared a deep admiration for Degas and Carrière, and would both later study under Carrière at the Académie de La Palette. More hungry for recognition and success than Dethomas, Zuloaga exhibited enthusiastically at the Salon des Artistes Français, the Barc de Boutteville, the Salon des Indépendants, and the Société Nationale des Beaux-Arts. Fame, however, did not come quickly.

Disappointed, he returned to Andalusia, where he intended to renew his inspiration and craft a new artistic vision – one which would appease the fickle tastes of the Paris art community. By rare chance, Zuloaga and Dethomas ran into each other in Seville, a meeting that proved fortuitous for Zuloaga. Since his return to Spain, he had battled disappointment and poverty, but knew that if he could return again to Paris, he would surely find success.

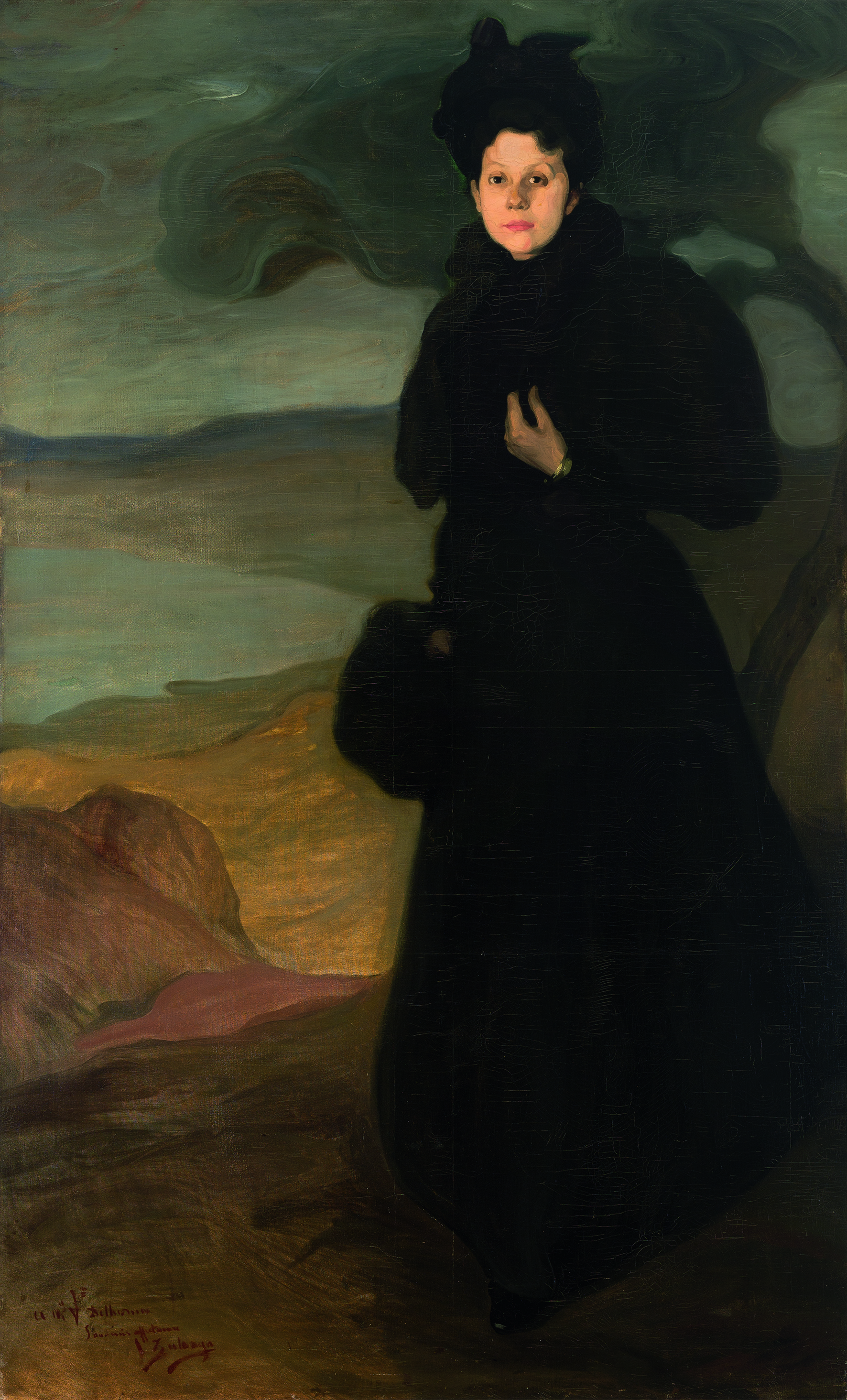
Retrato de Mlle. Valentine Dethomas Ignacio Zuloaga (c. 1895). Oil on canvas. 185 x 115 cm. San Telmo Museoa, Spain

Dethomas' joy at finding his old Montmartre companion under such circumstances soon turned to sadness as Zuloaga explained his dire financial straits and his desperation to return to Paris to revive his artistic career. The seemingly intractable problems of a well-discouraged Ignacio were at once alleviated with a generous offer: "My workshop will be yours as much as it takes. Come to Paris. It's at 9 rue Duperré. Models, I'll find you. Home."

The difficulties thus managed by the goodwill of Maxime, Ignacio returned to Paris in 1894. Presented to Mrs. Marie-Louise Dethomas, mother of Maxime's half-sisters Valentine, Germaine and Alice, Zuloaga was asked to make a portrait of the eldest. This portrait of Valentine would perhaps mark the moment at which their romance was kindled.

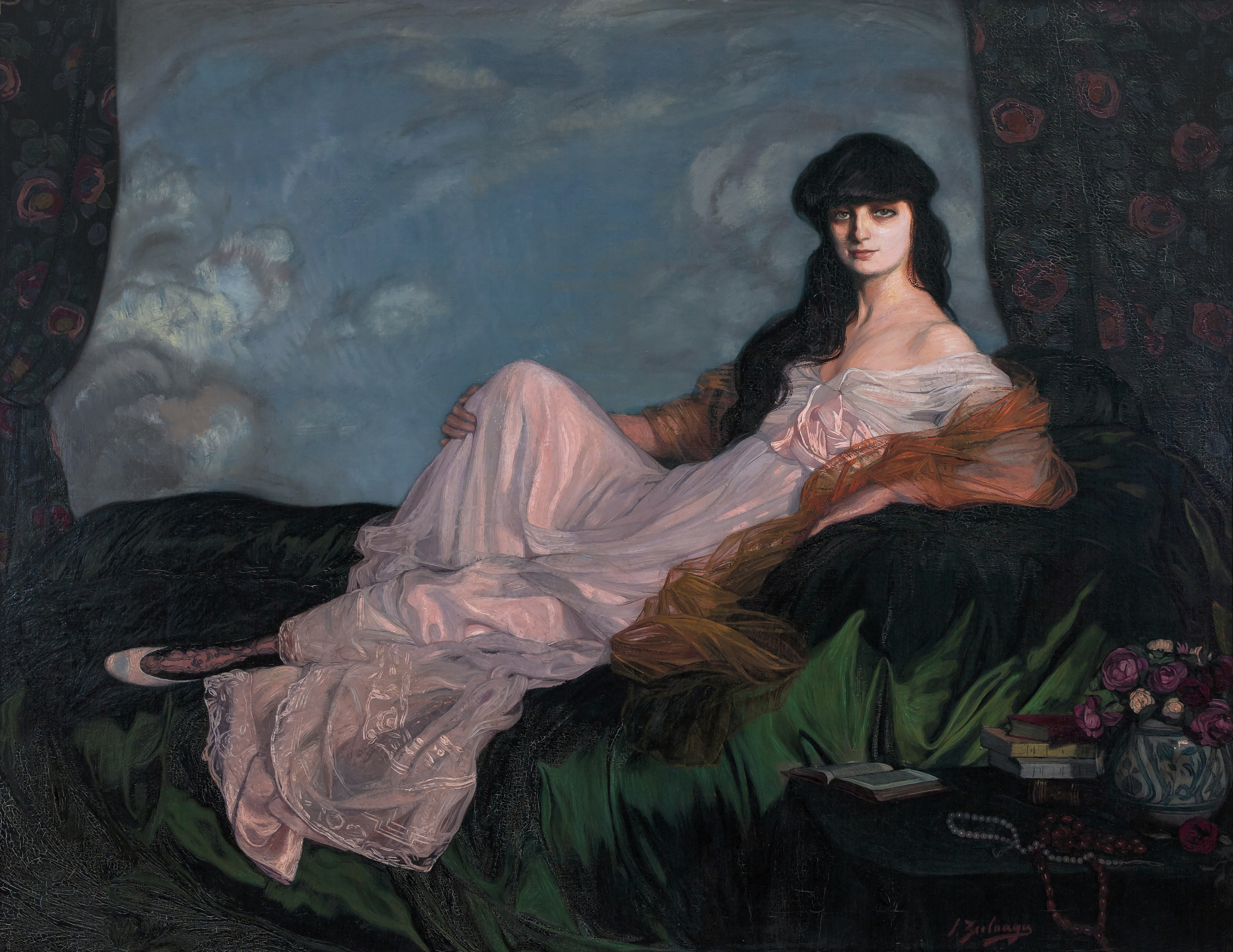
Countess Mathieu de Noailles: Ignacio Zuloaga (1913)

Before the end of 1894, as he did for all his interesting friends, Maxime presented Zuloaga at the salon of Madame Augustine Bulteau. Her considerable reach within the arts community would smooth his path to recognition and ultimately lead to several commissions from her network of expatriate Spanish-speaking habitués, most notably, the 1913 portrait of the writer Anna de Noailles, which would stand as one of Zuloaga's most important works.

On May 18, 1899, in Saint-Philippe-du-Roule, Ignacio Zuloaga, to whom success has just smiled at the Société Nationale des Beaux-Arts, married Valentine Dethomas, with Eugène Carrière and Isaac Albéniz as witnesses. From a friendship born under the auspices of painting; re-invigorated by chance; and nourished by unbridled generosity; the family ties were thus consolidated between the two artists. For the next three decades the pair would stay firm friends.

=== Pierre Louys ===
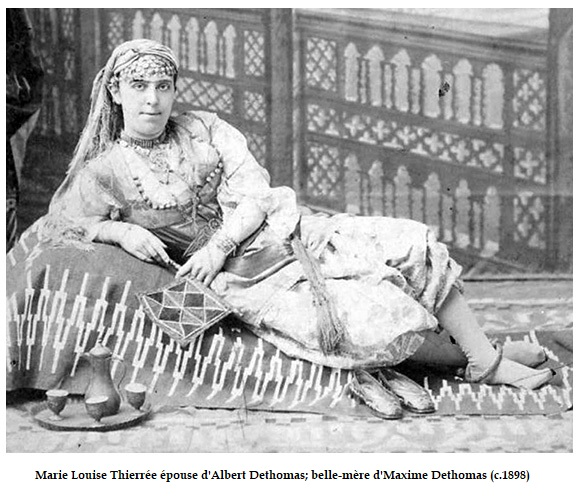
Marie-Louise Thierrée, step-mother of Maxime Dethomas (c. 1898)

The author Pierre Louys was also a close companion of Dethomas and had collaborated with him on the first edition of Le Centaure in 1896. During August and September, 1898, Dethomas acted as a marriage broker of sorts, attempting to bring together his half-sister Germaine and Louys, a plot that was thwarted by Maxime's stepmother, Marie-Louise Thierrée.

=== Marcel Proust ===
Dethomas had a number of prominent writer-friends, one of which was Marcel Proust. Proust made a glowing mention of Dethomas' landscapes of Venice in The Sweet Cheat Gone and discussed the quality of his work after attending an exhibition held at Galerie Durand-Ruel. In a March, 1903 letter to Dethomas, Proust wrote that after having seen his exhibition, he received "a profound initiation to the understanding of nature and love of life." He continued, "it seems that one has gotten from you new eyes to look at life and men and even down to those little windows on the Grand Canal that I would love to juxtapose with yours."

== Exhibitions ==
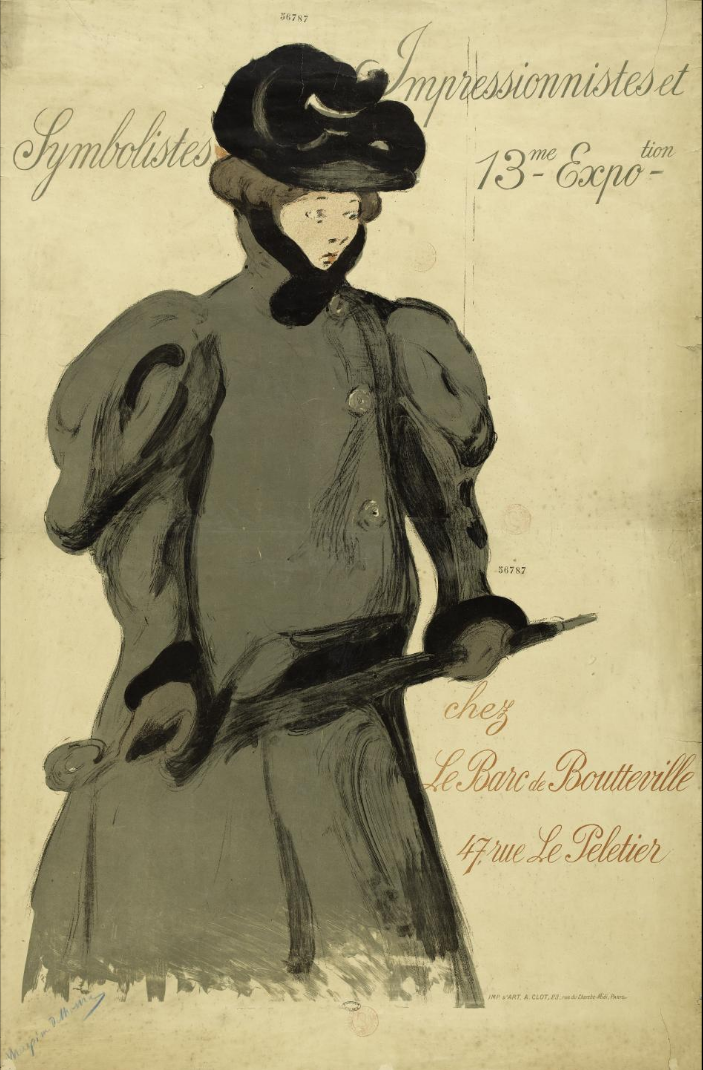
Poster designed by Maxime Dethomas and printed by Auguste Clot for the thirteenth Impressionists and Symbolists exhibition at the Barc de Bouttville, opening December 26, 1896. The original artwork is held at the Musée des Beaux-Arts, Bordeaux.

- 1894 - Exhibited at the 6th (sixième) Impressionistes et Symbolistes exhibition at the Galerie Le Barc de Boutteville, commenced March 2, with Gauguin, Maufra, Jacquemin and others. (Review in Journal des débats politiques et littéraires – March 3, 1894.)
- 1894 - Exhibited at the 7th (septième) Impressionistes et Symbolistes exhibition at the Galerie Le Barc de Boutteville, commenced July 10, with Toulouse-Lautrec, Ibels, Maufra and others. Review makes particular mention of "a delightful pastel, Etude de femme, by M. Dethomas", and "the Woman with the Cup (Femme à la tasse) and Sleep (Sommeil) by Dethomas". (Review in Le Matin : derniers télégrammes de la nuit - July 22, 1894.)
- 1895 - Exhibited at the 8th (huitième) Impressionistes et Symbolistes exhibition at the Galerie Le Barc de Boutteville (commenced November 8). With Anquetin, Toulouse-Lautrec, Roussel and others. Dethomas received a notable mention. (Reviewed in Le Petit Parisien : journal quotidien du soir – November 12, 1894.)
- 1895 - Exhibited at the 9th (neuvième) Impressionistes et Symbolistes exhibition at the Galerie Le Barc de Boutteville (commenced April 27). With Maurice Denis, d'Espagnet, Robbe and others.
- 1895 - Exhibited at the 10th (dixième) Impressionistes et Symbolistes exhibition at the Galerie Le Barc de Boutteville, with Anquetin, Leheutre, d'Espagant, Loiseau, Maillol, Regnier and others. (Reviewed September 19, 1895.)
- 1895 - Exhibited at the Maison de l'Art Nouveau : [Galerie Samuel Bing, December 26, 1895 - January 1896] with Vuillard, Lautrec, Rodin and others. Lot 75 — "Étude de femme en robe orange". An exhibition review of January 4 makes particular mention of "une jolie petite femme en rouge de M. Maxime Dethomas".
- 1896 - Exhibited at the 11th (onzième) Impressionistes et Symbolistes exhibition at the Galerie Le Barc de Boutteville (commenced January 27) with Roussel, Piet and others. Lot entitled "Des fleurs".
- 1896 - Exhibited at the 13th (treizième) Impressionistes et Symbolistes exhibition at the Galerie Le Barc de Boutteville. Mercure de France exhibition review of September, 1896 states: "J'y retins avant tout le monde Dethomas, dont les esquisses sombres sont d'une coloration interessante, d'un gout sur, d'une elegance nerveuse qui fait augurer de serieux resultats."
- 1897 - Exhibited at the 14th (quatorzième) Impressionistes et Symbolistes exhibition at the Galerie Le Barc de Boutteville. La Justice review of July 8 states "Maxime Dethomas a composé une affiche originale pour cette quatorzième exposition, ainsi que des études d'intérieur avec do délicats profils de femmes."
- 1900 - First solo exhibition took place at the Galerie des Artistes Modernes, 19 rue Caumartin (Apr.26 - May 5). Exhibition revue in La Vie Parisienne of May 5, 1900 states:
  Rue Caumartin, l'exposition Maxime Dethomas (une quarantaine tout au plus de cadres), au contraire de tant de déballages picturaux, laisserait désirer un supplément de spectacle. Une série de femmes à mi-corps, décrites d'un fusain gras que réchauffe parfois un peu de pastel ou d'aquarelle. Il y en a deux, vues de dos, avec une Venise froide et bleue dans le fond, qui sont d'une pâte vraiment régalante (no. 47); et une autre, assise de face, avec un corsage arrondi, fait de vermicelles rouges, et des yeux qui ont l'air d'avoir longtemps contemplé une prairie (n" 17). Notez que ces jeunes personnes sont enveloppées d'air respirable, ce qui est, en peinture, plus rare qu'on ne l'imagine, et qu'elles ont pour la plupart je ne sais quelle allure espagnole qui est une des meilleures choses qu'on ait rapportées depuis longtemps de Venise.
- 1901 - Exhibited at Galerie Silberberg, 29 rue Taitbout (Nov.11) with Anquetin, Flandrin and others.
- 1903 - Exhibited (Solo) at Galerie Durand-Ruel, "sketches of Paris and Italy". Exhibition revue in the Gazette des beaux-arts supplement of April 25, 1903 states:
  Son talent s'est formé à l'école'de Carrière et dans le commerce de Toulouse-Lautrec, d'Anquetin et de Zuloaga. La rencontre et la fusion d'enseignemerts aussi dissemblables devaient avoir pour résultante un art libre et à son tour personnel. M. Dethomas saisit et note avec succès le lien qui unit les acteurs d'une même scène; montre-t-il un personnage isolé, il le campe dans une attitude signalétique et lui donne des allures qui atteignent au style. Ses paysages urbains sont pleins de caractère. On lui saura gré, par surcroît, d'avoir marqué les contrastes voulus entre les aspects et la vie de Paris et d'Italie avec le tact d'un observateur réfléchi et sensible.
- 1903 - Exhibited at La Libre Esthétique - Dixième Exhibition in Brussels (Feb.26 - Mar.29) with Denis, Rusinol and others.

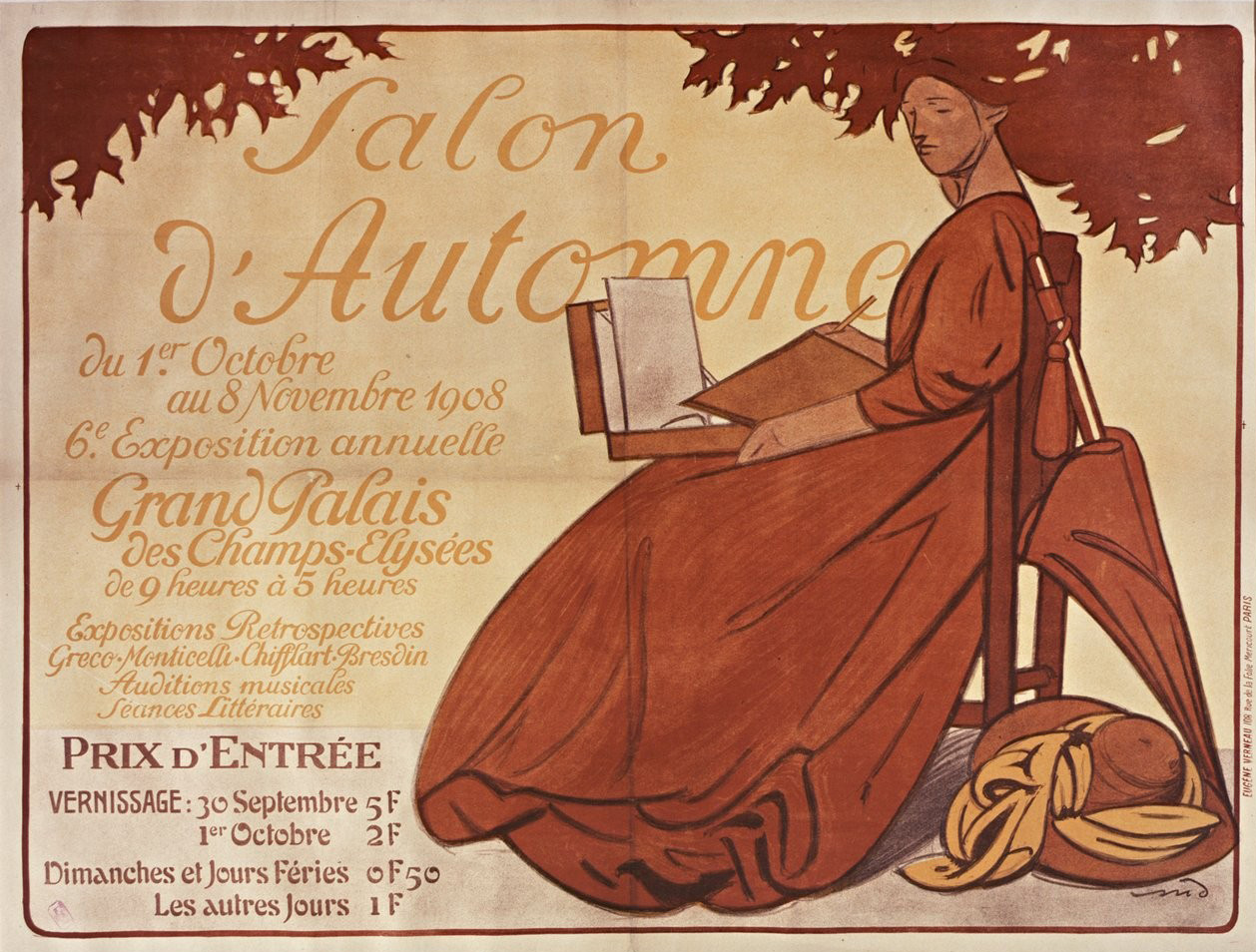
Salon d'Automne 6ème Exposition Annuelle poster (1908) - Designed by Maxime Dethomas; printed by Eugène Verneau (120cm x 160cm)

- 1903 - Exhibited at the 1st Salon d'Automne at the Grand Palais des Champs-Élysées, Paris (Oct.31 - Dec.6). Three aquarelles (lot 655–657) titled: L'Epave, Le chasseur, Franche Lippee.
- 1904 - Exhibited at the St. Louis World's Fair, United States (Apr.30 to Dec.1). A drawing (Lot 595) titled: A Chat.
- 1904 - Exhibited at the 2nd Salon d'Automne at the Grand Palais des Champs-Élysées, Paris (Oct.15 - Nov.15). Seven drawings (lot 1420–1426) titled: Transteverine, Venitienne, Parisienne, Le premier violin, Le second violin, La violincelliste, Le trombonne.
- 1905 - Exhibited at the 3rd Salon d'Automne at the Grand Palais des Champs-Élysées, Paris. Five drawings (lot 461–465) titled: Au moment du cafe, Le Conferencier, Premiere Auditrice, Seconde Auditrice and L'Arpette.
- 1906 - Exhibited (solo) at the Galerie de l'Art Decoratif [7 rue Laffitte] (Apr.23 - May.17) Sketches and charcoals of Venice and its people later used to illustrate Regnier's book Esquisses Venetiennes.
- 1906 - Exhibited at the 4th Salon d'Automne at the Grand Palais des Champs-Élysées, Paris (Oct.6 - Nov.15). Eight drawings (lot 464–471) titled: L’Inamovable, La Cliente de la Cremerie, Les Ouvreuses, L’Age ingrat, L’Habituee du petit Bar, Dans le Promenoir d’un music-hall, Les Trottinuers and Les Recits de l’experience.
- 1907 - Exhibited at the 5th International Exposition of Barcelona, with Zualoga and Rodin.
- 1907 - Exhibited at the 1st Salon de Humoristes at the Palais de Glace with Forain and others.
- 1907 - Exhibited at La Comédie Humaine (Galerie Georges Petit) with Forain, Degas and others.
- 1907 - Exhibited at the 5th Salon d'Automne at the Grand Palais des Champs-Élysées, Paris (Oct.1 - Oct.27) Six drawings (lot 458 – 463) entitled : Sollicite et Solliciteur, Sous l’œil des Barbares, L’Indifferent, Un Croquis, La Lettre, Etude.
- 1908 - Exhibited at the 2nd Salon de Humoristes at the Palais de Glace with Forain and others.
- 1908 - Exhibited at the Exposition de la Toison d'or, Moscow.
- 1908 - Exhibited at La Comédie Humaine (Galerie Georges Petit) with Lautrec, Dresa and others.
- 1908 - Exhibited with Rodin and Zuloaga at the Kunstverein, Frankfurt, Germany.
- 1911 - Exhibited at the 10th Salon d'Automne in the Grand Palais
- 1911 - Exhibited (solo) drawings and sketches at Galerie Druet (Mar.27 - Apr.8). l’Action Francaise review of March 30 states:
  Le talent sobre et vigoureux de ce grand artiste qu'est Maxime Dethomas se manifeste ici en une centaine de pièces de tout premier ordre, quelques-unes destinées à l'illustration d'ouvrages connus, d'autres libres, spontanées et d'un mouvement incomparable. Par la puissance et la netteté du trait, par la cruauté de l'observation, par une ironie profonde et naturelle, Dethomas s'apparente à Daumier. Il est comme Daumier, un moraliste, et sa verve, même caricaturale, devient aisément lyrique. Nous recommandons au visiteur Le Colporteur et le Socialiste, le Passage de l'Express, La Mauvaise Amie et enfin un Adieu où la mélancolie de deux visages rapprochés atteint à la plus haute poésie. Bien au-dessus de ses émules, qui ne cherchent dans l'actualité qu'un amusement ou un prétexte à cocasserie, Maxime Dethomas typifie la vie quotidienne et les rencontres du salon, du cercle, du bar, de la rue. Il est dès aujourd'hui un des premiers représentants de l'art français contemporain.
- 1911 - Exhibited at the International Exhibition of Turin (Apr. – Nov.).
- 1911 - Exhibited at La Libre Esthétique, Bruxelles (Mar.18 - Apr.23) with Vuillard, Denis and others.
- 1911 - Exhibited with the Exposition annuelle 2eme groupe at Galerie Druet (Mar.13 - 25) with Baignières, Desvallières, Dufrénoy, Fleming, Guerin, Marque, Marval, Piot, Rouault, Jaulmes and Lacoste.
- 1912 - Exhibited at Galerie Druet with Baignieres, Desvallieres, Flandrin, Geurin, Marquet, Marval, Piot and Rouault (Feb.5 – 17)
- 1912 - Exhibited at the Artz and De Bois in The Hague, Netherlands (Mar. - Apr.) with Bussy and Huszar
- 1913 - Exhibited with the Exposition annuelle 2eme groupe at Galerie Druet (Feb.17 - Mar.1) with Baignères, Desvallières, Dufrénoy, Fleming, Guerin, Marque, Marval, Rouault and Mare.
- 1913 - Exhibited at the Societa Leonardo da Vinci (May. 11 – 31), in Florence, Italy.
- 1914 - Exhibited with the Exposition annuelle 2eme groupe at Galerie Druet (Feb.9 - 21) with Baignères, Desvallières, Dufrénoy, Fleming, Guerin, Marque, Mrs Marval, Rouault, Bernouard and Moreau.
- 1915 - Exhibited two framed drawings in the French Pavilion of the Panama-Pacific International Exposition (PPIE) Worlds Fair, San Francisco, U.S.A.
- 1916 - Exhibited at the Detroit Museum of Art, U.S.A. The exhibition of PPIE works. (October Exhibition Catalogue) Lot. 80 - "Yvonne", Lot. 81 - "Jeanne"
- 1917 - Exhibited with the Exposition annuelle 2eme groupe at Galerie Druet (May. 7 – 25) with Desvallières, Dufrénoy, Fleming, Guerin, Marque, Marval, Rouault and Barbier
- 1922 - Exhibited at the Musée des Arts Décoratifs, Louvre, Paris (Apr.12 - May. 7) with Emile Decoeur, Albert Marque and Paul Follot.
- 1928 - Exhibited (solo) drawings and watercolours at the Galerie Simonson, Paris (Mar.20 - Apr.5).
- 1929 - Exhibited at the Salon d'Automne, Paris. Retrospective including paintings, drawings, posters, illustrations, decorations etc.
- 1992 - Exhibited (solo) at the Musée d'Orsay, Paris (Feb.25 - May.24).
- 2016 - Exhibited at the Museo de Bellas Artes de Granada, Spain (Jun.30 - Sept.18)

== Publications ==
Dethomas made an important contribution to the renaissance of book production in France. The following list gives a broad representation of Dethomas' artistic contributions to published literary works:

- Collectif, Le Centaure, Vol 1, 1896
- Jean de Tinan, Aimienne, Ou le Detournement de Mineure, 1899
- Henri de Regnier, Esquisses Venetiennes, 1906
- Paul Adam, Le Trust, 1910
- Eugène Montfort, La Turque - Roman Parisian, 1912
- Jean Giraudoux, Amica America, 1918
- François Chateaubriand, La Campagne Romaine, 1919
- Jean Giraudoux, Adieu à la Guerre, 1919
- Rudyard Kipling, La Plus Belle Histoire du Monde, 1919
- Jean and Jérome Tharaud, Dingley l'illustre écrivain, 1920
- Paul Claudel, Tete D’or Drame, 1920
- Andre Lebey, Jean de Tinan, 1921
- Boileau Despreaux, Le Lutrin, 1921
- Jaques Cazotte, Le Diable Amoureux, 1921
- Jean de Tinan, Noctambulismes, 1921
- Andre Maurois, Ariel ou la Vie de Shelly, 1922
- Arthur Gobineau, Scaramouche, 1922
- Molière, Theatre Complet, 1923
- Albert Touchard, La Mort du Loup, 1924
- Edmond Jaloux, Le Reste est Silence, 1924
- Jean Giraudoux, Le Couvent de Bella, 1925
- Henry Prunières, La vie et l`oeuvre de Claudio Monteverdi, 1926
- Anatole France, Ouvers Completes Illustrees, Tome I, IX, XIII, 1925–27
- François Couperin, Les Folies Françaises, ou les Dominos, 1927
- Pedro Calderón de la Barca, La Mojiganga de la muerte, 1927
- Charles de Saint-Cyr, Sous le Signe du Caribou, 1928
- François Mauriac, La Nuit du Bourreau de Soi-meme, 1929
- Alphonse Daudet, Sapho, 1929

Henri de Régnier's Esquisses Vénitiennes (1906) represents Dethomas' first major exercise in book illustration. Whilst he had been visiting Venice each winter for several years, and accumulating a considerable portfolio of work in the process, the collaboration with Regnier for this project uniquely combined previously completed stand-alone coloured artworks, and a suite of black and white sketches in charcoal and conté explicitly intended for use 'in-text'. In conjunction with the release of the book, Dethomas held an exhibition of the book's artworks at the Galerie de l'Art Decoratif, which was both a popular and critical success.

Dethomas' bold xylographic style lent itself well to the woodcut lithographic process, and the in-text illustrations in Esquisses Vénitiennes set a standard by which Dethomas' subsequent illustration projects would follow. Employing the skills of engravers such as Léon Pichon and Emile Gasperini, his black and white drawings found their way into sitting rooms and libraries around the world.

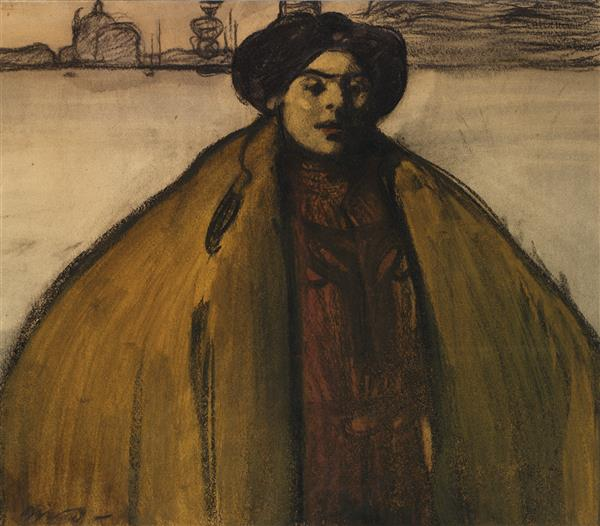
Maxime Dethomas: original planche No.1, Henri de Régnier's Esquisses Vénitiennes (1906).

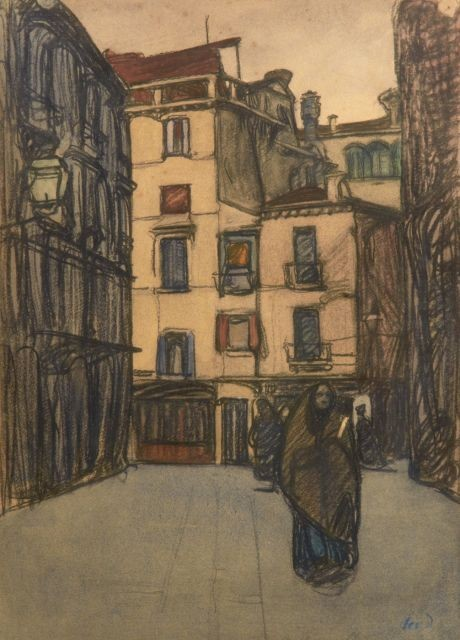
Maxime Dethomas: original planche No.4, Henri de Régnier's Esquisses Vénitiennes (1906).

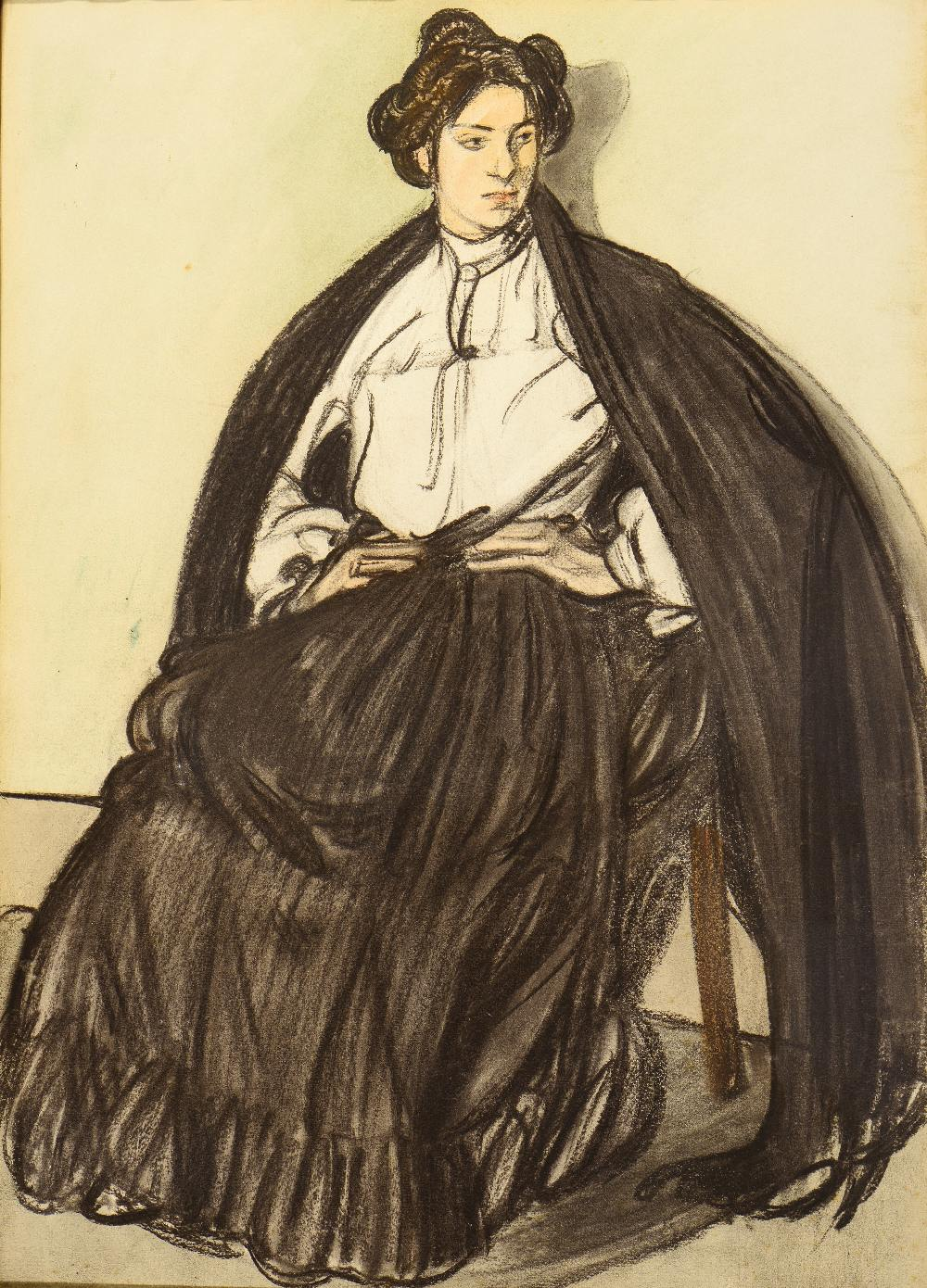
Maxime Dethomas: original planche No.5, Henri de Régnier's Esquisses Vénitiennes (1906).

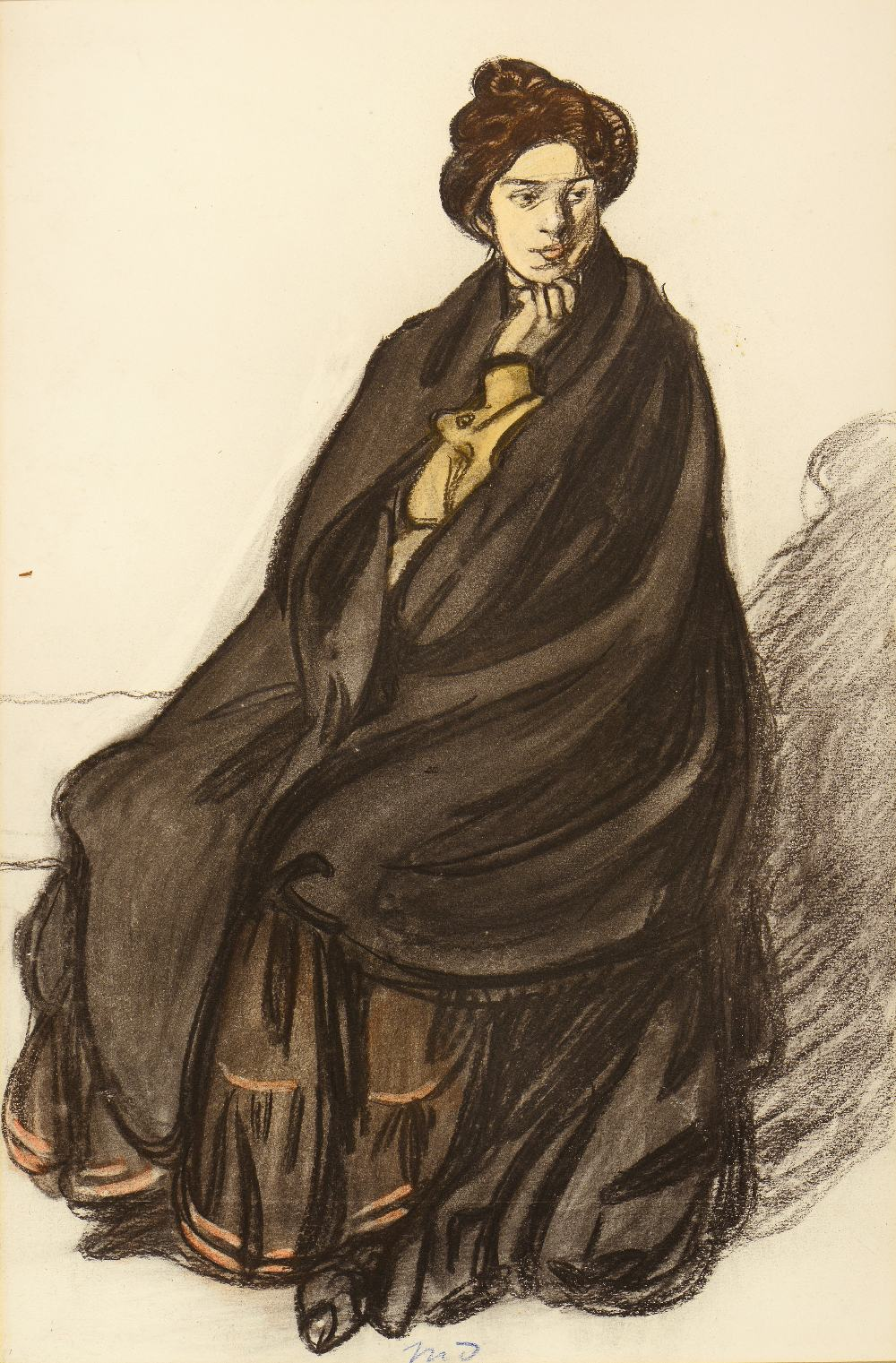
Maxime Dethomas: unused illustration for Henri de Régnier's Esquisses Vénitiennes (1906).

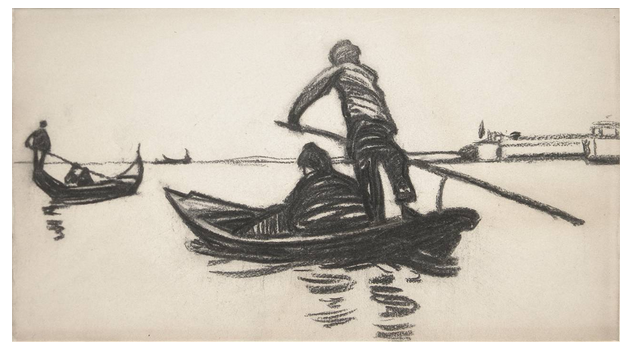
Maxime Dethomas: original in-text Illustration p. 31, Henri de Régnier's Esquisses Vénitiennes (1906).

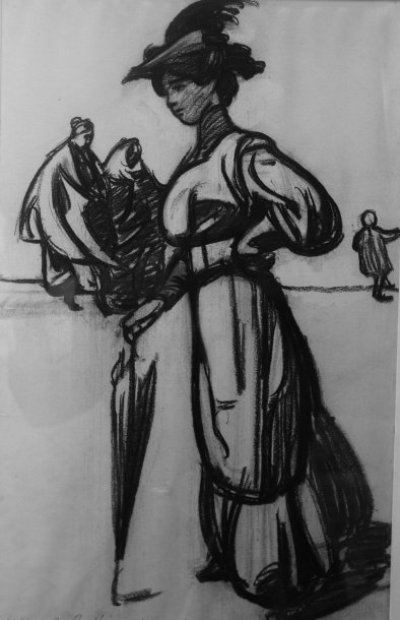
Maxime Dethomas: original in-text Illustration p. 40, Henri de Régnier's Esquisses Vénitiennes (1906).

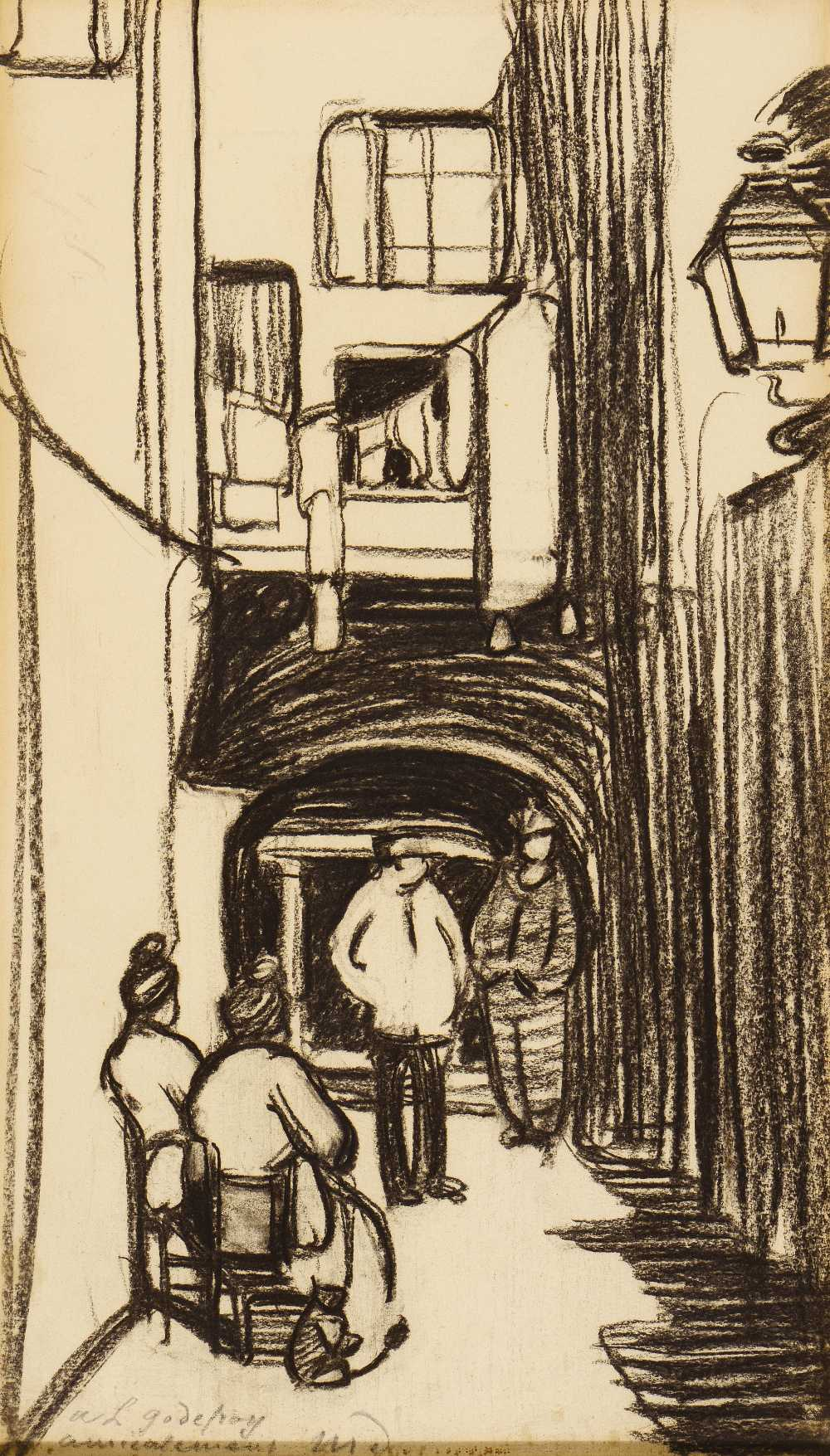
Maxime Dethomas: original in-text Illustration p. 46, Henri de Régnier's Esquisses Vénitiennes (1906).

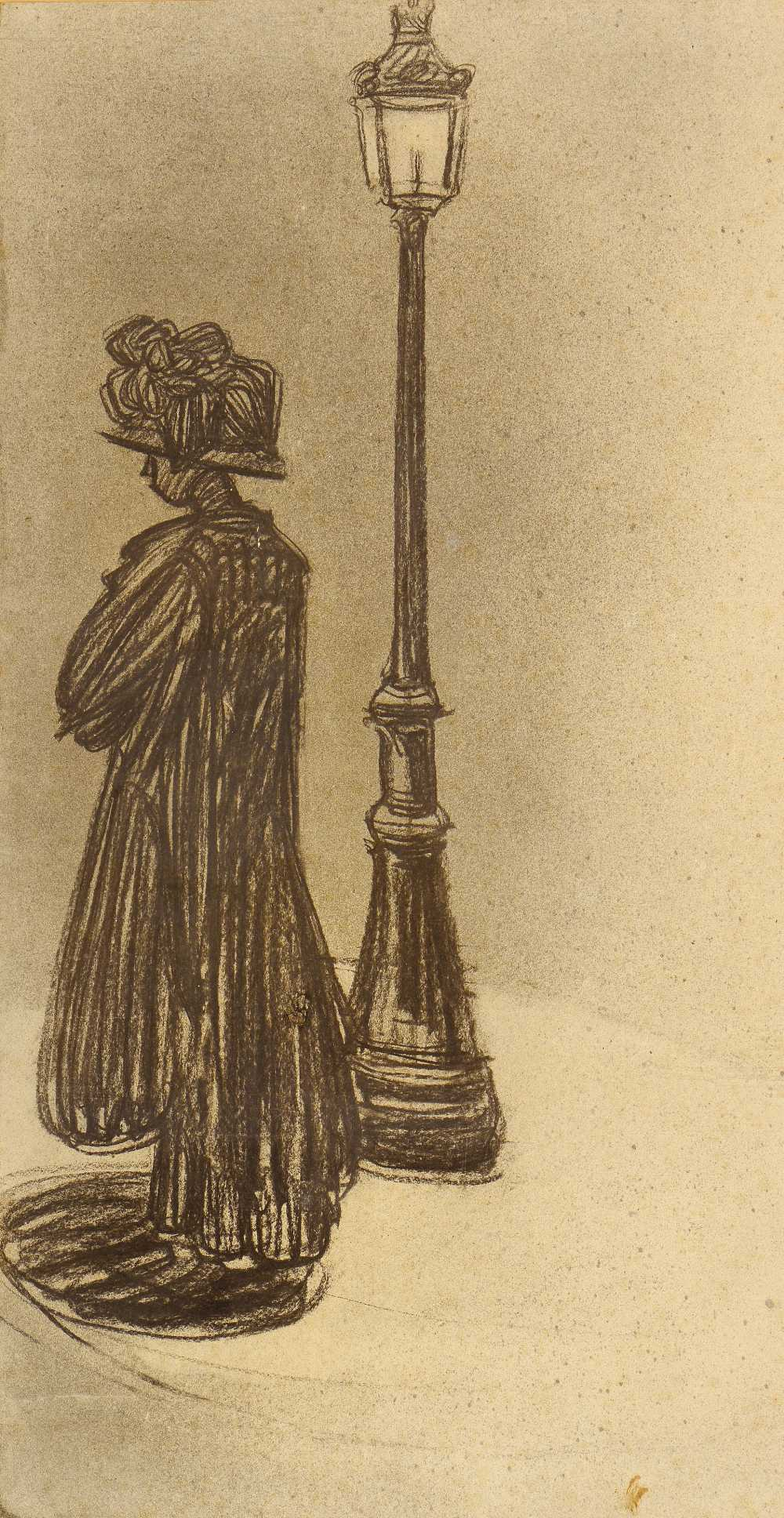
Maxime Dethomas: original illustration for Eugène Montfort's La Turque - Roman Parisian (1912).
