= Odilon Redon =

French painter (1840–1916)

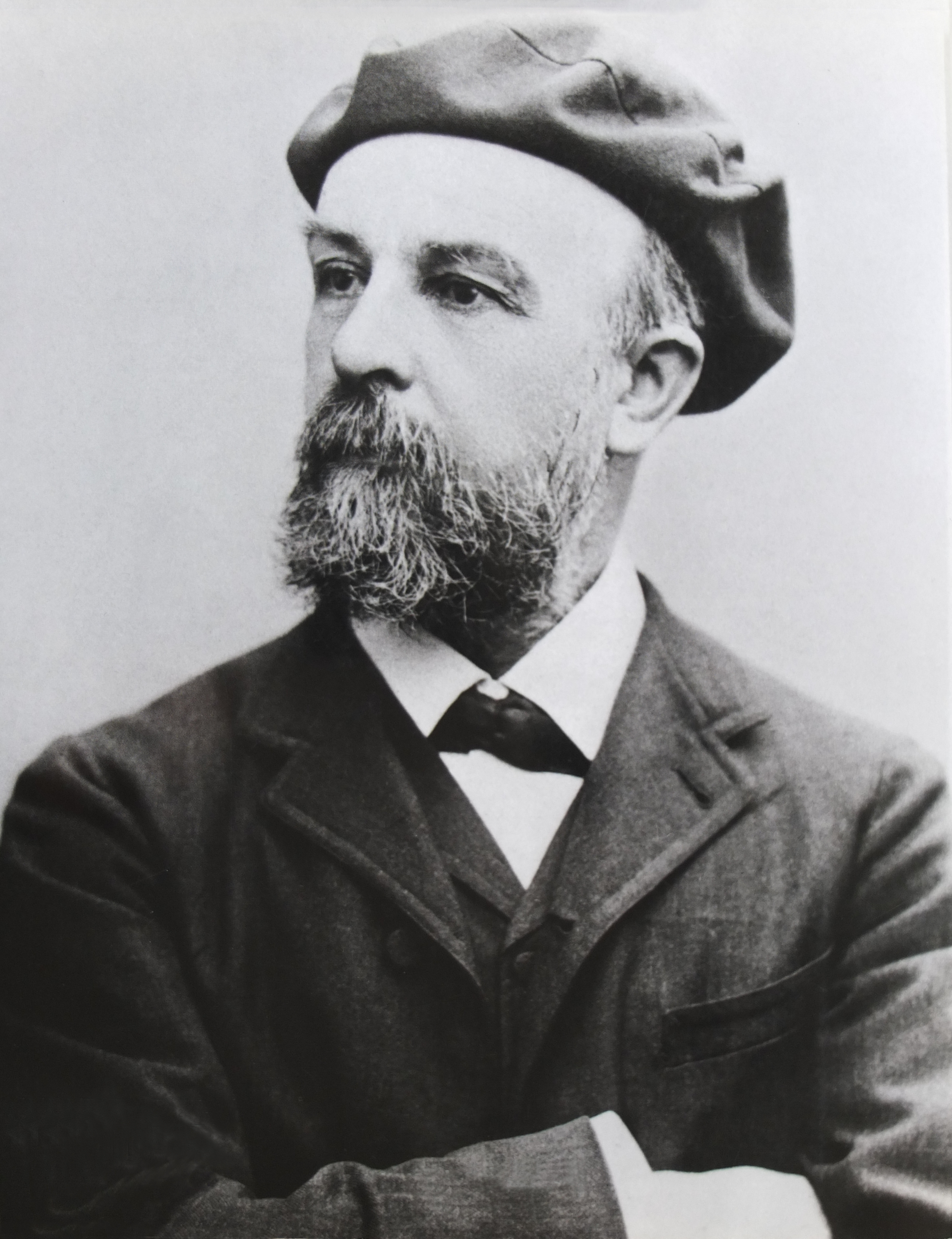
- Photograph, around 1880
- Born: Bertrand Redon; 20 April 1840; Bordeaux, France
- Died: 6 July 1916 (aged 76); Paris, France
- Education: Atelier of Jean-Léon Gérôme
- Known for: Painting, printmaking, drawing
- Movement: Post-Impressionism, Symbolism
- Spouse: Camille Falte
- Children: 1

Odilon Redon (born Bertrand Redon; French: [ɔdilɔ̃ ʁədɔ̃]; 20 April 1840 – 6 July 1916) was a French Symbolist draughtsman, printmaker, and painter.

Early in his career, both before and after fighting in the Franco-Prussian War, Redon worked almost exclusively in charcoal and lithography, works known as his noirs. He gained recognition after his drawings were mentioned in the 1884 novel À rebours (Against Nature) by Joris-Karl Huysmans. During the 1890s, Redon began working in pastel and oil, which quickly became his favorite medium, abandoning his previous style of noirs completely after 1900. He developed a keen interest in Hindu and Buddhist religion and culture, which increasingly showed in his work.

Redon is perhaps best known today for the dreamlike paintings created in the first decade of the 20th century, which were inspired by Japanese art and leaned toward abstraction. His work is considered a precursor to Surrealism.

== Early life ==
Odilon Redon was born, on 20 April 1840, in Bordeaux, Aquitaine, to a prosperous family. Redon's father made his fortune in the slave trade in Louisiana in the 1830s. Redon was conceived in New Orleans and his parents made the transatlantic journey back to France while his French Creole mother, Marie Guérin, was pregnant with him. The young Bertrand Redon acquired the nickname "Odilon" from his mother's first name, Odile. Redon started drawing as a child; at the age of ten, he was awarded a drawing prize at school. He began the formal study of drawing at fifteen but, at his father's insistence, he changed to architecture. Failure to pass the entrance exams at Paris' École des Beaux-Arts ended any plans for a career as an architect, although he briefly studied painting there under Jean-Léon Gérôme in 1864. (His younger brother Gaston Redon would become a noted architect.)

Back in his native Bordeaux, he took up sculpting, and Rodolphe Bresdin instructed him in etching and lithography. His artistic career was interrupted in 1870 when he was drafted to serve in the army in the Franco-Prussian War until its end in 1871.

== Career ==
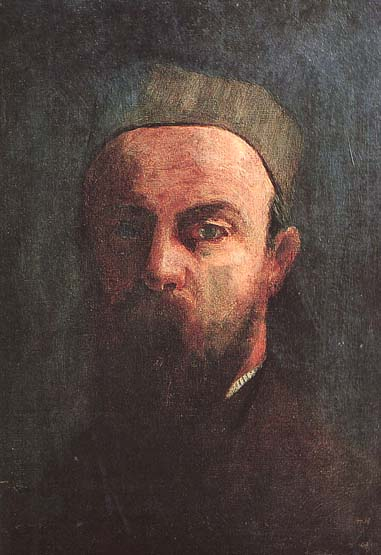
Self-Portrait, 1880, Musée d'Orsay

At the end of the war, Redon moved to Paris and resumed working almost exclusively in charcoal and lithography. He called his visionary works, conceived in shades of black, his noirs. It was not until 1878 that his work gained any recognition with Guardian Spirit of the Waters; he published his first album of lithographs, titled Dans le Rêve, in 1879. Still, Redon remained relatively unknown until the appearance in 1884 of a cult novel by Joris-Karl Huysmans titled À rebours (Against Nature). The story featured a decadent aristocrat who collected Redon's drawings.

In 1886, Redon exhibited his work with the Impressionists in their last exhibition. The same year, he also began participating in the exhibitions of Les XX in Brussels.

In the 1890s, Redon worked in pastel and oil; he did not make noirs after 1900. In 1899, he exhibited with the Nabis at Durand-Ruel's.

Redon had a keen interest in Hindu and Buddhist religion and culture. The figure of the Buddha increasingly showed in his work. Influences of Japonisme blended into his art, such as the painting The Death of the Buddha around 1899, The Buddha in 1906, Jacob and the Angel in 1905, and Vase with Japanese Warrior in 1905, among others.

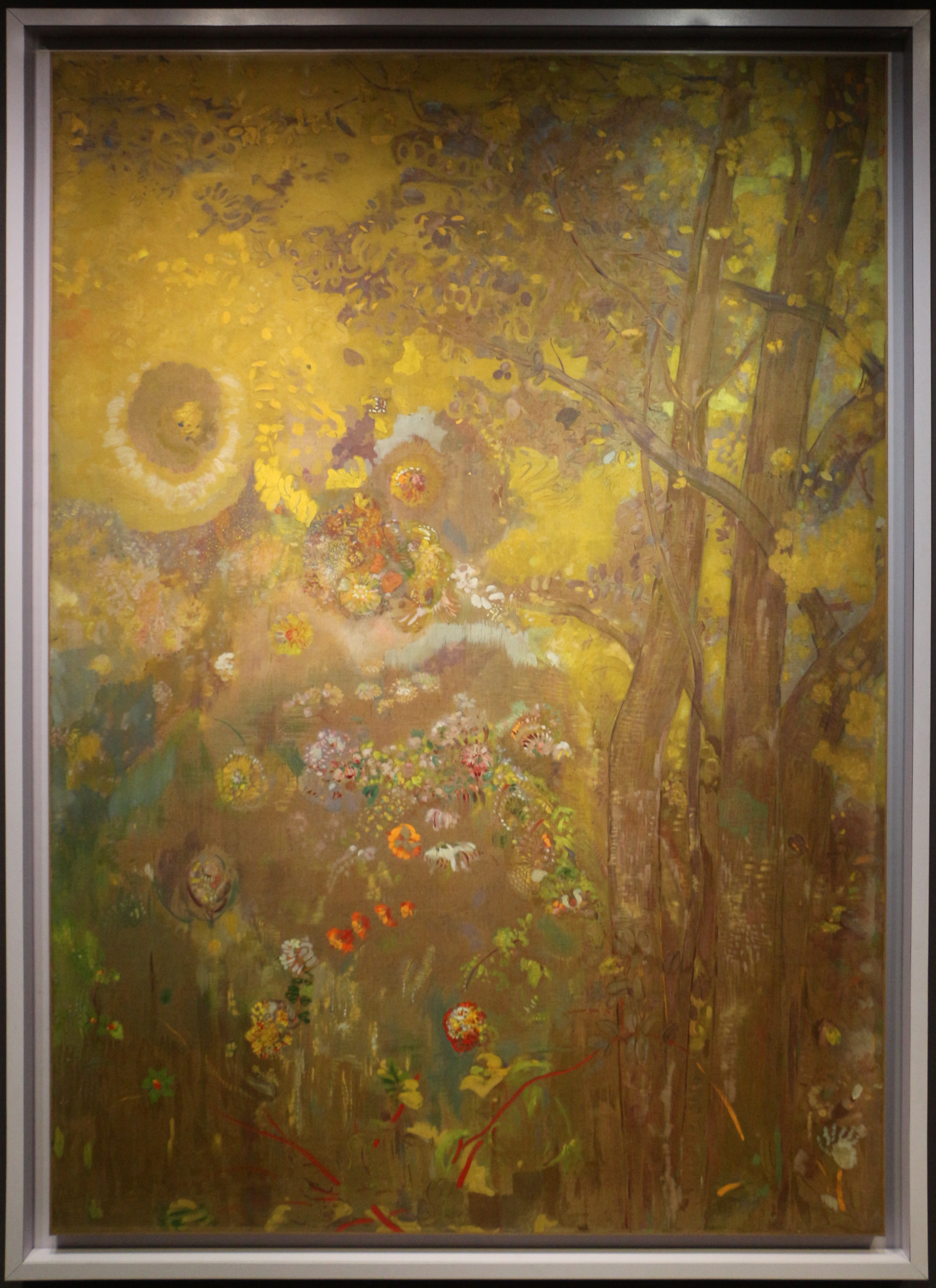
Trees on a yellow Background, one of the panels painted in 1901 for the dining room of the Château de Domecy-sur-le-Vault

Baron Robert de Domecy (1867–1946) commissioned Redon in 1899 to create 17 decorative panels for the dining room of the Château de Domecy-sur-le-Vault near Sermizelles in Burgundy. Redon had created large decorative works for private residences in the past, but his compositions for the château de Domecy in 1900–1901 were his most radical compositions to that point and mark the transition from ornamental to abstract painting. The landscape details do not show a specific place or space. Only details of trees, twigs with leaves, and budding flowers in an endless horizon can be seen. The colors used are mostly yellow, grey, brown and light blue. The influence of the Japanese painting style found on folding screens, byōbu, is discernible in his choice of colors and the rectangular proportions of most of the up to 2.5 metres high panels. Fifteen of them are located today in the Musée d'Orsay, acquired in 1988.

Domecy also commissioned Redon to paint portraits of his wife and their daughter Jeanne, two of which are in the collections of the Musée d'Orsay and the Getty Museum in California. Most of the paintings remained in the Domecy family collection until the 1960s.

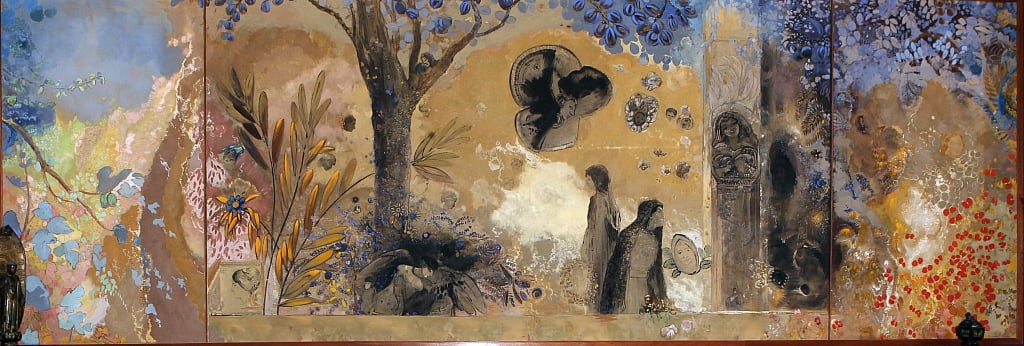
The Night, c. 1910–1911, part of a series of decorative panels by Odilon Redon commissioned by Gustave Fayet and located in the Fontfroide Abbey library

== Personal life ==
At the age of 40, Redon married Camille Falte, a young Creole from Île Bourbon. They had a son, Arï Redon (30 April 1889 – 13 May 1972 in Paris). A visual artist himself and subject of his father's portraiture as a child, Arï's partner was Suzanne Redon.

Redon died on 6 July 1916 in Paris.

== Reception and interpretations of his work ==
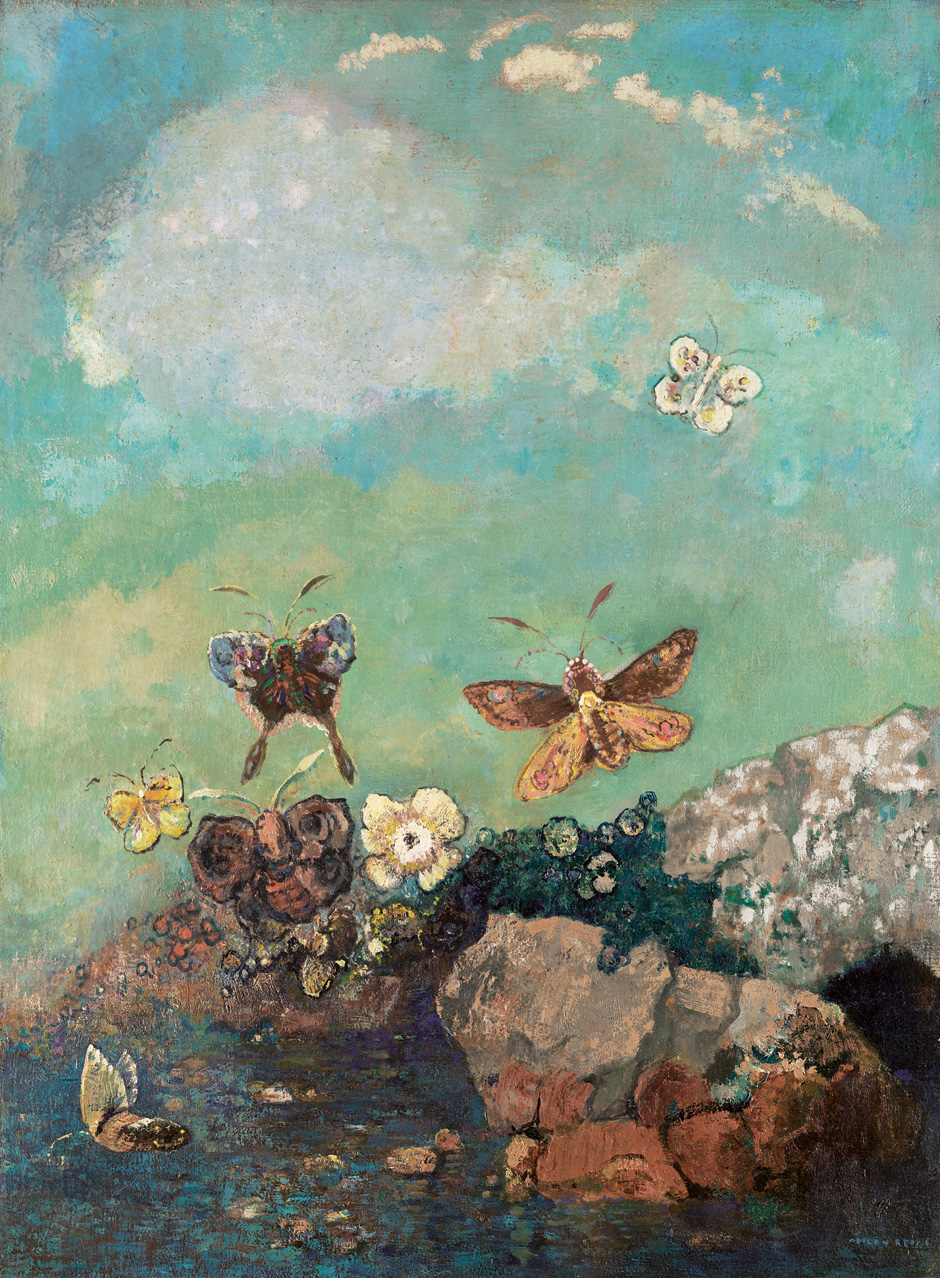
Butterflies, around 1910 (Museum of Modern Art)

During his early years as an artist, Redon's works were described as "a synthesis of nightmares and dreams", as they contained dark, fantastical figures from the artist's own imagination. His work represents an exploration of his internal feelings and psyche. Redon wanted to place "the logic of the visible at the service of the invisible". A telling source of Redon's inspiration and the forces behind his works can be found in his journal A Soi-même (To Myself). Of his process he wrote:

I have often, as an exercise and as a sustenance, painted before an object down to the smallest accidents of its visual appearance; but the day left me sad and with an unsatiated thirst. The next day I let the other source run, that of imagination, through the recollection of the forms and I was then reassured and appeased.

Redon's drawings are characterized as mysterious and evocative by Joris-Karl Huysmans in the following passage from the novel À rebours (1884):

Those were the pictures bearing the signature: Odilon Redon. They held, between their gold-edged frames of unpolished pearwood, undreamed-of images: a Merovingian-type head, resting upon a cup; a bearded man, reminiscent both of a Buddhist priest and a public orator, touching an enormous cannon-ball with his finger; a spider with a human face lodged in the centre of its body. Then there were charcoal sketches which delved even deeper into the terrors of fever-ridden dreams. Here, on an enormous die, a melancholy eyelid winked; over there stretched dry and arid landscapes, calcinated plains, heaving and quaking ground, where volcanos erupted into rebellious clouds, under foul and murky skies; sometimes the subjects seemed to have been taken from the nightmarish dreams of science, and hark back to prehistoric times; monstrous flora bloomed on the rocks; everywhere, in among the erratic blocks and glacial mud, were figures whose simian appearance—heavy jawbone, protruding brows, receding forehead, and flattened skull top—recalled the ancestral head, the head of the first Quaternary Period, the head of man when he was still fructivorous and without speech, the contemporary of the mammoth, of the rhinoceros with septate nostrils, and of the giant bear. These drawings defied classification; unheeding, for the most part, of the limitations of painting, they ushered in a very special type of the fantastic, one born of sickness and delirium.

The art historian Michael Gibson says that Redon began to want his works, even the ones darker in colour and subject matter, to portray "the triumph of light over darkness."

Redon described his work as ambiguous and undefinable:

My drawings inspire, and are not to be defined. They place us, as does music, in the ambiguous realm of the undetermined.

== Legacy ==
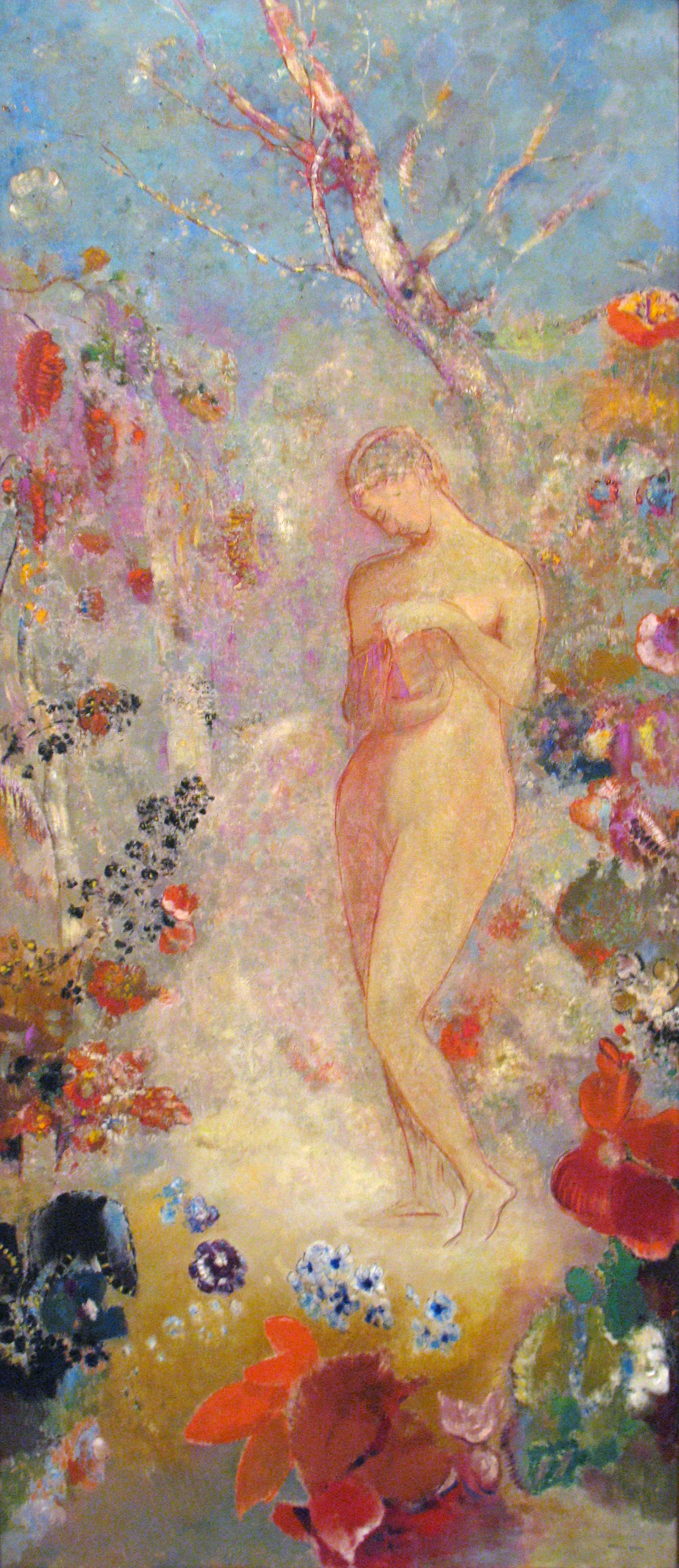
Pandora, 1914

In 1903, Redon was awarded the Legion of Honour. His popularity increased when a catalogue of etchings and lithographs was published by André Mellerio in 1913; that same year, he was given the largest single representation at the groundbreaking US International Exhibition of Modern Art (aka Armory Show), in New York City, Chicago and Boston.

His choice of color and subject matter in the second part of his career led to Redon being considered a precursor to Dadaism and Surrealism. According to Surrealist André Masson, Redon's use of bright colors in his flower pastels, as well as his choice of depicting uncommon or imaginary species renders his works "released from stylized naturalism", thus demonstrating the "endless possibilities of lyrical chromatics".

In 1923, Mellerio published Odilon Redon: Peintre Dessinateur et Graveur. An archive of Mellerio's papers is held by the Ryerson & Burnham Libraries at the Art Institute of Chicago.

Redon was the inspiration for Guy Maddin's 1995 short film Odilon Redon, or The Eye Like a Strange Balloon Mounts Toward Infinity.

=== Modern exhibitions ===
In 2005, the Museum of Modern Art launched an exhibition entitled "Beyond The Visible", a comprehensive overview of Redon's work showcasing more than 100 paintings, drawings, prints and books from The Ian Woodner Family Collection. The exhibition ran from 30 October 2005 to 23 January 2006.

In 2007, the Schirn Kunsthalle Frankfurt presented the exhibition "As in a Dream" with a survey of Redon's work with more than 200 drawings, lithographs, pastels, and paintings.

The Grand Palais in Paris, France featured a vast exhibition of Redon's art from March to June 2011

The Fondation Beyeler in Basel, Switzerland showed a retrospective from February to May 2014.

The Kröller-Müller Museum in Otterlo, The Netherlands, had an exhibition with an emphasis on the role that literature and music played in Redon's life and work, under the title La littérature et la musique. The exhibition ran from 2 June to 9 September 2018.

The Getty Center is hosting "Odilon Redon: Otherworldly Visions" from July 14 through October 18, 2026, featuring the French Symbolist's transition from dark charcoal drawings to vibrant pastels. The exhibition includes major works like "The Battle of the Bones" and "Baronne de Domecy," with free, timed-entry tickets required for entry.

From 23 September 2026 to 14 March 2027, the Fondation Louis Vuitton exhibited Présence et Résonance: Hors Les Murs. The exhibit displayed three murals by Redon on loan from the Abbaye de Fontfroide and is shown in conjunction with the Fondation’s exhibit Gustave Fayet, Collector – Creator. When removing the murals from the walls for the first time since their installation “a set of test drawings, until then unknown, by Redon were uncovered.”

== Gallery ==
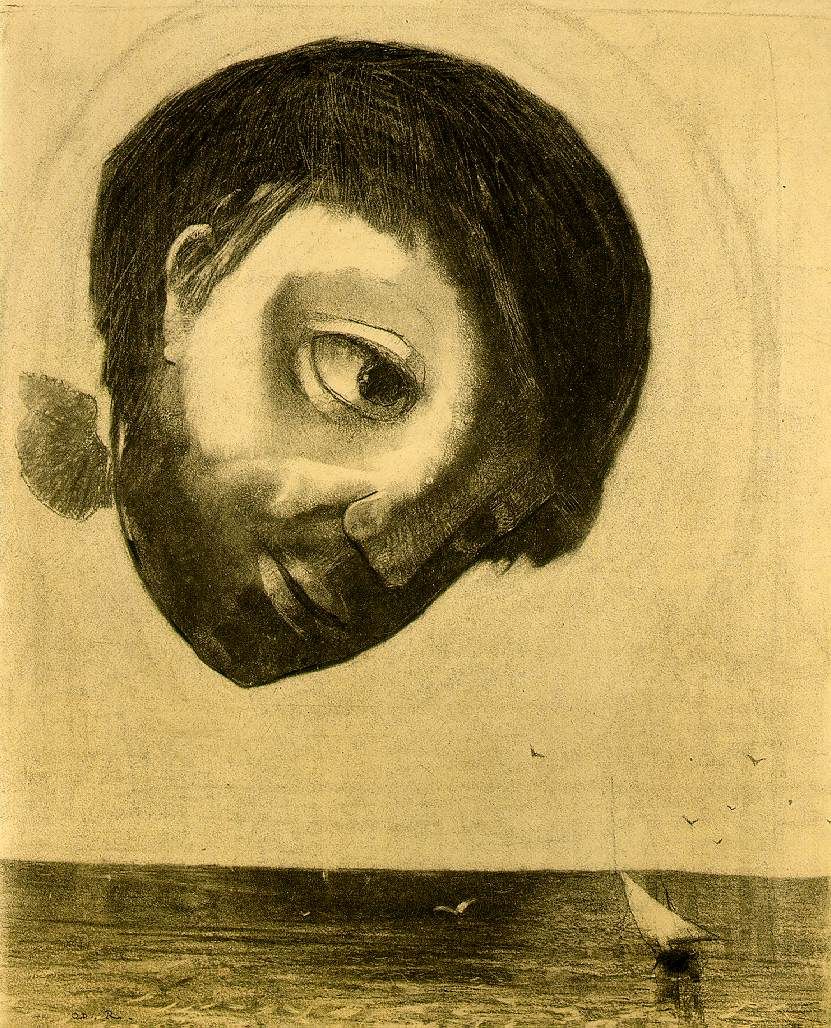
Guardian Spirit of the Waters, 1878 (Art Institute of Chicago)

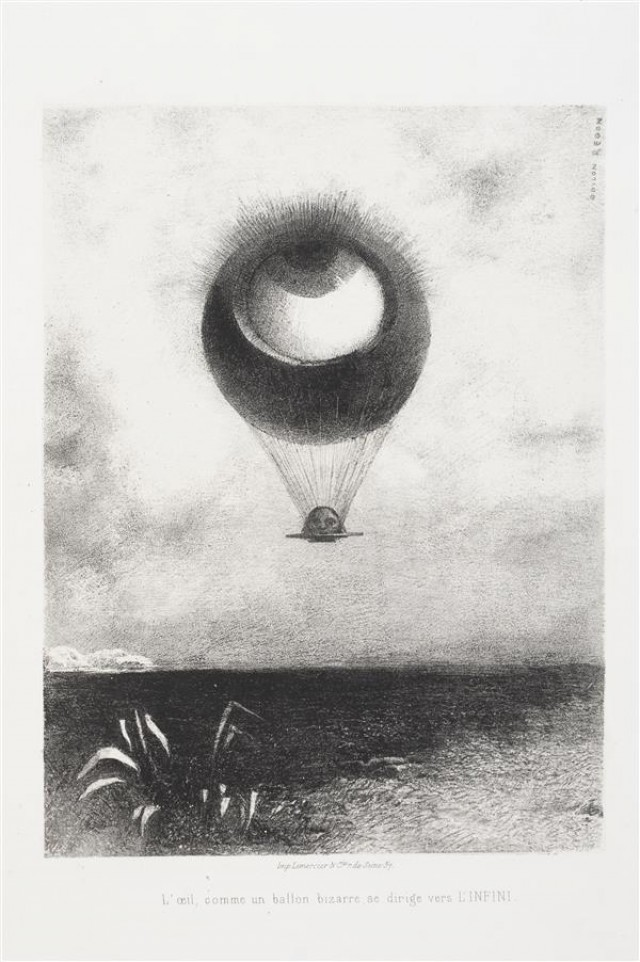
The Eye Like a Weird Balloon, Goes to Infinity, 1882 (From series To Edgar Poe (À Edgar Poe) (Los Angeles County Museum of Art)

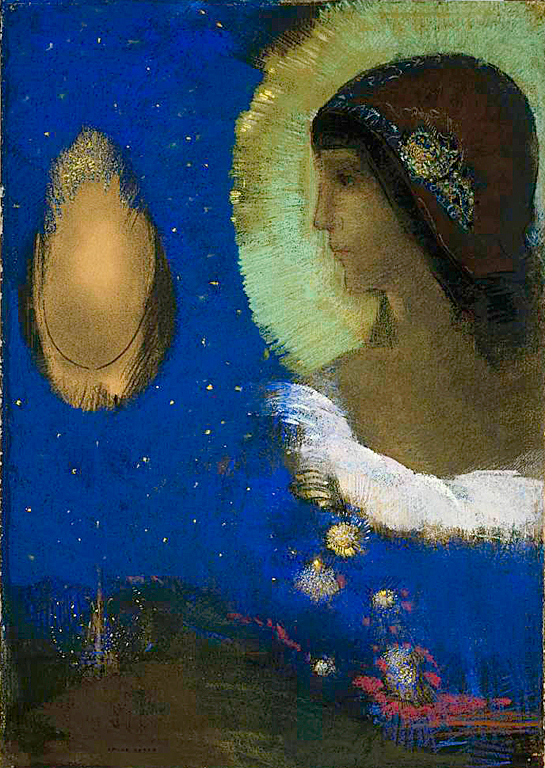
Sita, c. 1893, pastel (Art Institute of Chicago)

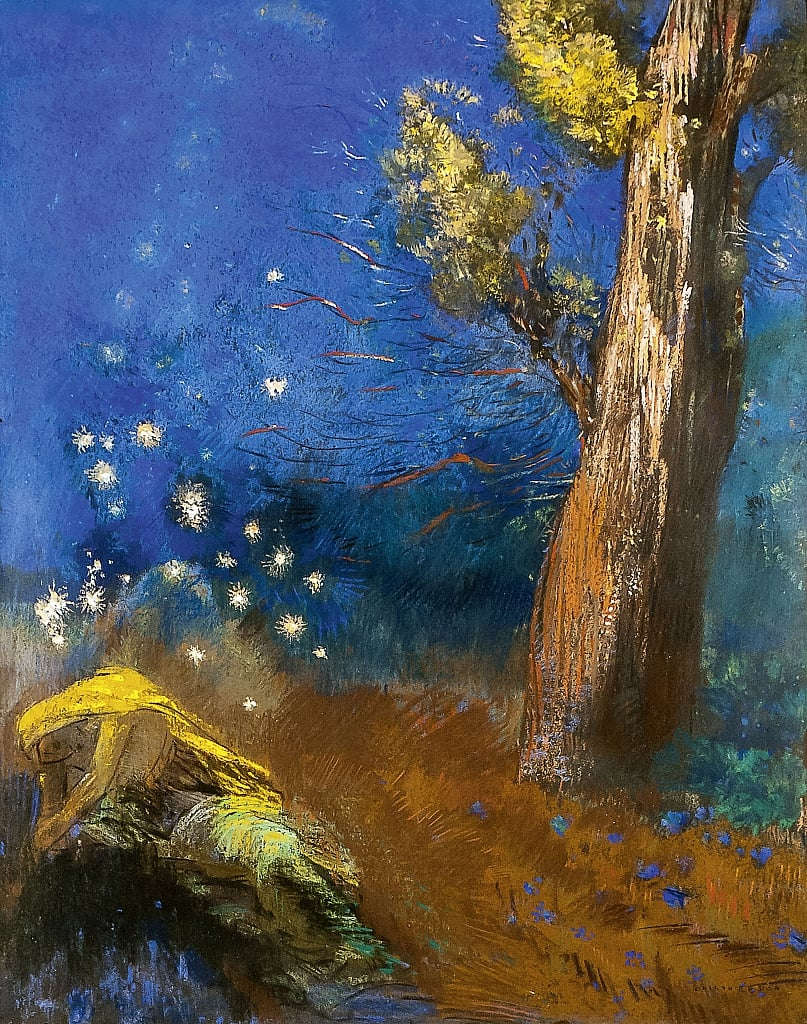
The Death of Buddha, c. 1899 (private collection)

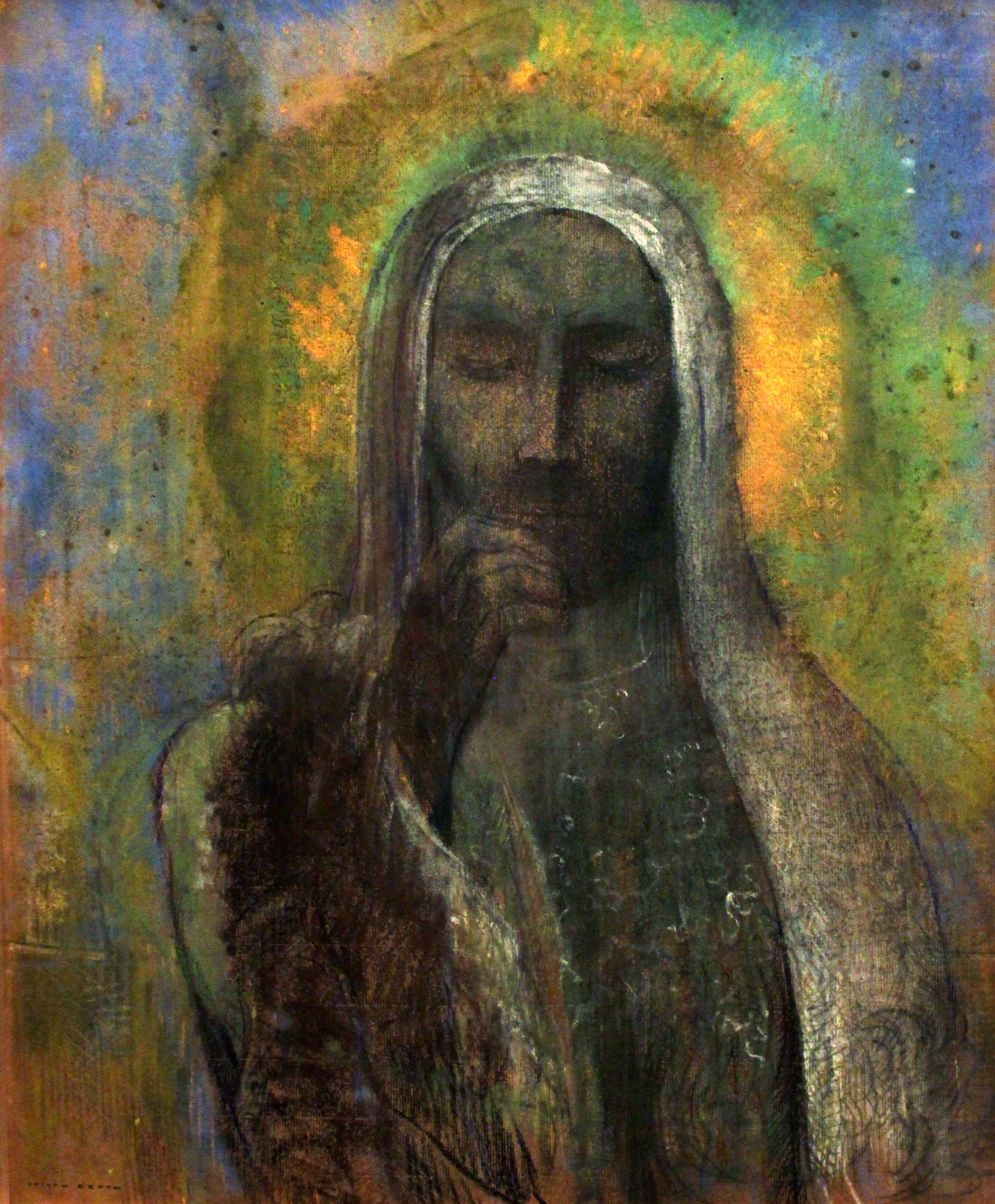
The Christ of Silence, Petit Palais

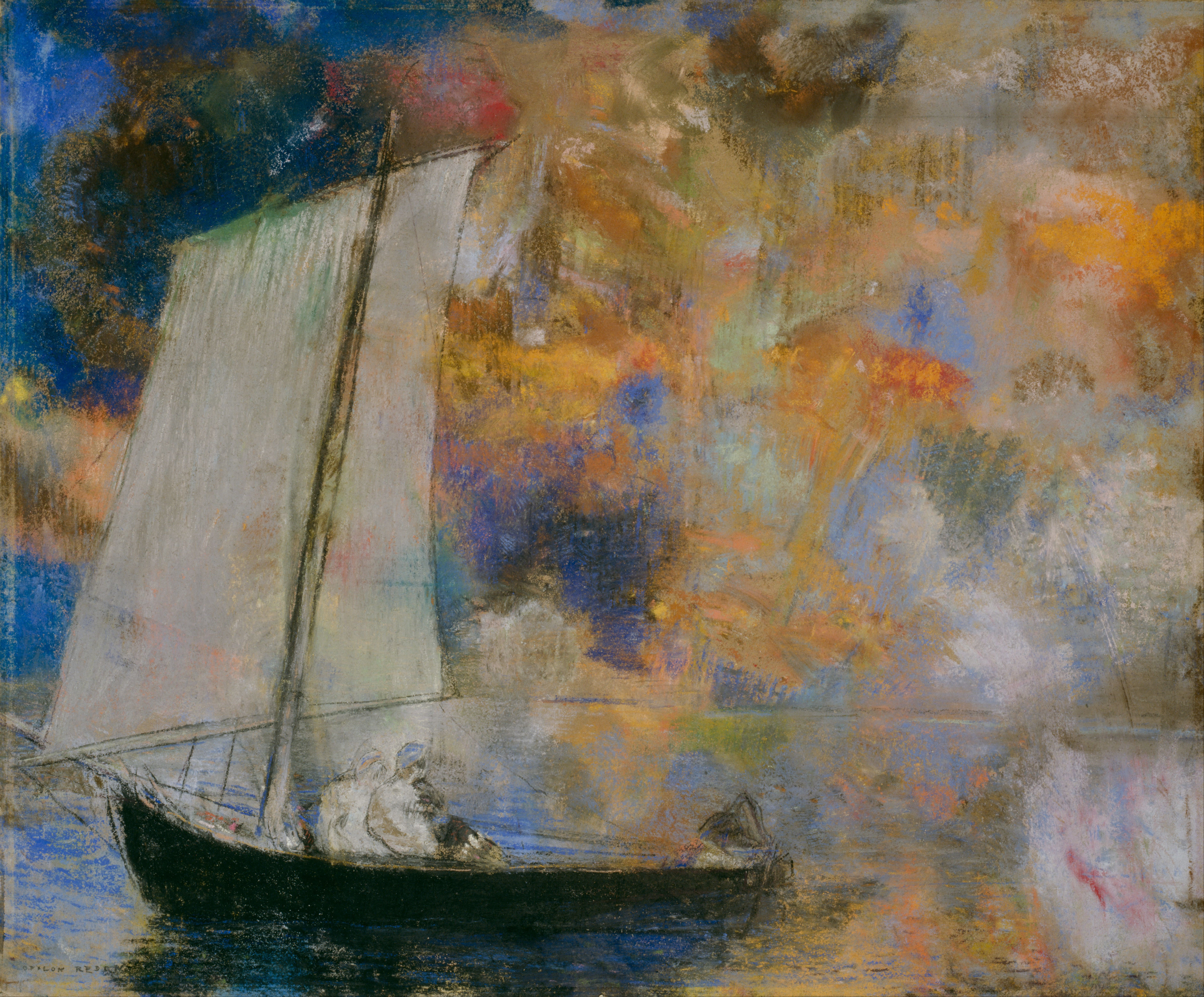
Flower Clouds, 1903 (Art Institute of Chicago)

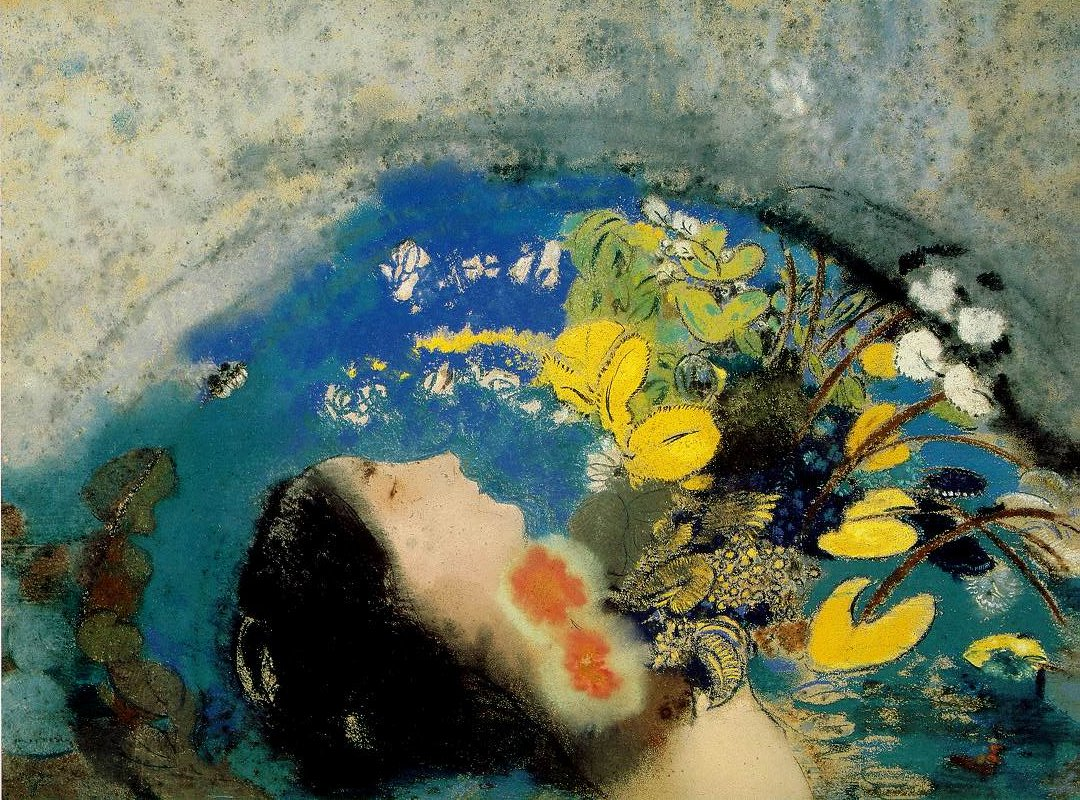
Ophelia, 1900–1905 (Dian Woodner Collection)

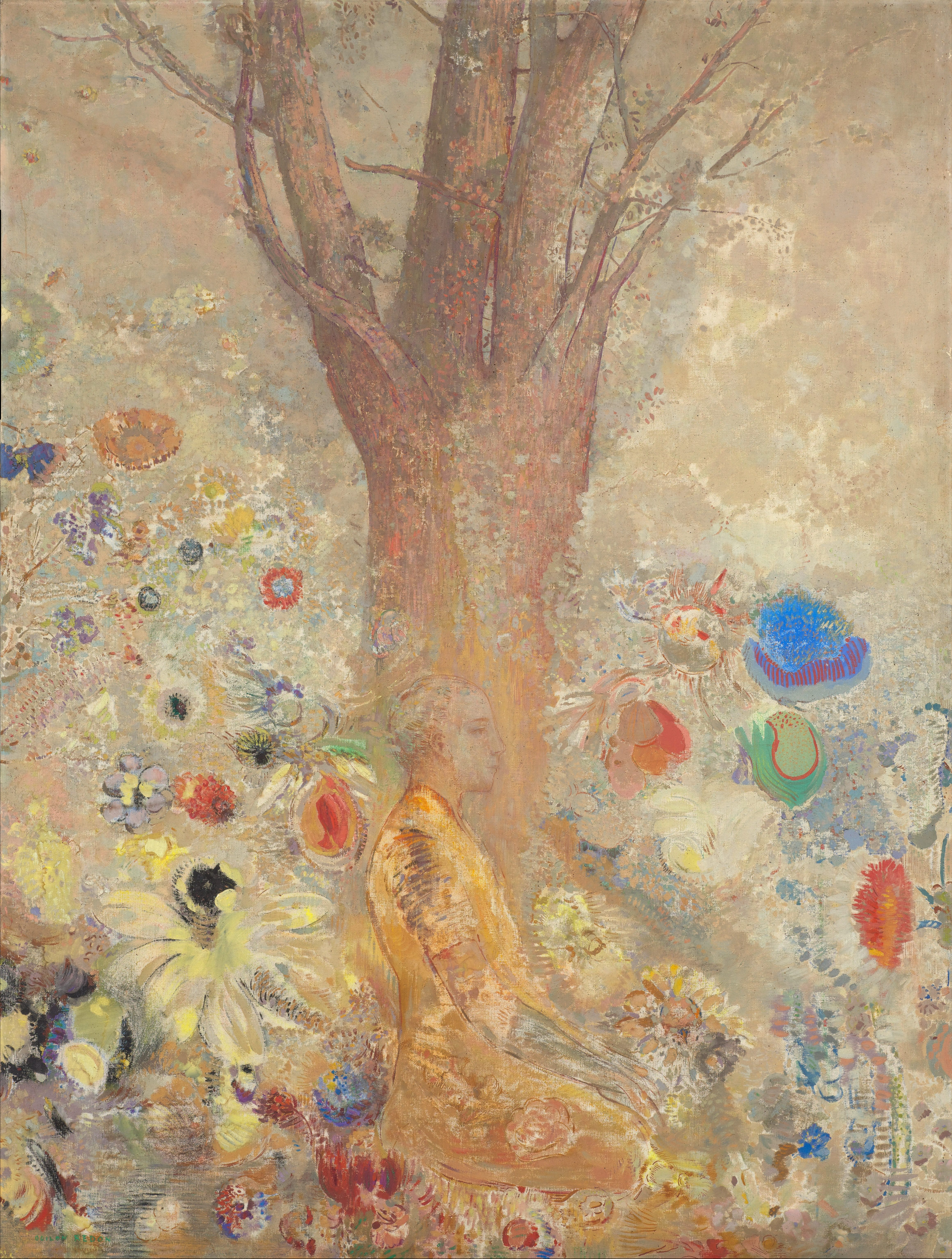
The Buddha, 1904 (Van Gogh Museum)

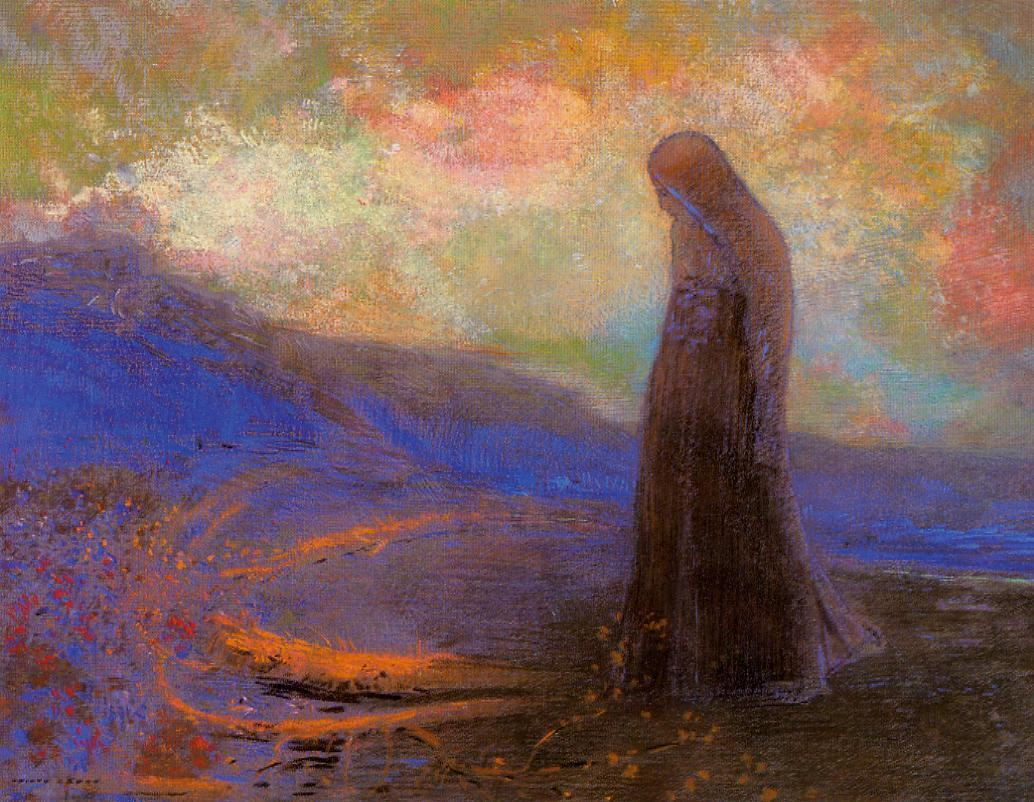
Reflection, 1900–1905 (private collection)

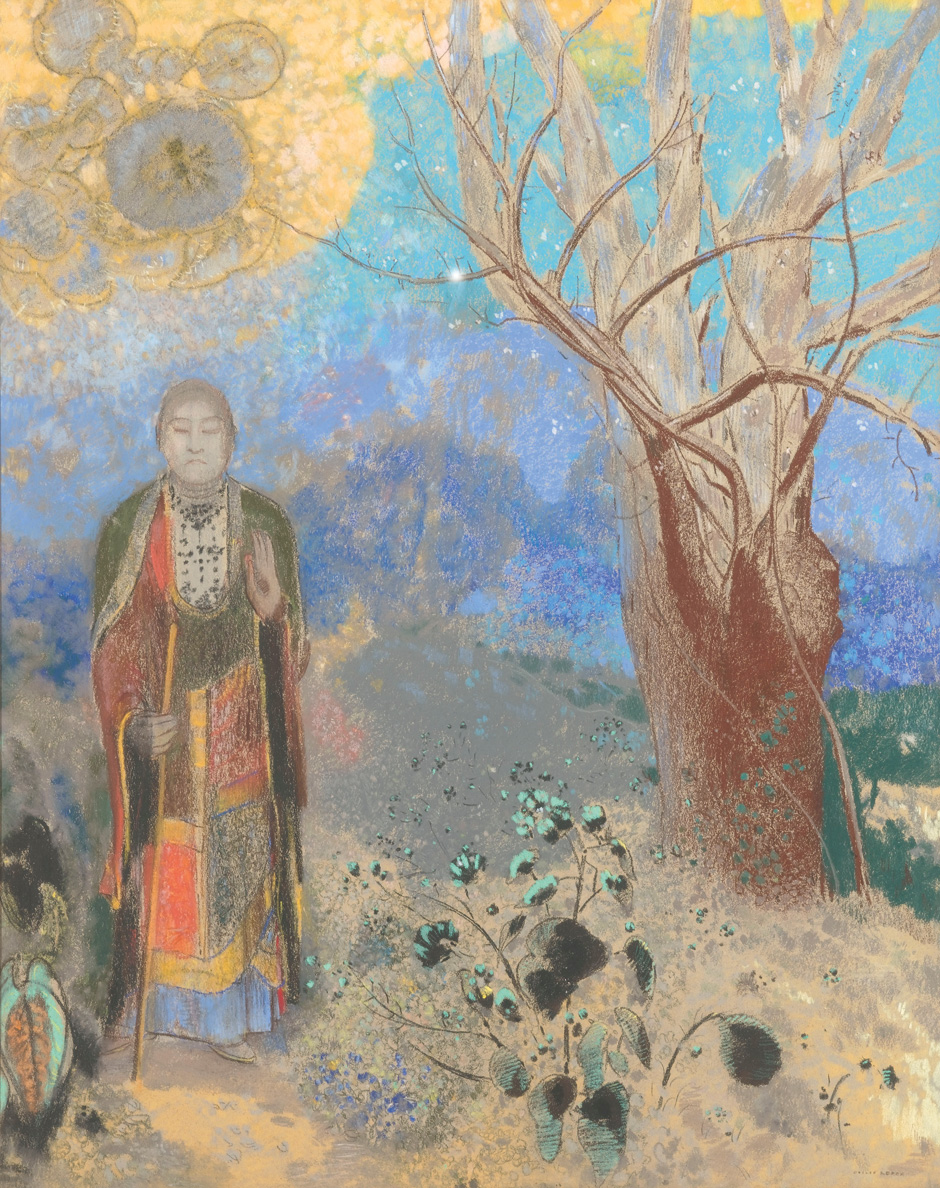
The Buddha, c. 1904-1907 (Musée d'Orsay)

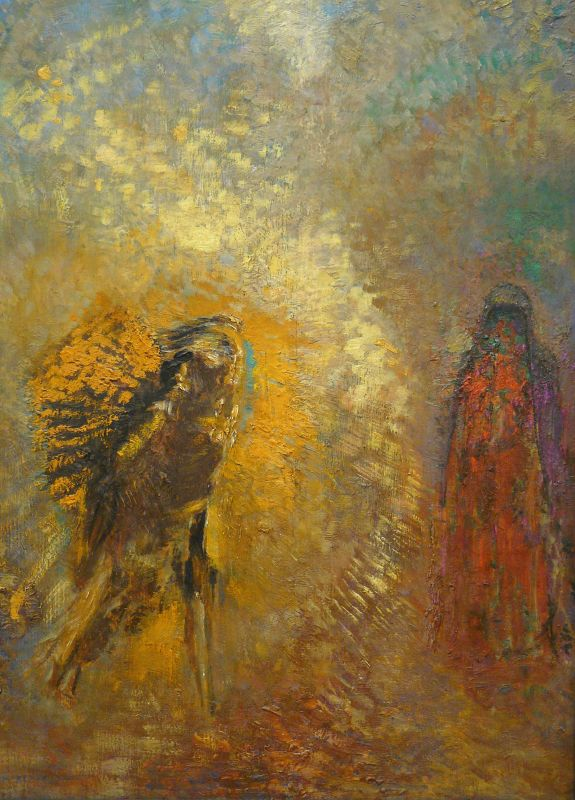
Apparition, 1905 (Museum of Modern Art)

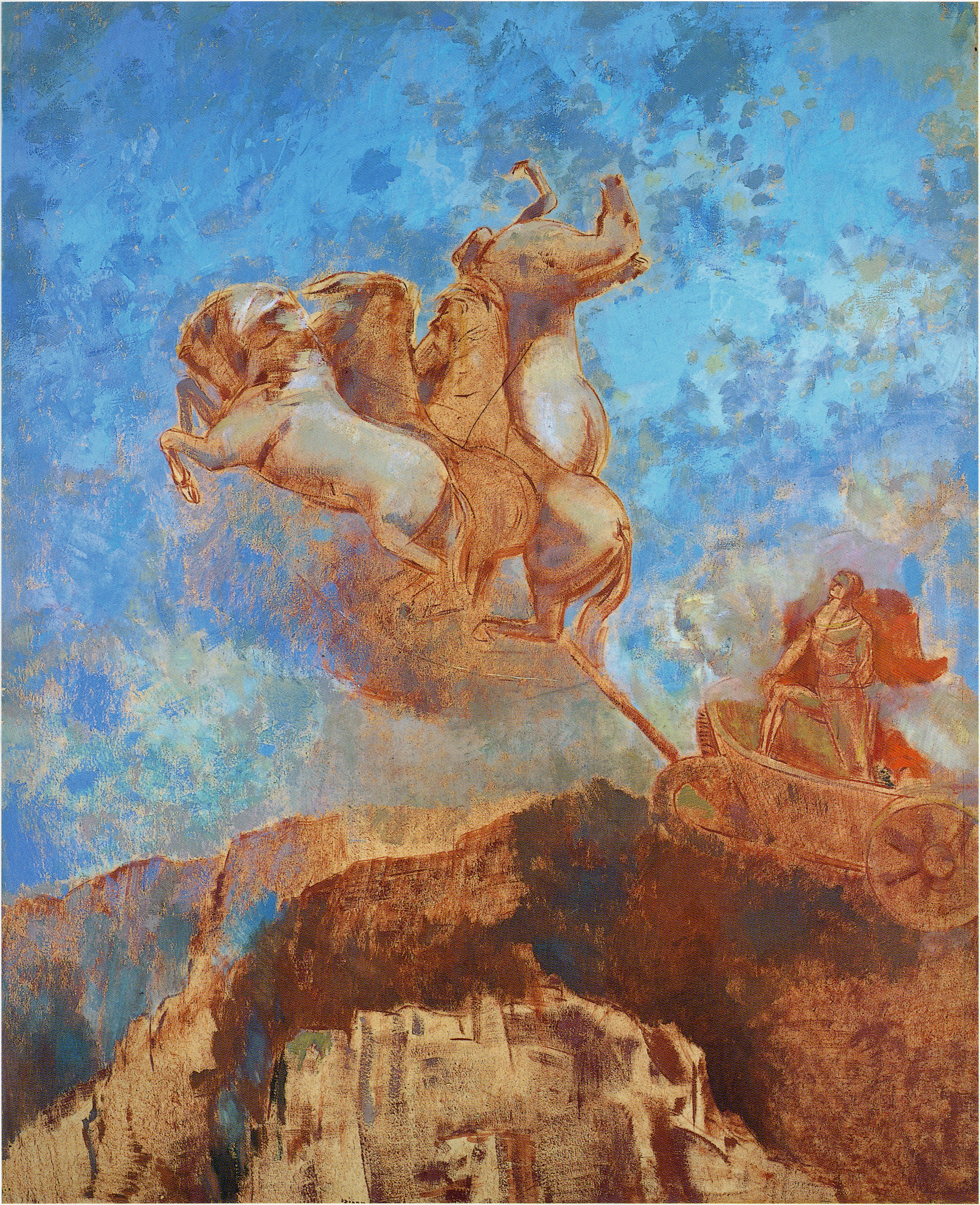
The Chariot of Apollo, 1909 (Musée des Beaux-Arts de Bordeaux)

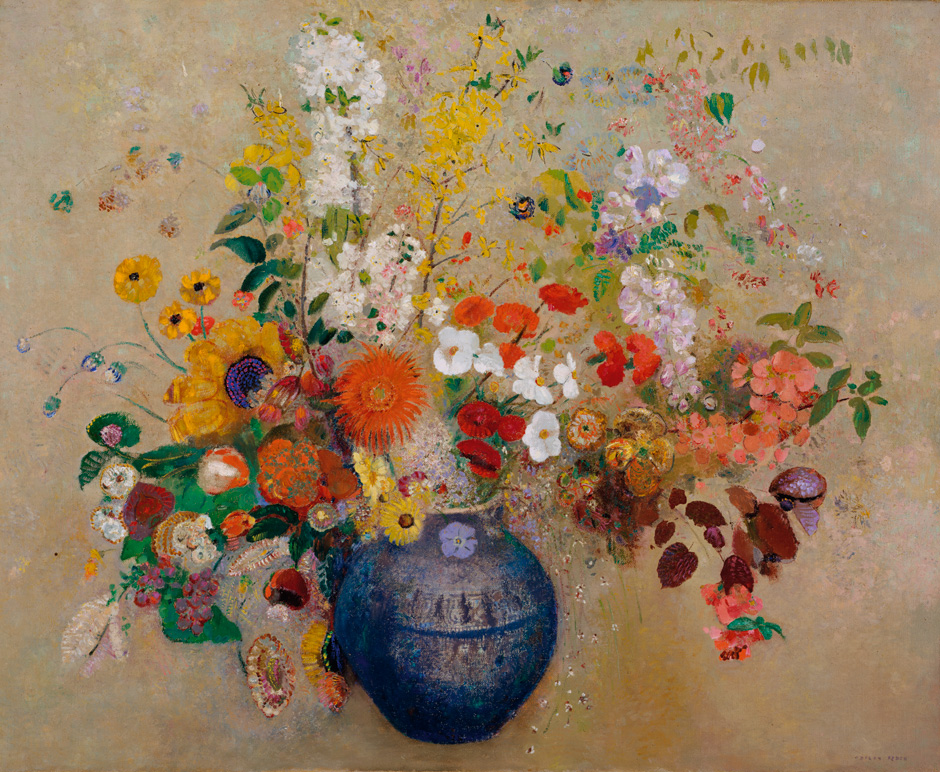
Flowers, 1909

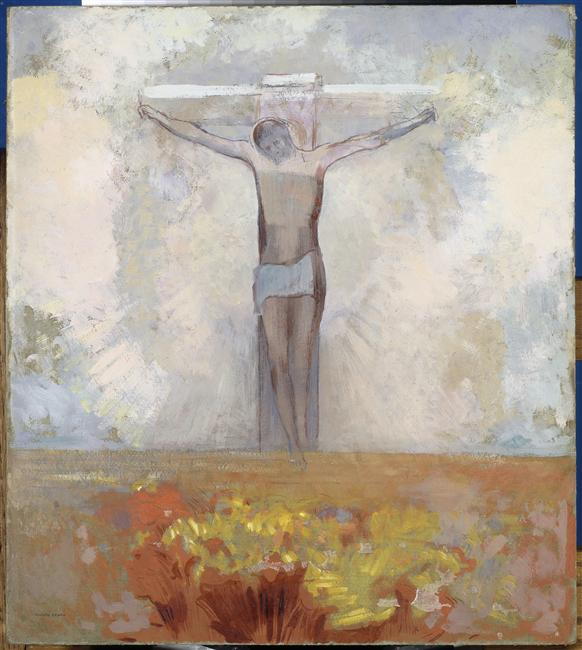
Christ on the Cross, 1910

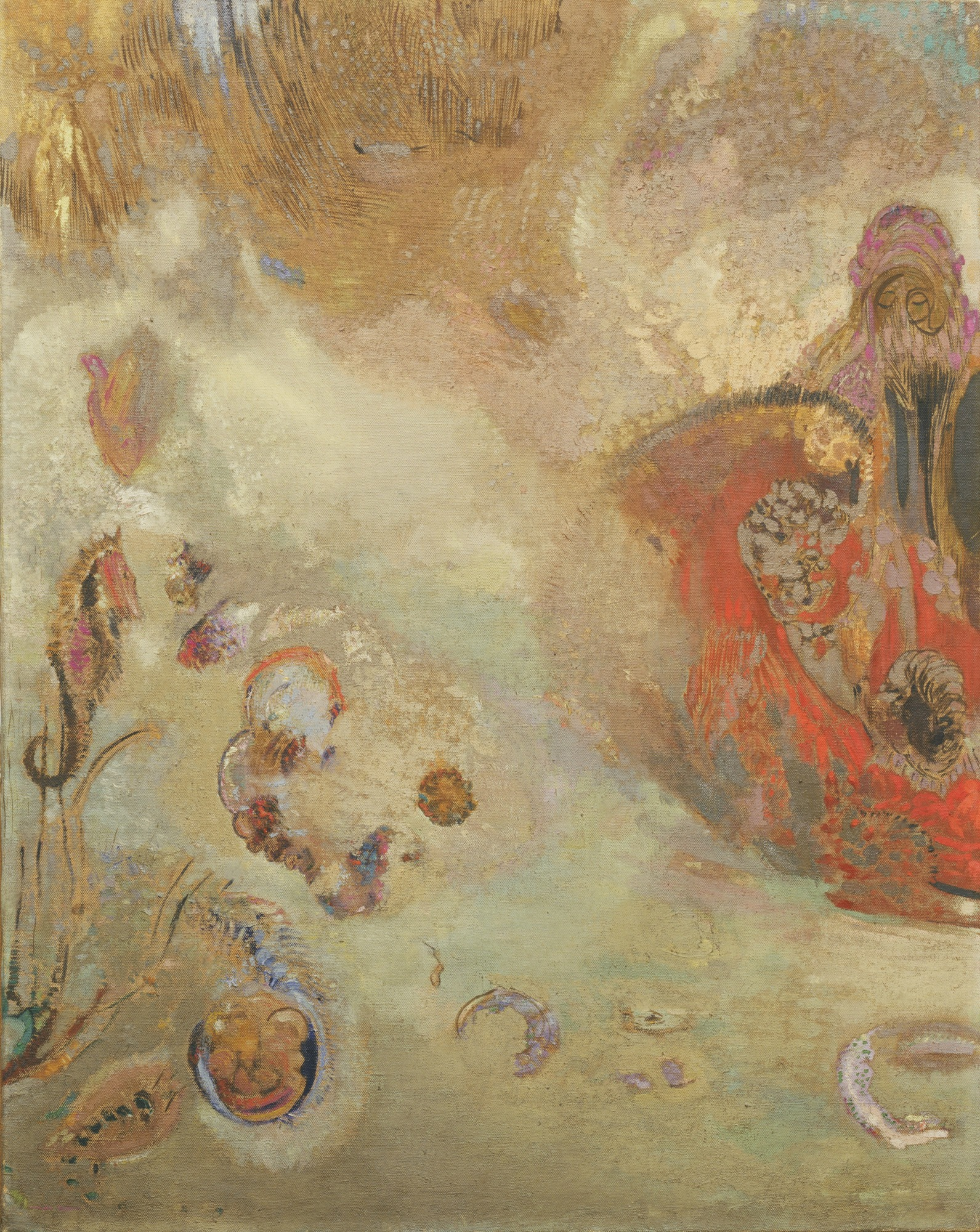
Underwater Vision, c. 1910 (Museum of Modern Art)

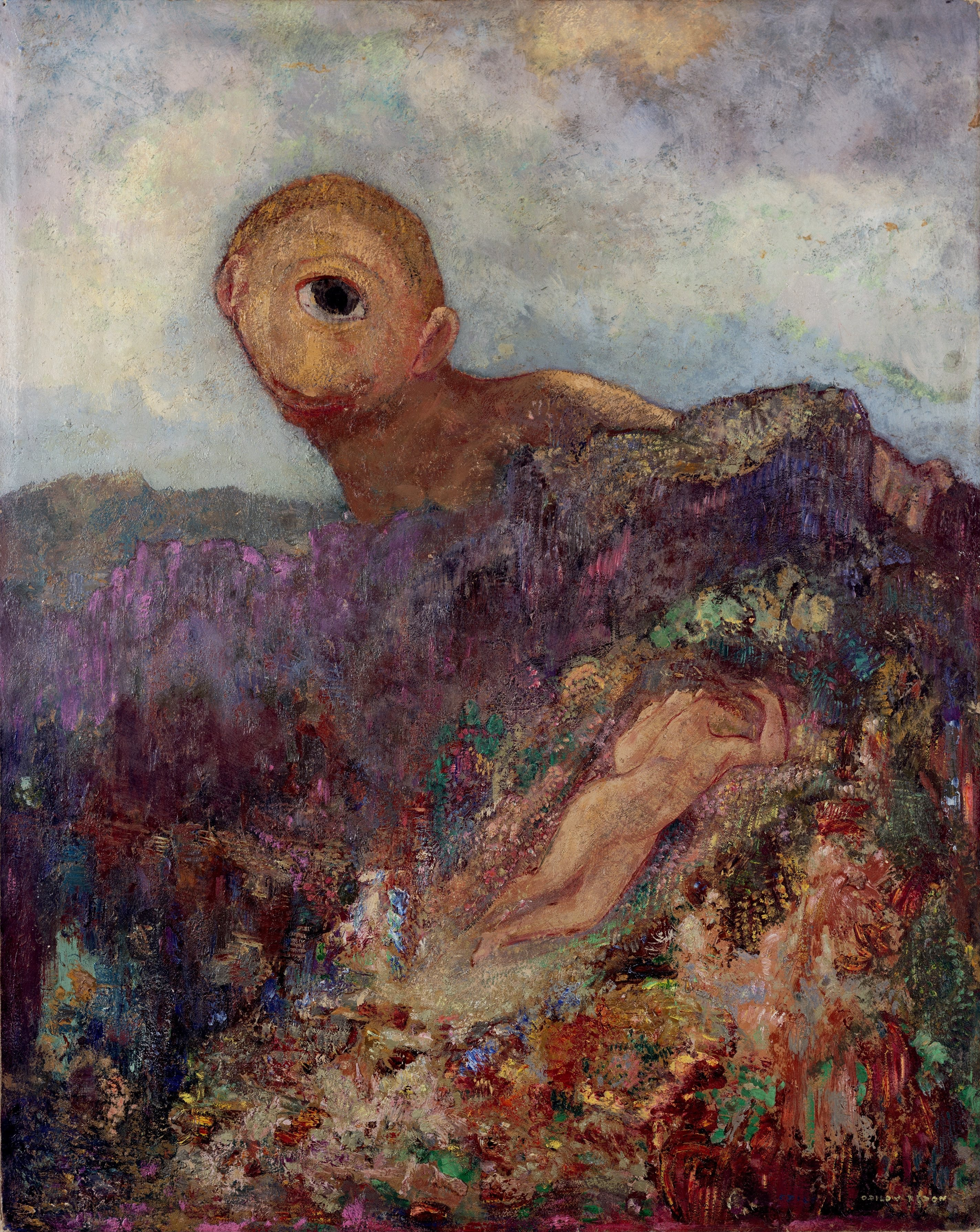
The Cyclops, 1914 (Kröller-Müller Museum)

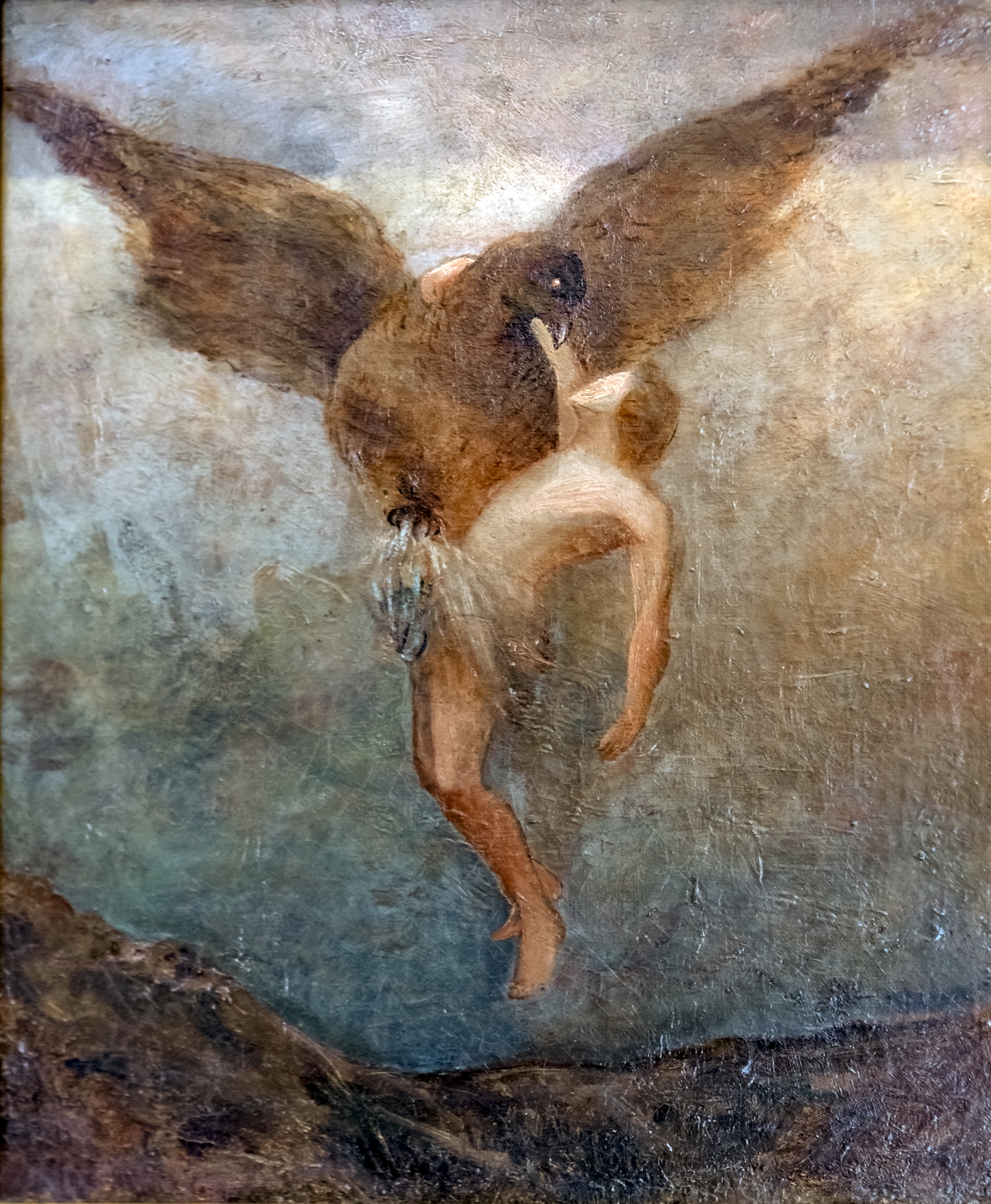
The Abduction of Ganymede (Bemberg Foundation)

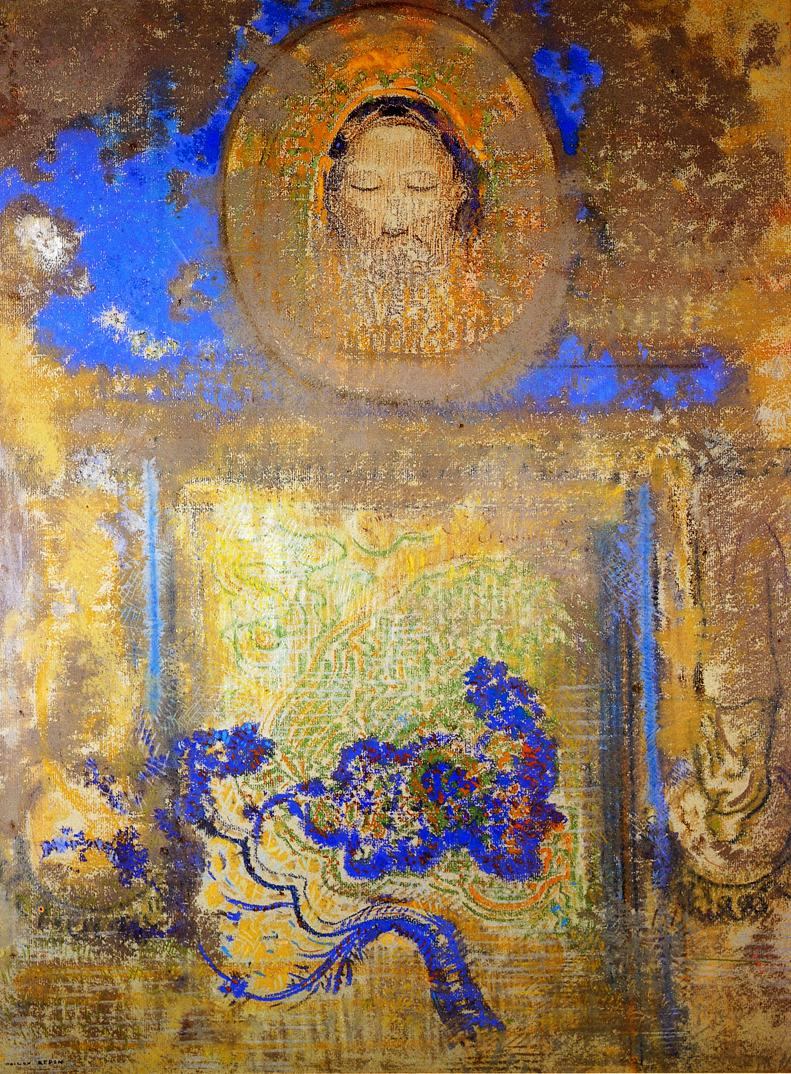
Evocation, undated (private collection)

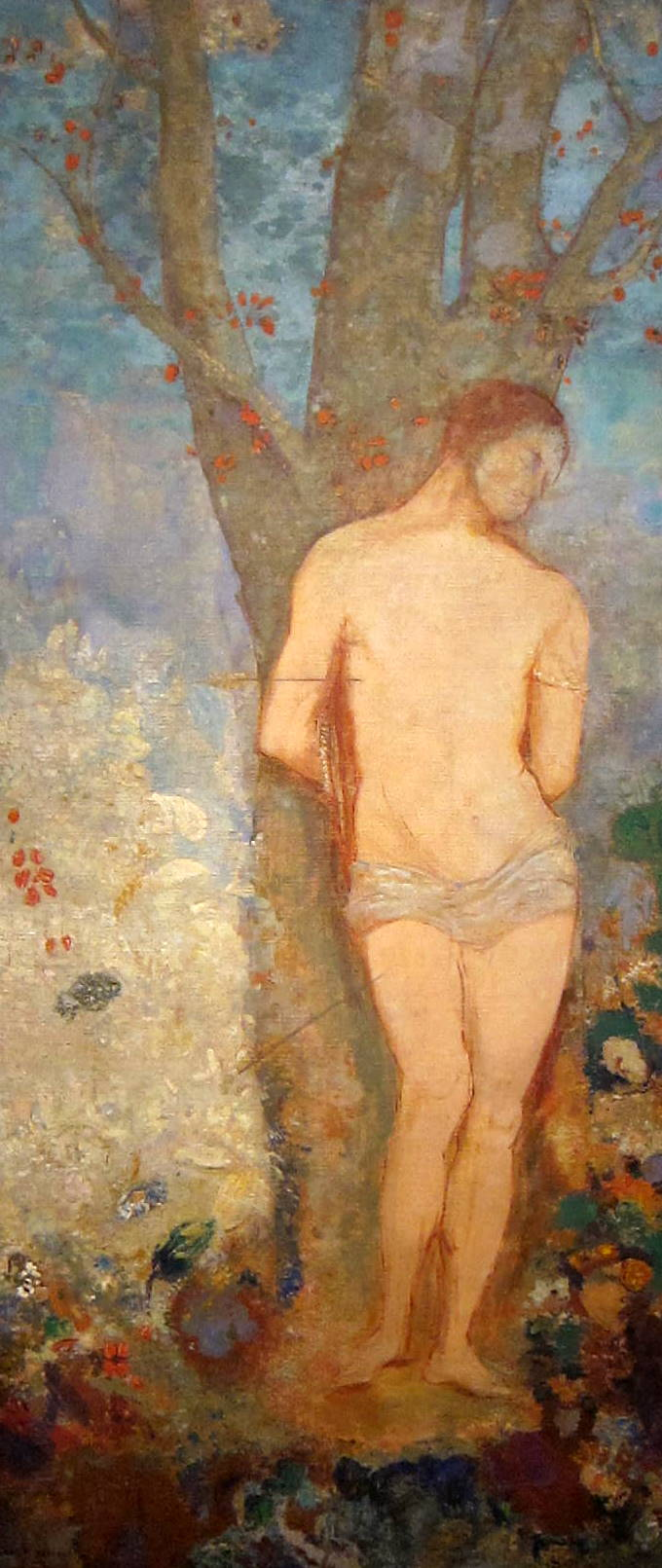
Saint Sebastian, 1910-1912

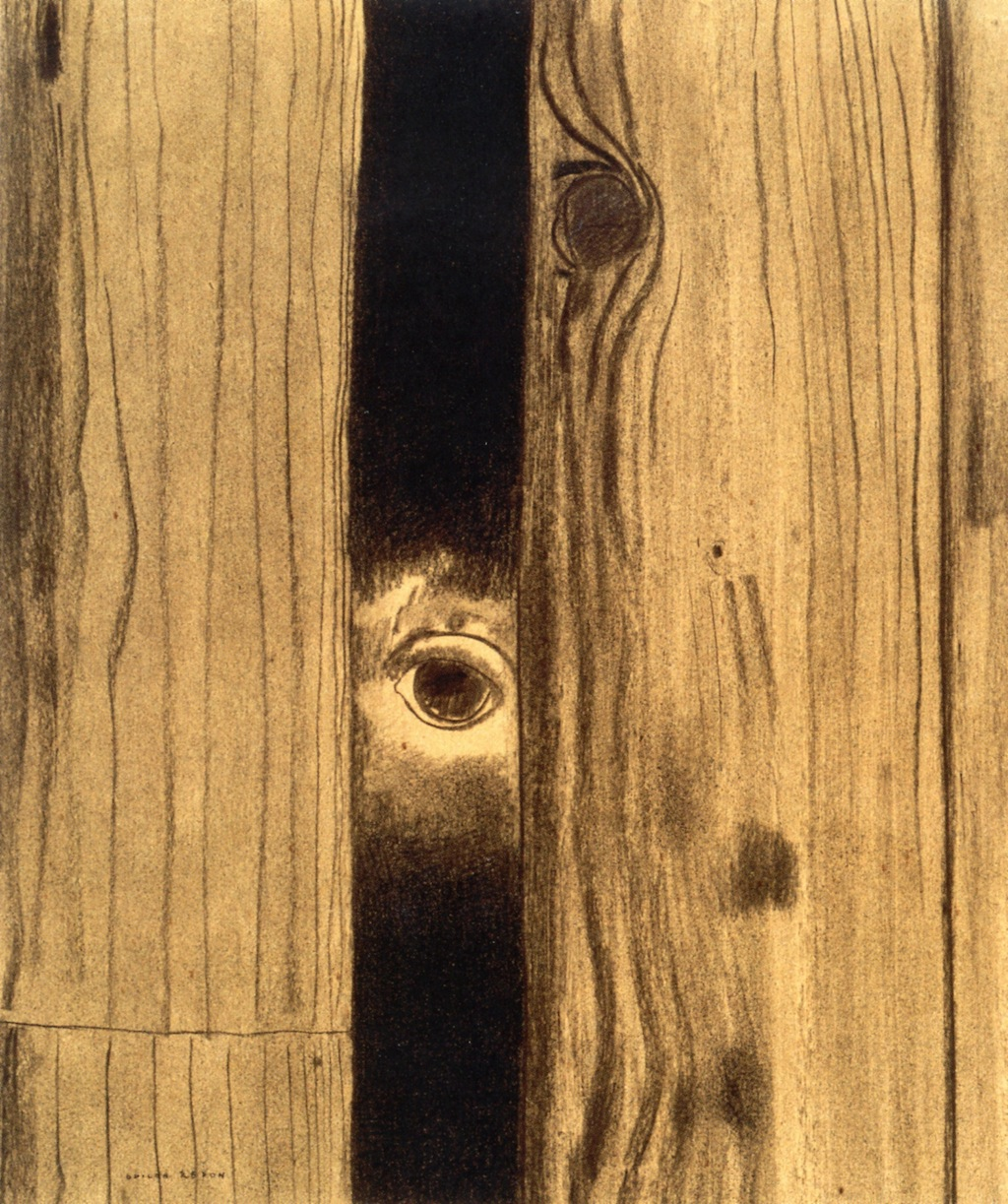
The Tell-Tale Heart, 1883

== Bibliography ==
- Russell T. Clement, Four French Symbolists: A Sourcebook on Pierre Puvis de Chavannes, Gustave Moreau, Odilon Redon, and Maurice Denis, Greenwood Press, 1996, ISBN 0-313-29752-5 & ISBN 978-0-313-29752-6
- Jodi Hauptman and Marina Van Zuylen, Beyond the Visible: The Art of Odilon Redon, 2005, ISBN 0-87070-702-7 & ISBN 978-0-87070-702-5
- Andre Mellerio, Odilon Redon, 1968, ASIN B0007DNIKO
- Odilon Redon and Alfred Werner, The Graphic Works of Odilon Redon, Dover, 1969, ISBN 0-486-21996-8
- Odilon Redon and Alfred Werner, The Graphic Works of Odilon Redon, (Dover Pictorial Archive), 2005, ISBN 0-486-44659-X & ISBN 978-0-486-44659-2
- Margret Stuffmann, Odilon Redon: As in a Dream, 2007, ISBN 3-7757-1894-X & ISBN 978-3-7757-1894-3
