= Andrea Woodner =

American architect

- Education: Bennington College; Harvard University; Columbia University

Andrea Woodner is an American artist, architect, and philanthropist. She is the founder of the New York City-based Design Trust for Public Space, a nonprofit organization which "brings together government agencies, community groups, and private-sector experts to transform and evolve the city's landscape."

== Early life ==
Andrea Woodner is the daughter of Ruth Lyon and Ian Woodner. She has two siblings, Dian and Jonathan Woodner.

Woodner was raised in New York City and loved art from an early age, often visiting the Frick Collection during her teenage years. She earned a BA with a concentration in ceramics and sculpture from Bennington College in the class of 1970. Later, she took classes at the Harvard University Graduate School of Design, then earned a master's in architecture from the Columbia University Graduate School of Architecture, Planning, and Preservation.

== Career ==
In 1995, Woodner founded the nonprofit organization Design Trust for Public Space to connect design thought and incubation to the public good of New York City. She chaired the organization's board of directors until January 2016, when she was succeeded by Eric Rothman. She continues to be active in fundraising for Design Trust.

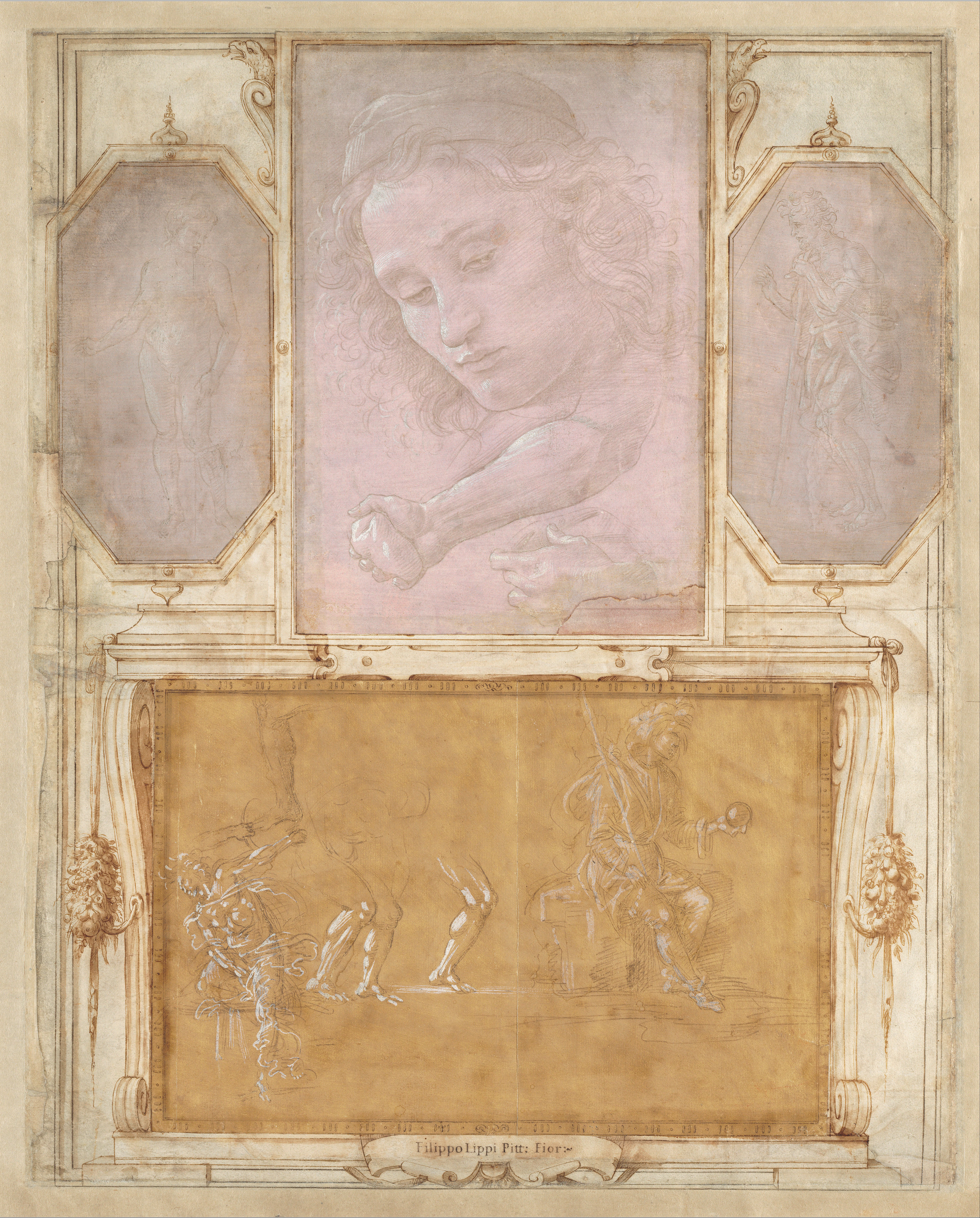
Girgio Vasari drawing, purchased by the National Gallery of Art from the Woodner sisters in 1991

Upon their father's death in November 1990, Andrea and Dian Woodner inherited the Ian Woodner Family Collection. In 1991, the Woodner sisters variously sold and donated 143 works of art from his collection to the National Gallery of Art in Washington, DC, including drawings by Albrecht Dürer, Benvenuto Cellini, and Giorgio Vasari. In July 2000, the sisters donated nearly 100 works of art by Odilon Redon to the Museum of Modern Art, including paintings, pastels, watercolors, drawings, prints and illustrated books.

Woodner's art has been exhibited at the Palmer Gallery of Vassar College. She has a long history of donations to the Morgan Library & Museum.
