= Byōbu =

Japanese folding screen

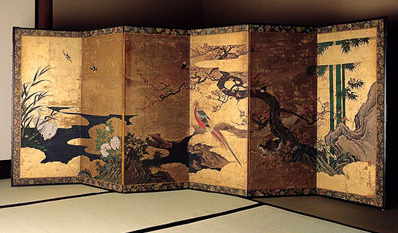
A six-panel byōbu from the 17th century

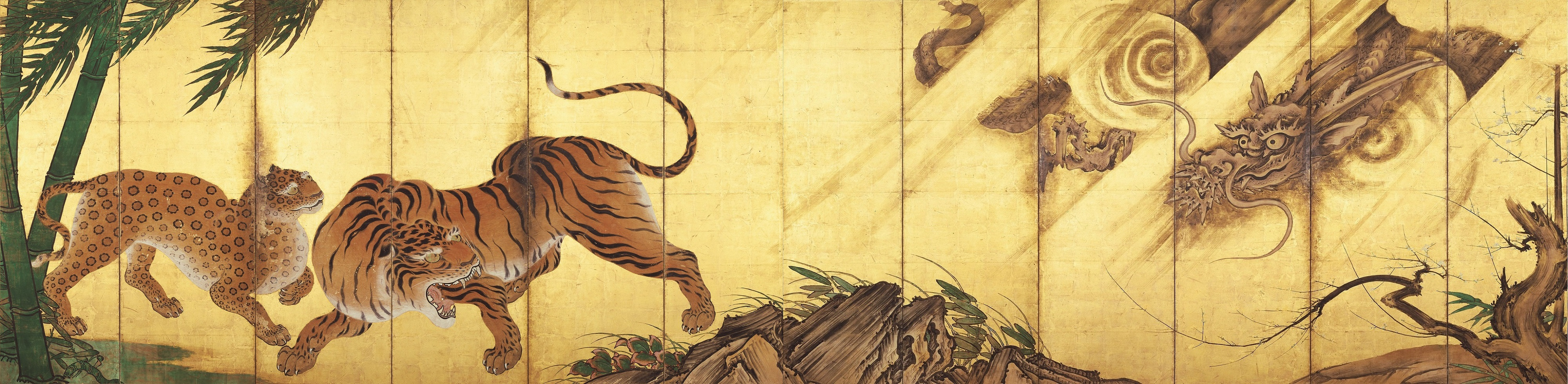
Pair of screens with a leopard, tiger and dragon by Kanō Sanraku, 17th century, each 1.78 m × 3.56 m (5.8 ft × 11.7 ft), displayed flat

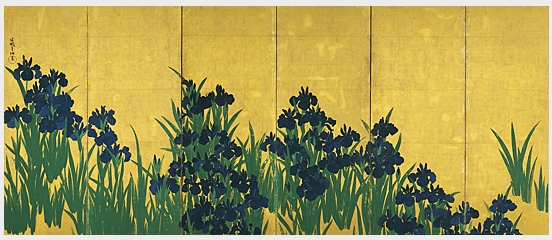
Left panel of Irises (燕子花図, kakitsubata-zu) by Ogata Kōrin, 1702

Left panel of the Shōrin-zu byōbu (松林図 屏風, Pine Trees screen) by Hasegawa Tōhaku, c. 1595

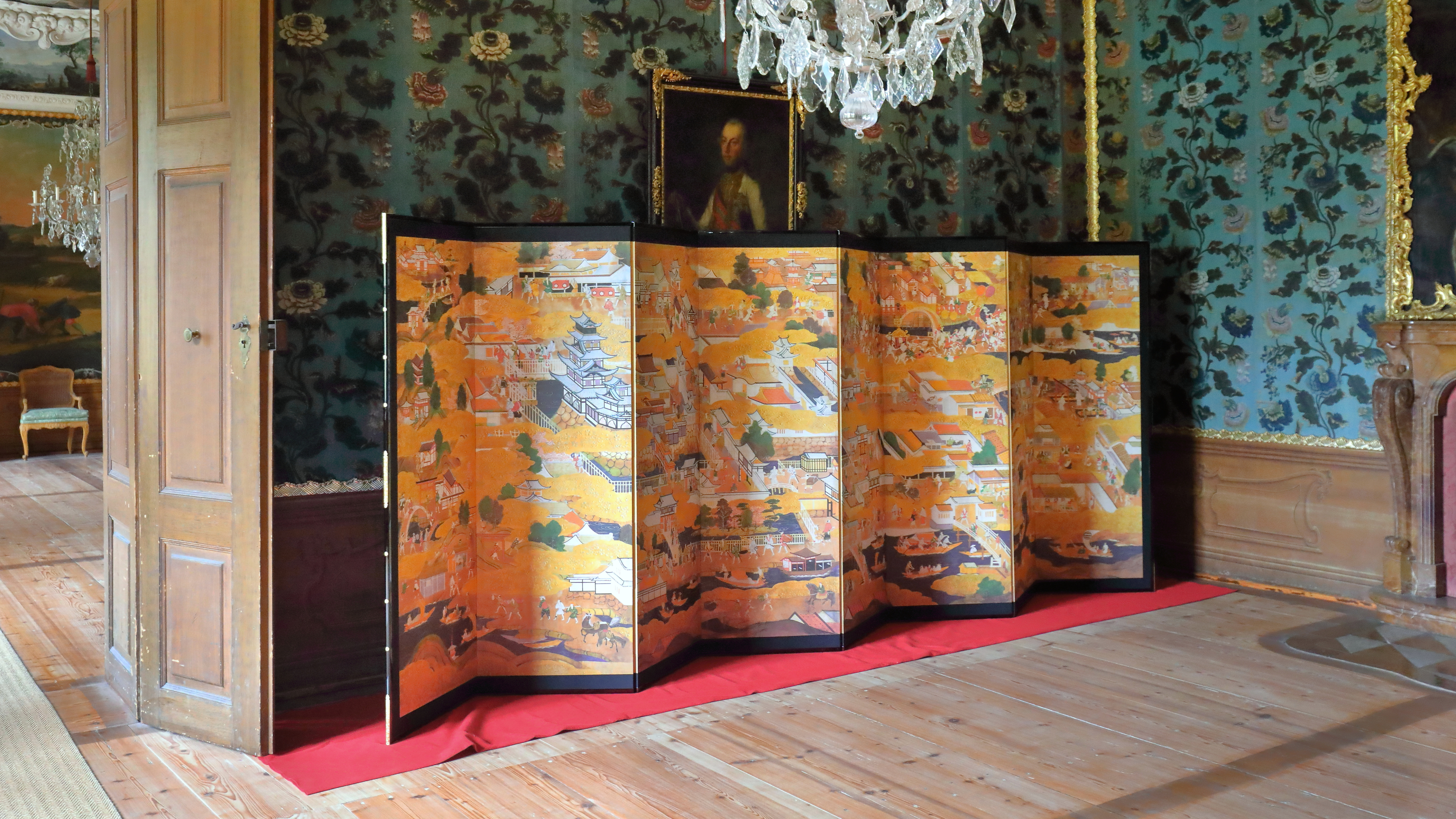
Byōbu depicting Osaka from the early 17th century in Eggenberg Castle in Graz

Byōbu (屏風, lit. 'wind wall') are Japanese folding screens made from several joined panels, bearing decorative painting and calligraphy, used to separate interiors and enclose private spaces, among other uses.

== History ==
Byōbu are originated in Han dynasty China and are thought to have been imported to Japan in the 7th or 8th century (Nara period). The oldest surviving byōbu produced in Japan, the torige ritsujo no byōbu (鳥毛立女屏風), produced in the 8th century, is kept in the Shōsōin Treasure Repository.

Nara-period byōbu retained their original form of a single, free-standing, legged panel. In the 8th century, multi-paneled byōbu made their appearance, and were used as furnishings in the imperial court, mainly in important ceremonies. Schools like Shoga, Kano, Tosa, Maruyama and Rimpa produced painted fusuma (cupboard door panel painting) over many generations for the decoration of private homes and castles. The six-paneled byōbu were the most common in the Nara period, and were covered in silk and connected with leather or silk cords. The painting on each panel was framed by a silk brocade, and the panel was bound with a wood frame.

By the Heian period (794–1185), particularly by the 9th century, byōbu were indispensable as furniture in the residences of daimyō, Buddhist temples, and shrines. Zenigata (銭形), coin-shaped metal hinges, were introduced and widely used to connect the panels instead of silk cords.

Following the Heian period and the independent development of Japan's culture separate from mainland Asian influences, the design of byōbu developed further from previously Chinese influences, and came to be used as furnishings in the architectural style of Shinden-zukuri.

During the Muromachi period (1392–1568), folding screens became more popular and were found in many residences, dojo, and shops. Two-panel byōbu were common, and overlapped paper hinges substituted for zenigata, which made them lighter to carry, easier to fold, and stronger at the joints. This technique allowed the depictions in the byōbu to be uninterrupted by panel vertical borders, which prompted artists to paint sumptuous, often monochromatic, nature-themed scenes and landscapes of famous Japanese locales.

The paper hinges, although quite strong, required that the panel infrastructure be as light as possible. Softwood lattices were constructed using special bamboo nails that allowed for the lattice to be planed along its edges to be straight, square, and the same size as the other panels of the byōbu. The lattices were coated with one or more layers of paper stretched across the lattice surface like a drum head to provide a flat and strong backing for the paintings that would be later mounted on the byōbu. The resulting structure was lightweight and durable, yet still quite delicate. After the paintings and brocade were attached, a lacquered wood frame (typically black or dark red) was applied to protect the outer perimeter of the byōbu, and intricately decorated metal hardware (strips, right angles, and studs) were applied to the frame to protect the lacquer.

In the following Azuchi–Momoyama period (1568–1600) and early Edo period (1600–1868), the popularity of byōbu grew, as interest and investment in arts and crafts developed significantly thanks to the patronage of the merchant classes. Byōbu adorned samurai residences, conveying high rank and demonstrating wealth and power. This led to radical changes in byōbu crafting, such as backgrounds made from gold leaf (金箔, kinpaku) and highly colorful paintings depicting nature and scenes from daily life, a style pioneered by the Kanō school.

In the modern day, byōbu are often machine-made; however, hand-crafted byōbu are still available, mainly produced by families that preserve the crafting traditions.

== Mexican biombo ==
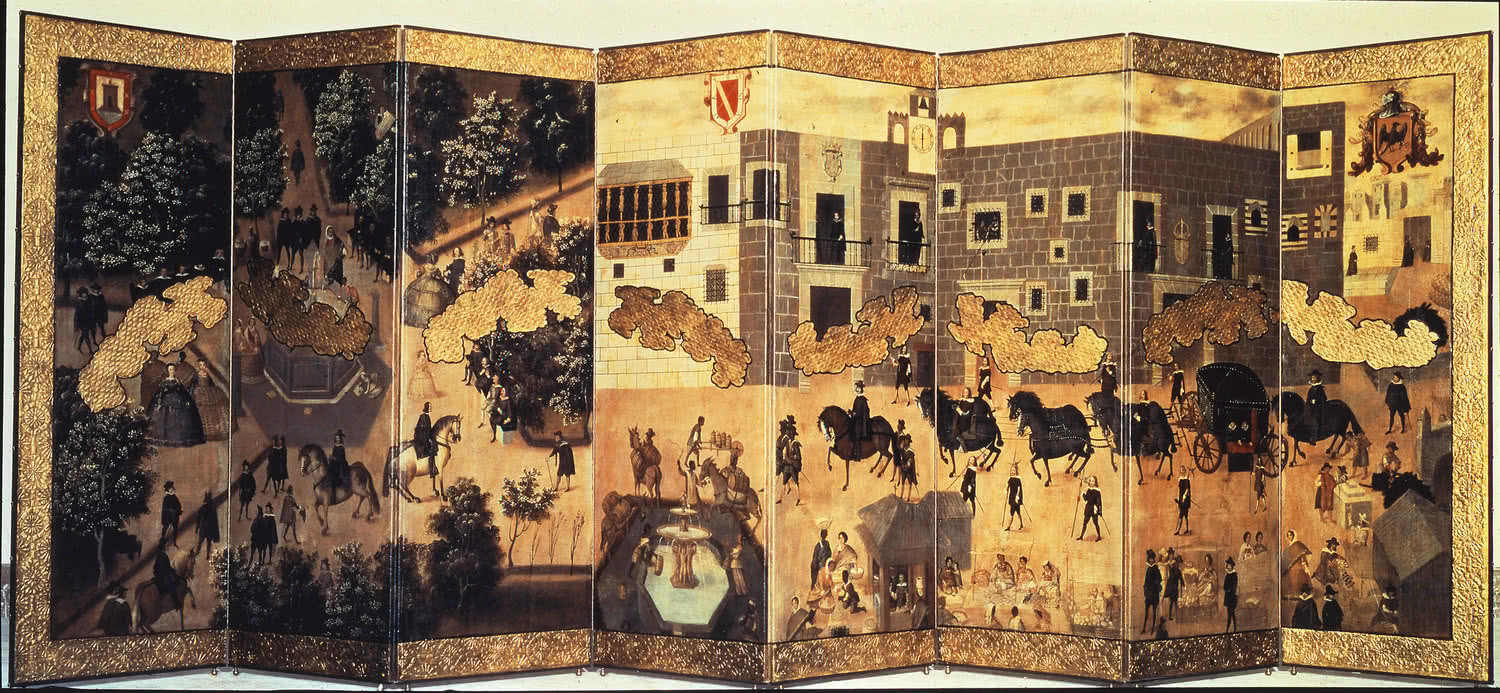
Biombo depicting the Alameda Central and the Palacio Virreinal, c. 1676–1700. There are gold clouds within the scene, an element borrowed from Japanese byōbu.

During the colonial-era of Mexico, the art of Mexico was influenced by Asian art, objects and artists introduced to the region via the Manilla Galleons. Notable among the influences were Japanese folding screens.

The word byōbu entered Mexican Spanish as biombo. The scenes depicted on these folding screens were frequently historical, such as the Conquest of Tenochtitlán. Others depicted everyday life, such as a folding screen depicting the happenings of the village of Ixtacalco.

== Japonism ==
Byōbu were a popular Japonism import item to Europe and America starting in the late 19th century. The French painter Odilon Redon created a series of panels for the Château de Domecy-sur-le-Vault in Burgundy, which were influenced by the art of byōbu.

== Contemporary byōbu artists ==
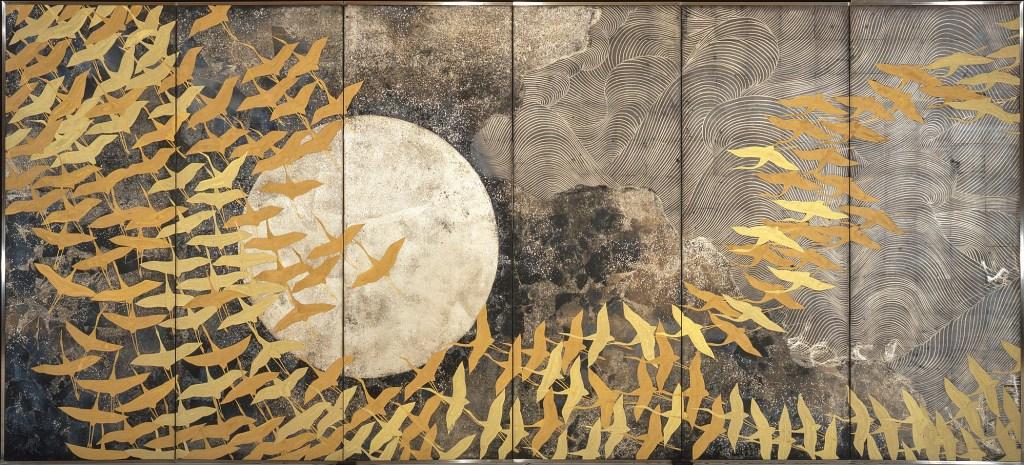
Kayama Matazō, A Thousand Cranes

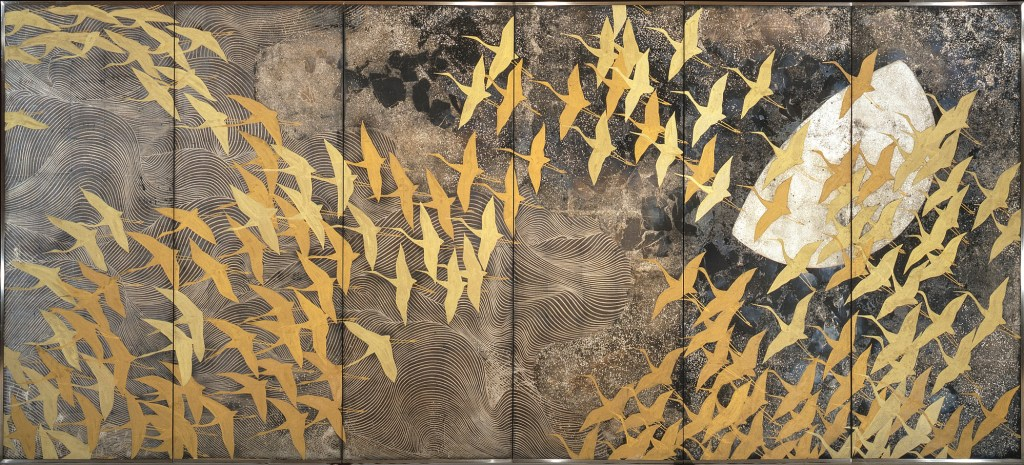
Kayama Matazō, A Thousand Cranes

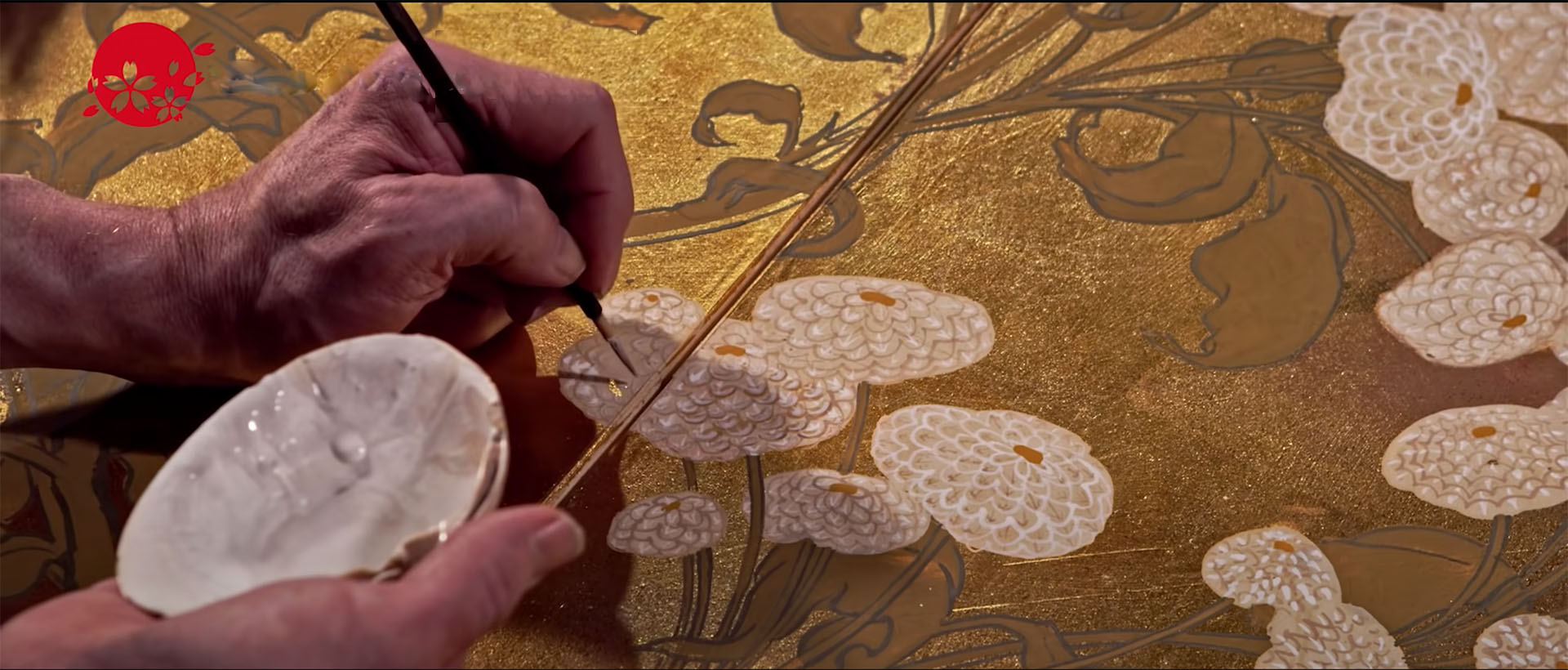
Painter Allan West in his studio

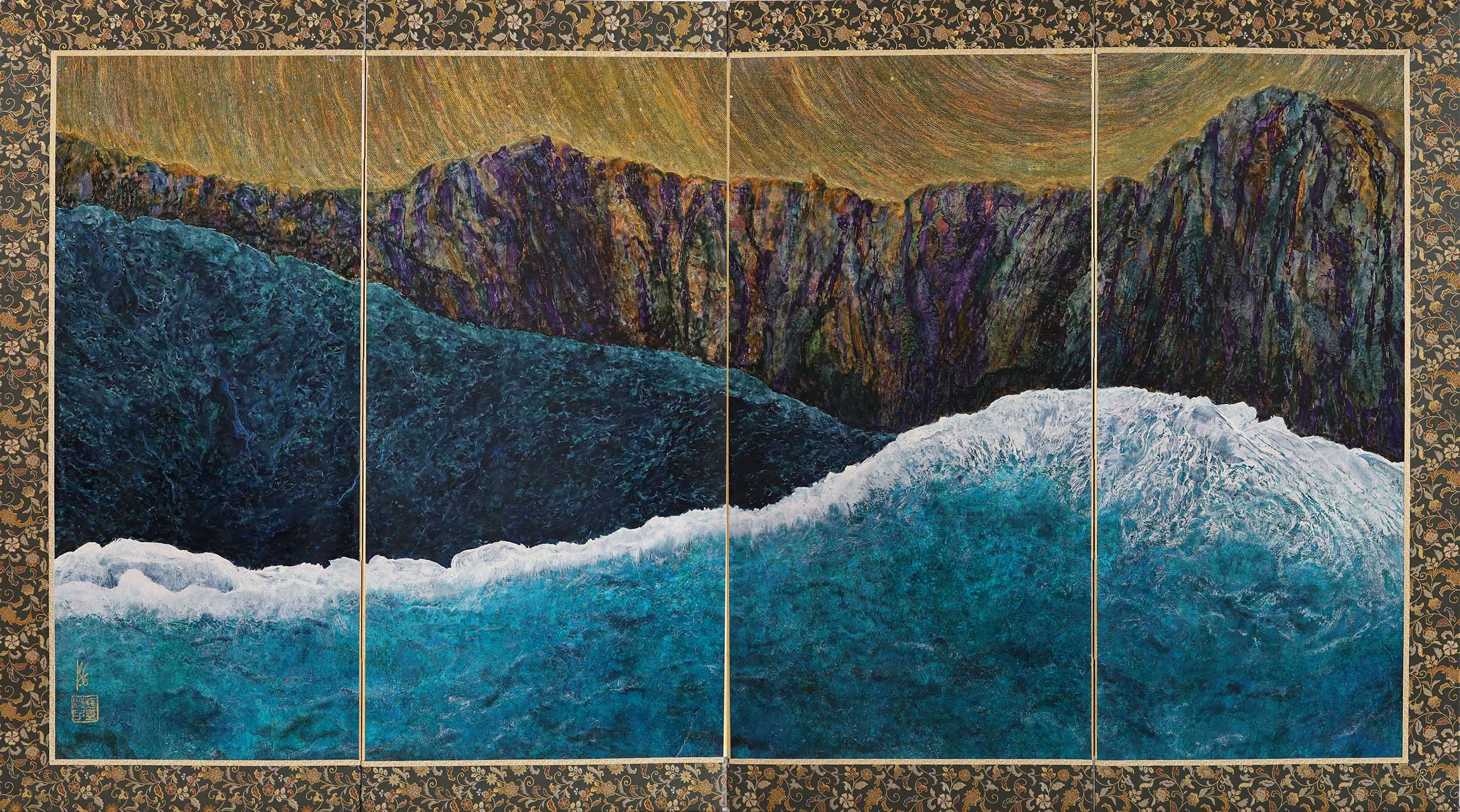
Benjamin Gordon, When We Meet Again 4-panel byōbu

The greatest Nihonga painter of the second half of the 20th century was Matazō Kayama (加山 又造; 1927–2004). He painted nearly 100 screens over a thirty-year period, several of which are in the National Museum of Modern Art, Tokyo.

[After the war] the conventions of Nihonga were being condemned, and every aspect of traditional Japanese art was being negated in a serious manner. West realism, modernism and automatic free abstraction had developed a following in Japan, and free abstraction was reaching the peak of its popularity… During this period, when I was young, I came to believe – rather simply, in a sense – in the secret but shining possibilities of Nihonga and especially of screen painting.

Since Matazo's death, very few artists still paint byōbu. Many contemporary artists continue to allude to the byōbu format, aligning multiple panels in a row, creating ultra-wide paintings. In the age of international art commerce, this is done more for ease of handling and transport, since ultimately, these works are displayed flat on a wall.

Kentaro Sato (佐藤 健太郎; b. 1990) produced an exceptional two-screen byōbu (each screen with six panels) for his Master's project at Tama Art University entitled Transfiguration of Currents (流転ノ行方). Abandoning the traditional byōbu format, Sato used individual panels, which more closely resemble fusuma (sliding screens used as interior partitions). Both he and Kiyo Hasegawa (長谷川幾与; b. 1984) paint large works using mineral pigments on Japanese paper which are then mounted on four or six individual panels, not more than 1 metre (3 ft 3 in) wide.

Allan West (b. 1962), who studied with Matazo Kayama Tokyo University of the Arts from 1989 to 1992, paints hanging scrolls, fans and folding screens:

I have found the byōbu format, with its three-dimensional surface, to be ideal for creating the kind of depth I had been aiming for. The world within the painting seems to continue on beyond the boundaries of the painting's surface. With the articulated, and reflective metallic surfaces, the works appear to change as the angle of the viewer and the light change. [Byōbu] are large scale works that place the viewer inside the painting. A painting that fills one's visual field. A painting in which one senses an animate presence in the work.

West has been commissioned to create many folding screens which are found in hotels, offices and concert halls throughout Japan.

Similar to West, but based in Europe, Benjamin Gordon (b. 1968) is an American painter whose focus is Japanese genres. While his subject matter and treatment captures the spirit of Japanese painting, unlike the Nihonga painters, Gordon paints with oil paints, creating multiple layers of translucent color. Gordon's screens are distinguished by the lack of a black outer frame. Instead, he uses unconventional fabrics for both the front and the back of his screens, which adds a layer of commentary or meaning to the subject of the painting.

Gordon and Ichiro Kikuta (b. 1961) are both unique among folding screen artists: both artists are craftsmen as well as painters (these functions are usually fulfilled by two persons: the painter and the artisan), constructing the wooden frames (or "skeleton" (骸骨) in Japanese) in the traditional manner. Kikuta's byōbu are immediately recognizable by their subject matter of birds and animals of Yambaru (forest area located near Kikuta's home in the northern part of Okinawa Island), and by the paper backs of the screens, on which woodcut patterns of fern fronds are printed.

== See also ==
- Chaekgeori
- List of partitions of traditional Japanese architecture
- Kichō (textile curtain on a portable stand)
- Noren (textile doorhanging)
- Sudare (reed blind)
