= Château de Domecy-sur-Cure =

French castle

Coordinates: 47.411155°N 3.797718°E

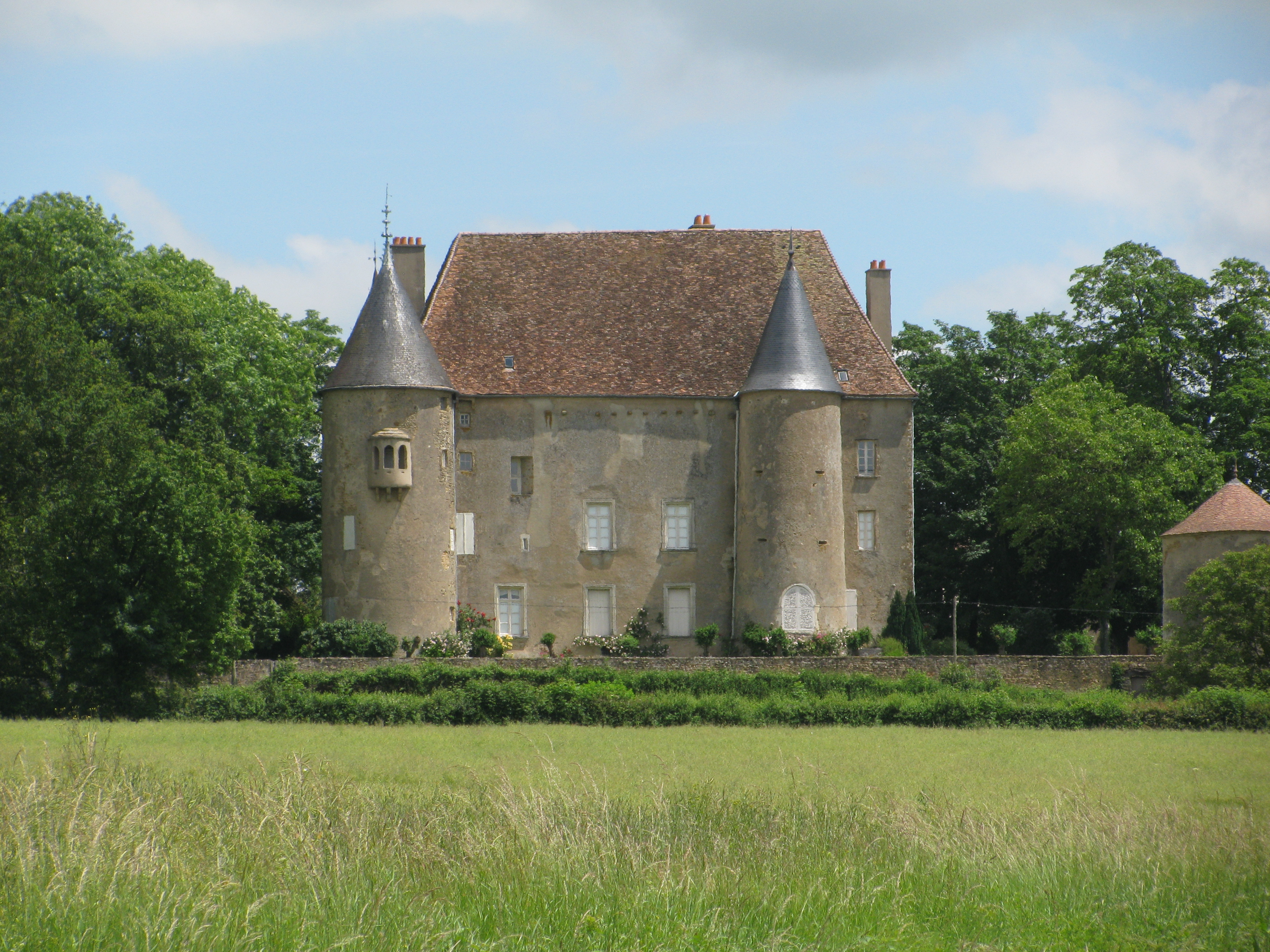
Château de Domecy-sur-Cure (2012)

The Château de Domecy-sur-Cure is a castle located in Domecy-sur-Cure in the Yonne department in Burgundy, north-central France.

The date of its construction goes back to the 15th century. Various renovation work and extensions took place in the 17th century. Inside the fireplace in the main room dates to the Renaissance. It was inscribed as a monument historique in March 1986.

The château is still privately owned.

== See also ==
- Château de Domecy-sur-le-Vault
