= Domecy-sur-Cure =

- Commune
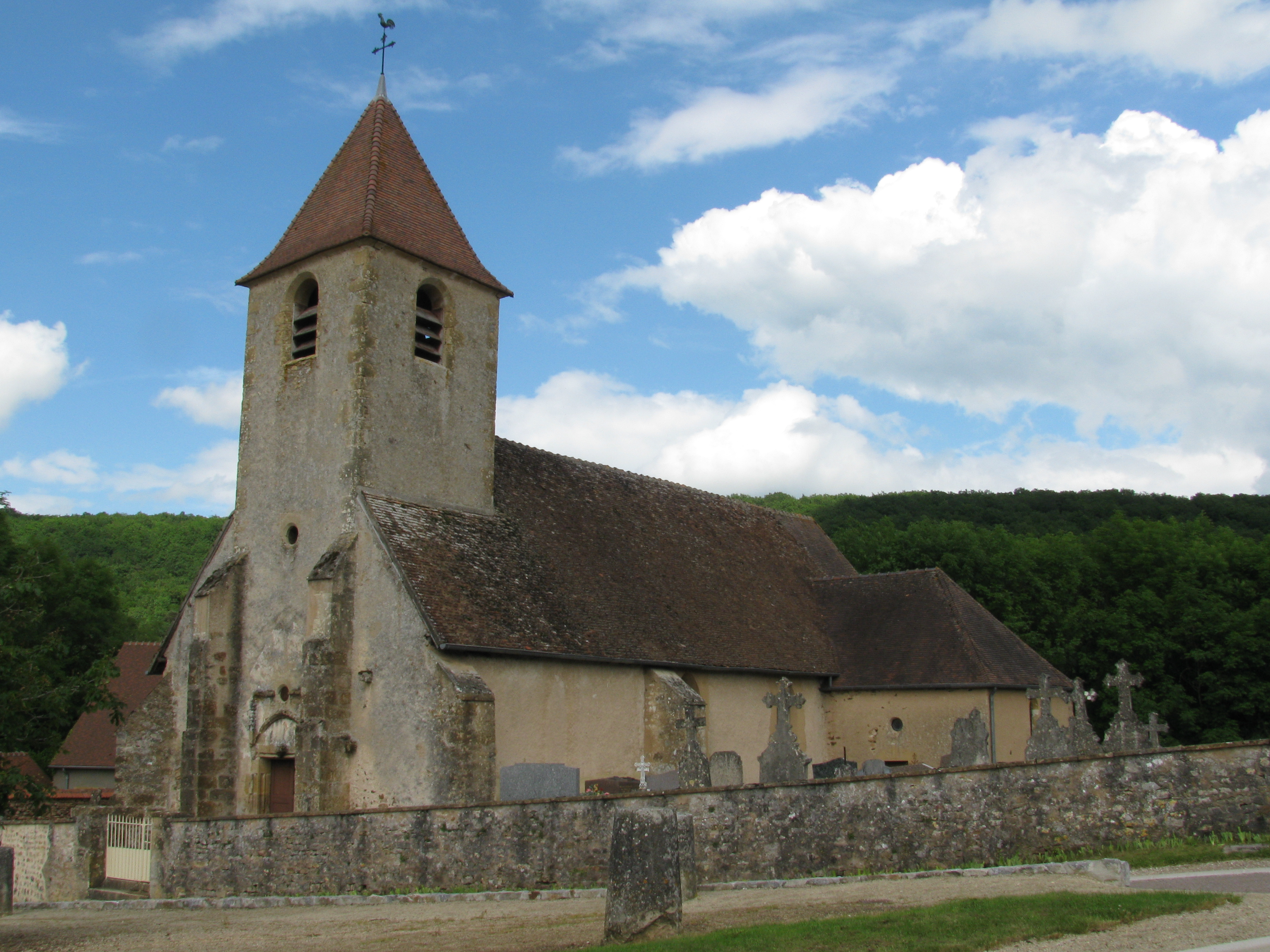
- The church in Domecy-sur-Cure
- Location of Domecy-sur-Cure
- Location within France Location within Bourgogne-Franche-Comté
- Coordinates: 47°24′55″N 3°48′39″E
- Country: France
- Region: Bourgogne-Franche-Comté
- Department: Yonne
- Arrondissement: Avallon
- Canton: Joux-la-Ville

Government
  - Mayor (2020–2026): Marc Pautet
- Area^{1}: 20.57 km^{2} (7.94 sq mi)
- Highest elevation: 351 m (1,152 ft)
- Lowest elevation: 158 m (518 ft)
- Population (2023): 403
  - Density: 19.6/km^{2} (50.7/sq mi)
- Time zone: UTC+01:00 (CET)
  - Summer (DST): UTC+02:00 (CEST)
- INSEE/Postal code: 89145 /89450
- ^{1} French Land Register data, which excludes lakes, ponds, glaciers > 1 km^{2} (0.386 sq mi or 247 acres) and river estuaries.

Domecy-sur-Cure (French pronunciation: [dɔmsi syʁ kyʁ], literally Domecy on Cure) is a commune in the Yonne department in Bourgogne-Franche-Comté in north-central France.

The commune is known for the Château de Domecy-sur-Cure, which dates back to the 15th century.

== See also ==
- Communes of the Yonne department
- Parc naturel régional du Morvan
