= Château de Domecy-sur-le-Vault =

Château in Yonne, Burgundy, France

Coordinates: 47.494559°N 3.807254°E

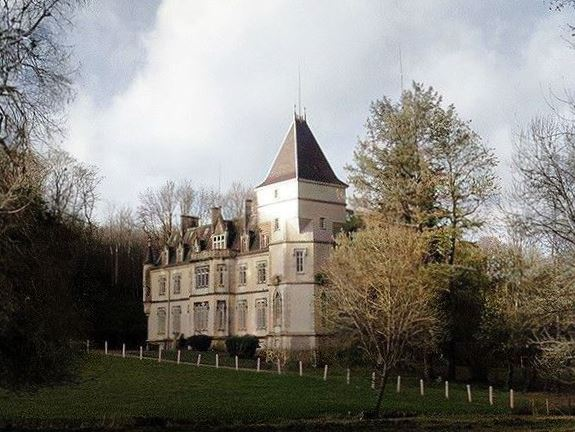
Château de Domecy-sur-le-Vault (2009)

The Château de Domecy-sur-le-Vault is a château located in Domecy-sur-le-Vault close to Sermizelles in the Yonne department in Burgundy, north-central France.

== History ==
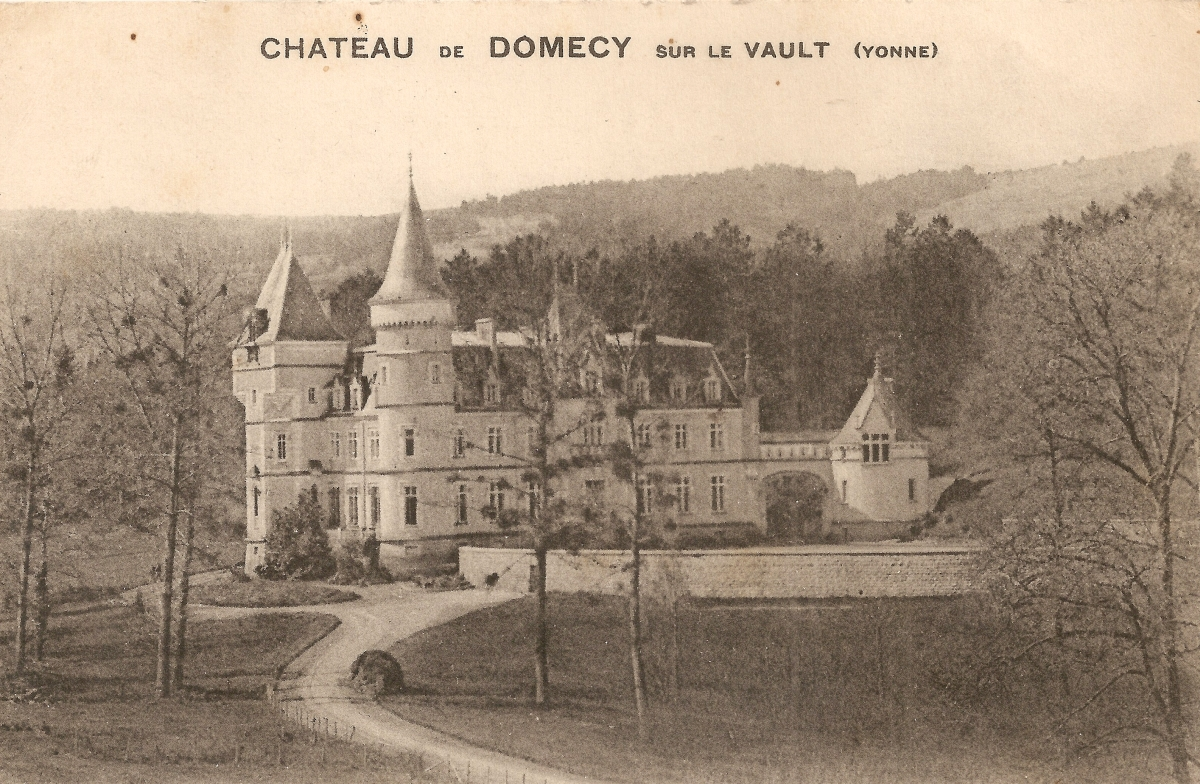
Photograph of the castle before 1945

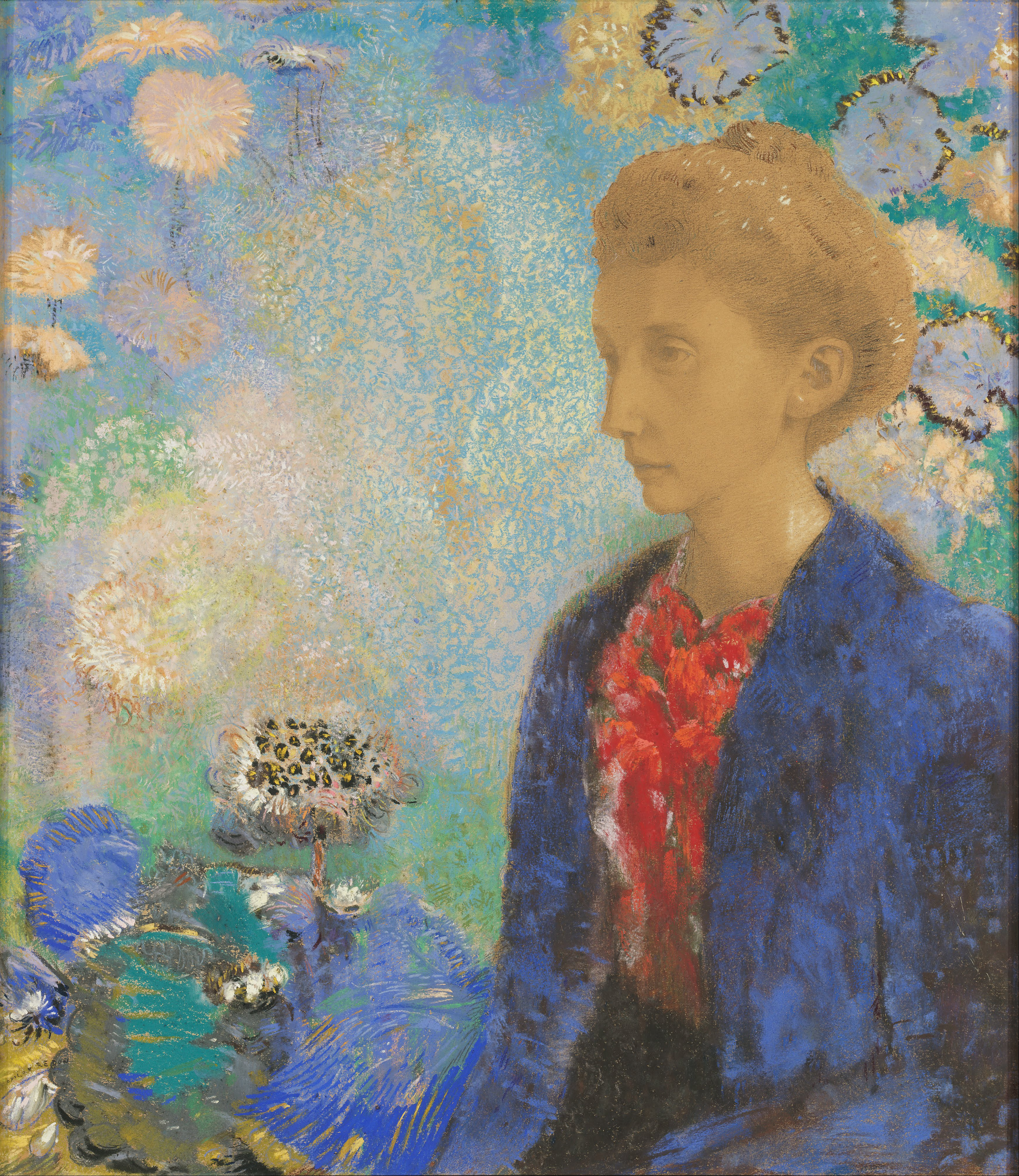
Portrait of Baroness Robert de Domecy (1900)

Chateau de Domecy-sur-le-Vault is first mentioned in texts dating back to 1316. At that time, the stronghold was in the hands of the family d'Ostun, in whose possession it remained for over a century. In 1440, the lordship and castle passed by marriage to Edme de Salins, and in 1478, to his son Jean. The son also owned a house in Avallon in front of the church of Saint Lazarus, which was known as hôtel des Sires de Domecy. In 1507 Domecy was sold to Louis de Robert. Claude Longueville, Lord of Santigny, brought Domecy into his family in 1537, when he married Philiberte de Robert. In 1569, the fortified house was burned down by troops of Frederick Louis, Count Palatine of Zweibrücken.

The land was sold in 1748 to Michel-Auguste de Denesvre, whose family occupied the first ranks of society in Avallon. They undertook the reconstruction of the south wing of the castle to give it the current appearance.

=== Panels by Redon ===
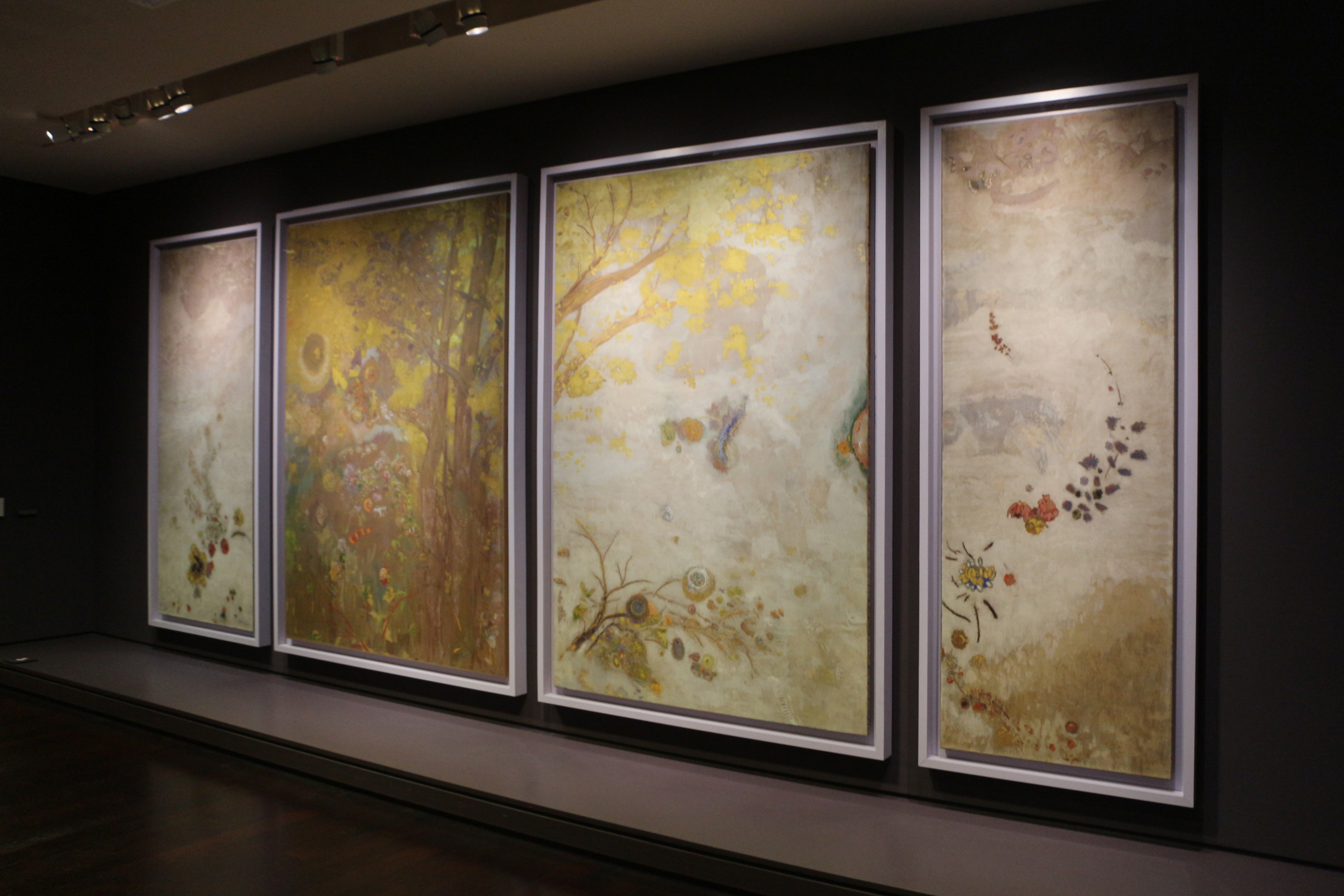
Panels painted by Odilon Redon in 1901 for the dining room of the château

Baron Robert de Domecy (1867–1946) commissioned the artist Odilon Redon in 1899 to create 17 decorative panels for the dining room. He also commissioned Redon to do portraits of his wife and their daughter Jeanne, two of which are in the collections of the Musée d'Orsay and the Getty Museum in California. Most of the paintings remained in the family collection until the 1960s. Fifteen of the panels are located today in the Musée d'Orsay, which entered the museum in 1988. Redon created large decorative works for private residences in the past. The panels he painted for the château de Domecy in 1900–1901 were his most radical compositions. They mark the transition from the ornamental to abstract painting. The landscape details do not show a specific place or space. Only details of trees, twigs with leaves, and budding flowers in an endless horizon can be seen. The colours used are mostly yellow, grey, brown and light blue. The influence of the Japanese painting style found on folding screens byōbu is discernible in his choice of colours and the rectangular proportions of most of the up to 2.5 metres high panels.

== See also ==
- Château de Domecy-sur-Cure

== Literature ==
- Françoise Vignier. Dictionnaire des Châteaux de France, Bourgogne et Nivernais.
