= Jonathan Woodner =

American rally driver (1944–1988)

Jonathan Woodner (April 8, 1944 – April 24, 1988) was an American real estate developer and road racing driver. He was the son of Ian Woodner (1903–1990) and Ruth Lyon Woodner of Westport, Connecticut. Jonathan Woodner, who was born in Manhattan, ran the company's Washington interests and was president of the Ian Woodner Family Art Collection Foundation.

== Biography ==
Woodner competed in 12 to 15 rally road races annually in Europe. He won the 1972 SCCA National Championship in an MG Midget. The Woodner Cup, awarded annually since 1989, is named in honor of Woodner. After rallying became dominated by 4WD cars in the '80s, Woodner's skillful driving and capable rally car proved that 2WD could still pose a serious competitive threat. Woodner was involved in car racing before joining his father's real estate company, the Jonathan Woodner Company, in 1974. His father, Ian, had named the Manhattan-based company after his son. The Jonathan Woodner Company is still operating today and is held by Jonathan's sisters, Diane and Andrea. The Woodner Apartments, completed in 1951 in Washington, DC with over 1,000 units, is named after Woodner. The Woodner Apartments is DC's largest single-structure apartment building, and was the largest air-conditioned building in the world when it debuted in 1952.

Woodner was killed in the crash of his Formula One Shoestring on April 24, 1988; he had only flown the plane a handful of times despite being a licensed pilot for more than twenty years. The wreckage, which was found two miles from the Montgomery County Airpark in Maryland, indicated that the plane went down with a "heavy impact". The National Transportation Safety Board investigation indicated that "the pilot improperly performing aerobatics without sufficient altitude to complete a recovery."

== See also ==
- Jensen-Healey - racing
- 1975 Formula Atlantic season
