= Sermizelles =

- Commune
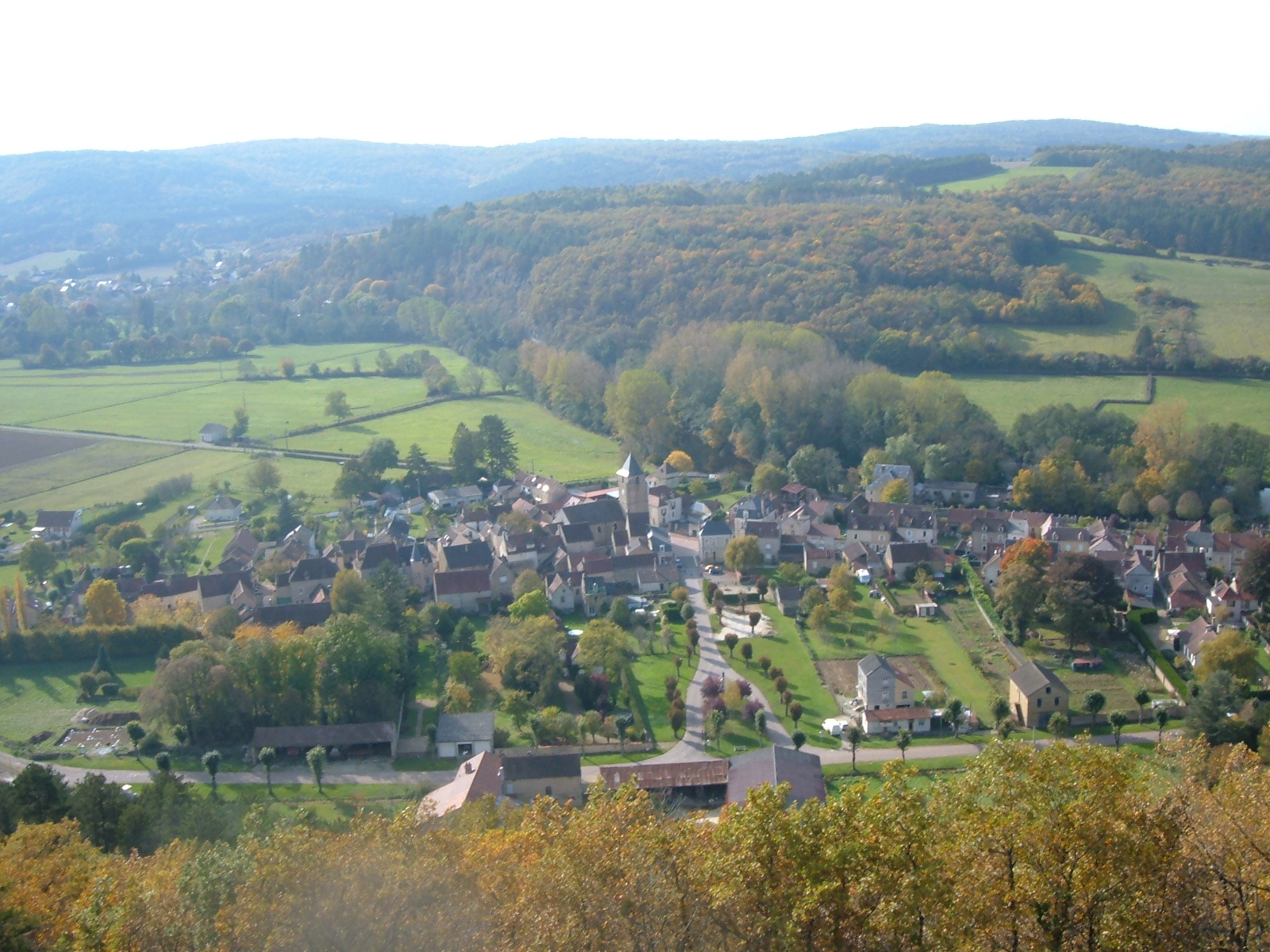
- A general view of Sermizelles
- Location of Sermizelles
- Location within France Location within Bourgogne-Franche-Comté
- Coordinates: 47°32′13″N 3°47′38″E
- Country: France
- Region: Bourgogne-Franche-Comté
- Department: Yonne
- Arrondissement: Avallon
- Canton: Avallon

Government
  - Mayor (2020–2026): Franck Moinard
- Area^{1}: 7.01 km^{2} (2.71 sq mi)
- Highest elevation: 265 m (869 ft)
- Lowest elevation: 127 m (417 ft)
- Population (2023): 248
  - Density: 35.4/km^{2} (91.6/sq mi)
- Time zone: UTC+01:00 (CET)
  - Summer (DST): UTC+02:00 (CEST)
- INSEE/Postal code: 89392 /89200
- ^{1} French Land Register data, which excludes lakes, ponds, glaciers > 1 km^{2} (0.386 sq mi or 247 acres) and river estuaries.

Sermizelles (French pronunciation: [sɛʁmizɛl]) is a commune in the Yonne department in Bourgogne-Franche-Comté in north-central France.

Located close by is the Château de Domecy-sur-le-Vault.

== See also ==
- Communes of the Yonne department
