= Ian Woodner =

American artist, art collector and real estate developer

- Born: January 25, 1903; New York, New York
- Died: November 1, 1990 (aged 87); New York, New York
- Occupation: Real Estate Developer
- Known for: Art Collector

Ian Woodner (January 25, 1903 – November 1, 1990) was an American real estate developer, artist and art collector.

== Early life and education ==
Woodner was born in New York City to a Polish immigrant family. He was raised in Minneapolis, Minnesota. He received a bachelor's degree in architecture from the University of Minnesota and a master's from Harvard University. He received a fellowship to study abroad in Europe and the Middle East. He attended the École des Beaux-Arts in Paris, where he won nine medals during his postgraduate work. He was married to Ruth Lyon Woodner of Westport, Connecticut.

== Real estate developer ==
Woodner had a role in designing the Central Park Zoo and various buildings at the 1939 World's Fair. Woodner began building houses in Wilmington, Delaware and later concentrated on Washington, D.C., and the New York metropolitan region, where his company erected housing complexes in Manhattan, Flushing, Queens and Yonkers. In 1945, Woodner founded the Jonathan Woodner Company, which has built residential and commercial properties in New York, the District of Columbia and Atlanta. The company was named for Woodner's infant son, Jonathan, who later joined the business along with his sisters, Dian and Andrea. Jonathan Woodner died in an airplane crash in Maryland in 1988.

== Art collector and artist ==
Woodner began collecting art in the early 1950s. His collection of drawings included works by Raphael, Tiepolo, Cellini, Correggio, Dürer, Holbein, Goya and Rembrandt. His collections have had major showings at the Metropolitan Museum of Art, the Royal Academy, the Prado and other galleries. The best of Woodner's rare old master drawings, were either sold or donated to the National Gallery of Art after his death. Woodner's interest in art collecting stemmed from his own work over the years in watercolors and pastels, which has been exhibited in New York, Munich and Jerusalem. Some of his work is still on display today in the lobby of the Woodner Apartments in Washington, D.C.

His collection of drawings includes works from the 14th through the 20th century and includes extremely rare drawings by Botticelli and Cellini. In 1989, when the Woodner collection was shown at the Metropolitan, Woodner said:

I'm an artist and I see these things as an artist, as Vasari did. A collector requires only two basic qualities, taste and boldness: The ability to see a good work and the willingness to buy it on his own judgment alone.

His family foundation, the Ian Woodner Family Collection, supports exhibitions, museum education programs and university art and architecture scholarships. It has also endowed a professorship of architecture at Harvard University and a curatorship in drawings at the Fogg Art Museum at Harvard.

== See also ==
- Jonathan Woodner
