= Villas and palaces in Milan =

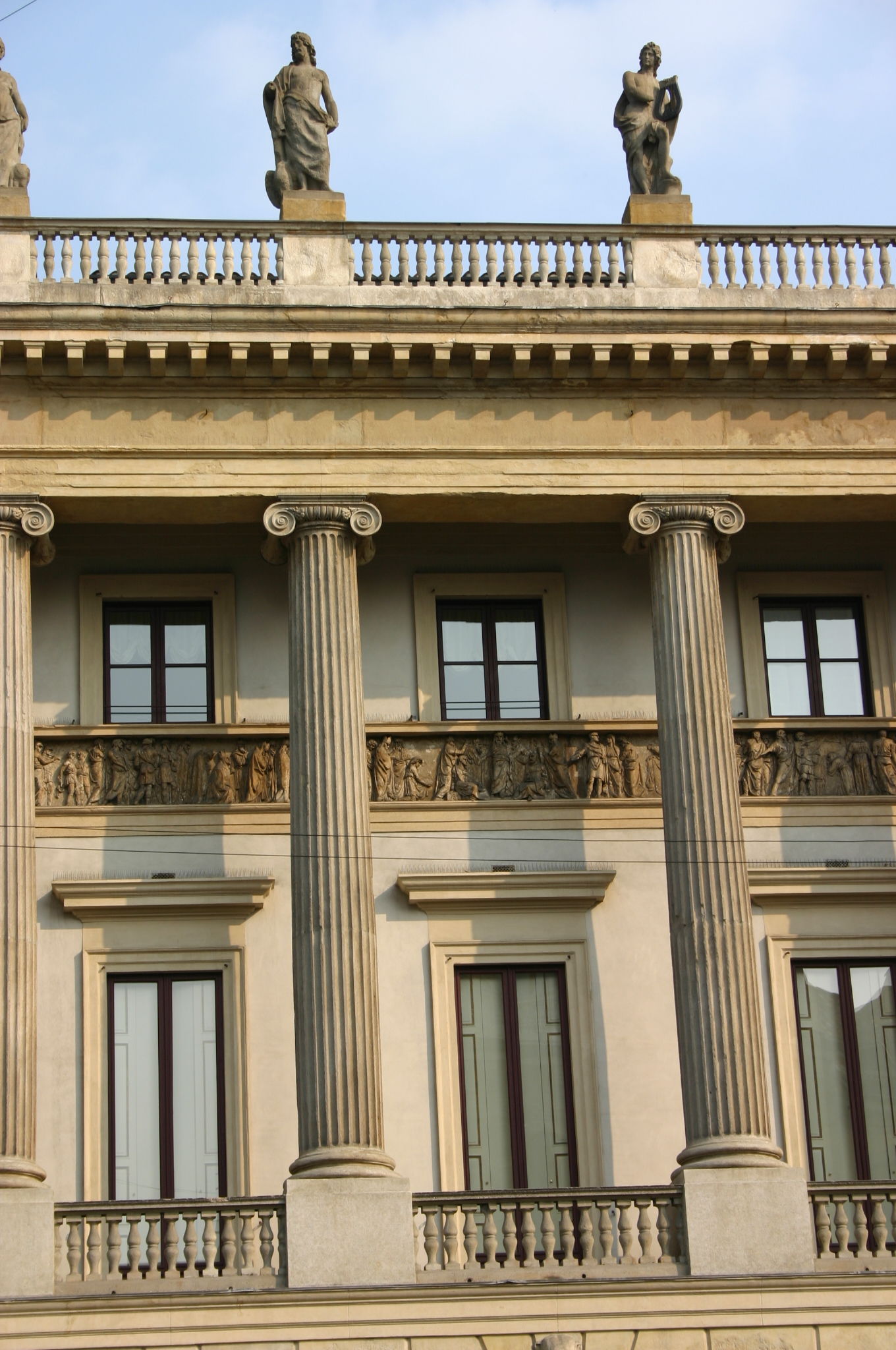
Palazzo Saporiti

Villas and palaces in Milan are used to indicate public and private buildings in Milan of particular artistic and architectural value. The lack of a royal court did not give Milan the prerequisites for a significant development of building construction; nevertheless it contains architectural works from different eras and different styles: from Romanesque to neo-Gothic, from Baroque to eclectic, from Italian twentieth century to rationalism.

== History ==
The Emperor's Palace.

The spread of the construction of patrician villas in Milan has early origins. Archaeological excavations have revealed a complex system of villas from the first imperial age, going back to about the 1st century BCE.

After the fall of the Barbarians and the end of the Middle Ages, a new tradition of aristocratic refinement, chivalry and good taste was established in Milan by the ruling Visconti and Sforza families. Throughout the 15th and 16th centuries the local nobility built luxurious residences to demonstrate their power and influence. Today only a few examples of these can still be seen, such as the ducal apartments of the Castello Sforzesco and other private villas such as Casa Borromeo and Casa Pallavicini. Not only Lombard but also Venetian, Ligurian, Piedmontese and Tuscan artists contributed to their design and decoration, the latter especially in the creation of frescoes.

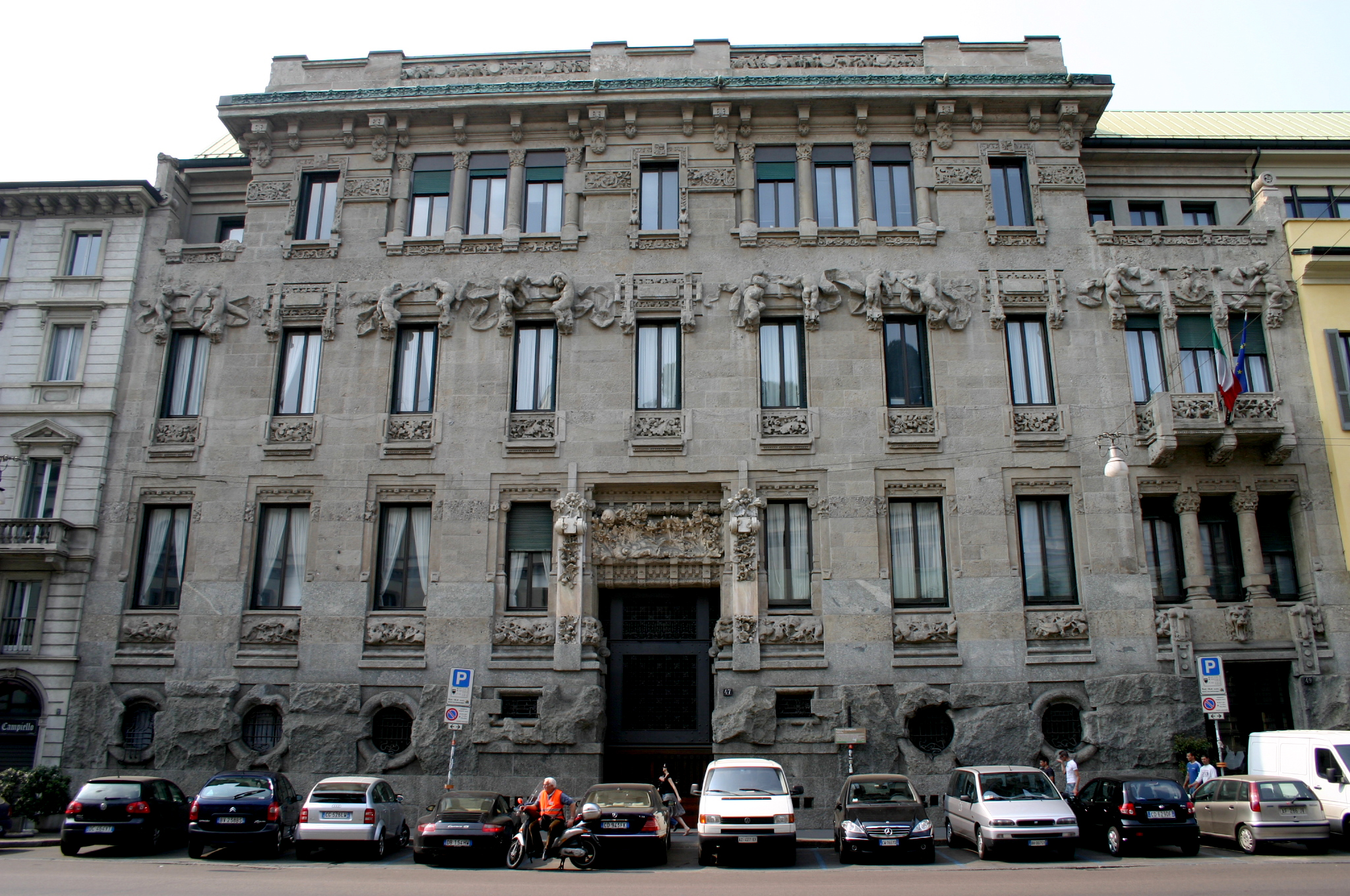
The Palazzo Castiglioni.

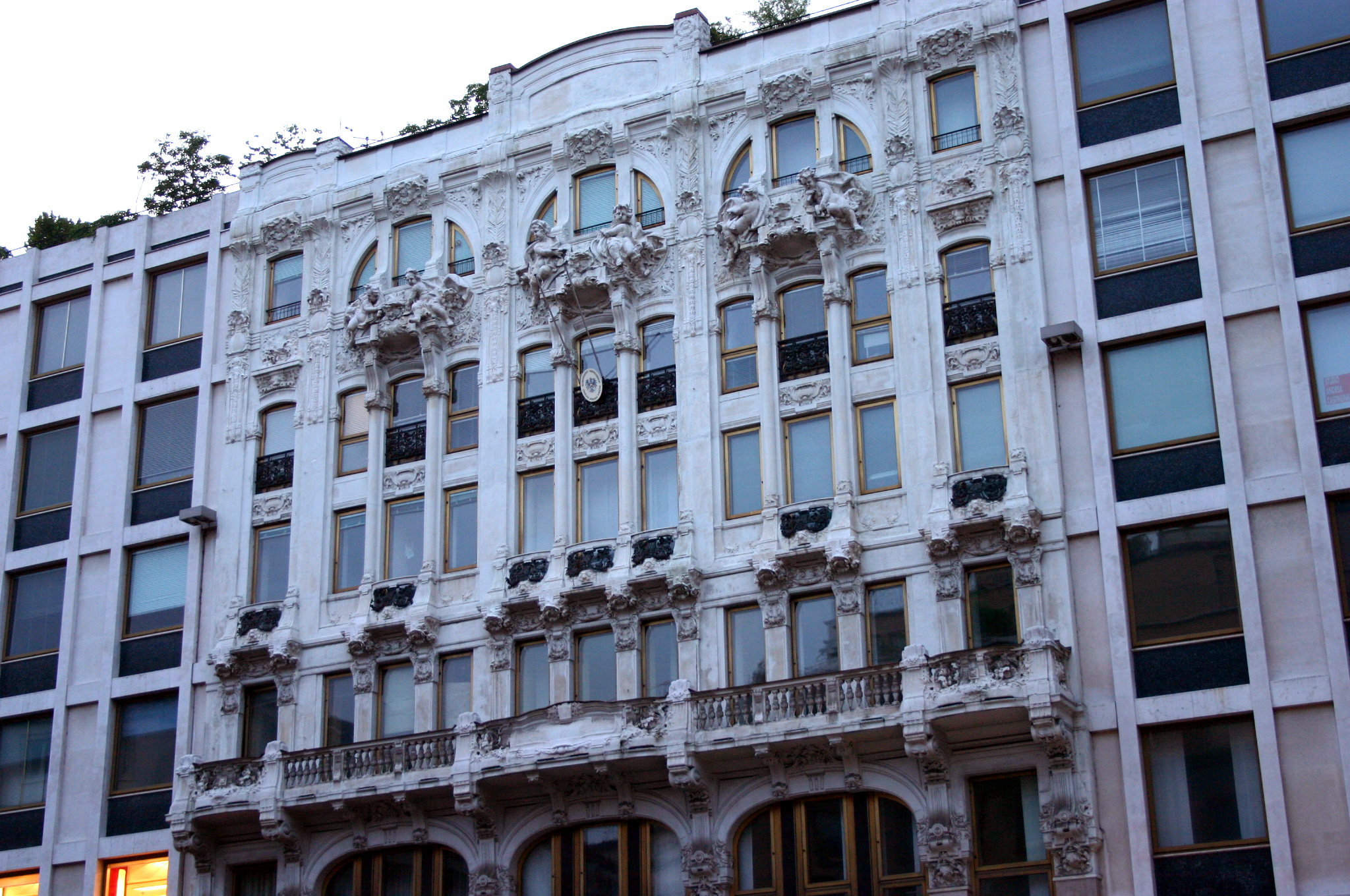
The Hotel Corso (ex Trianon).

The subsequent Spanish domination somewhat curbed the carefree enthusiasm of the humanist era, tending to favour the development of private architecture and making way for it by demolishing existing buildings.

The 18th century above all was marked by the construction in Milan of so-called "villas of delight" (ville di delizia). As the concept of the summer residence spread, villas were built there for nobles from Rome, Venice, Turin, Bologna and Naples who conducted their business in Milan.

With the Industrial Revolution came a new period of growth and an enhancement of the architectural beauty of the city, brought about during the 19th century by the influence of the Habsburgs, who sought to endow Milan with a new visual dimension since at this stage it was the second city of the empire after Vienna.

The 20th century was the last period of the "villas of delight". When it entered the new Kingdom of Italy Milan had become an industrial centre of major importance to the new economy and in particular one of the key points for exchanges with Europe. The bourgeoisie then settled in the city as the new 'aristocrats' of the Second Industrial Revolution, seeking to return Milan to the grandeur of the past.

Despite the extraordinary architectural heritage of the city, what can be seen today represents only a small part of what was created throughout the entire history of the city: the traditional tendency to build after having demolished already existing palaces, together with bombings from the Second World War, greatly reduces the heritage of the city.

== A list of palaces ==
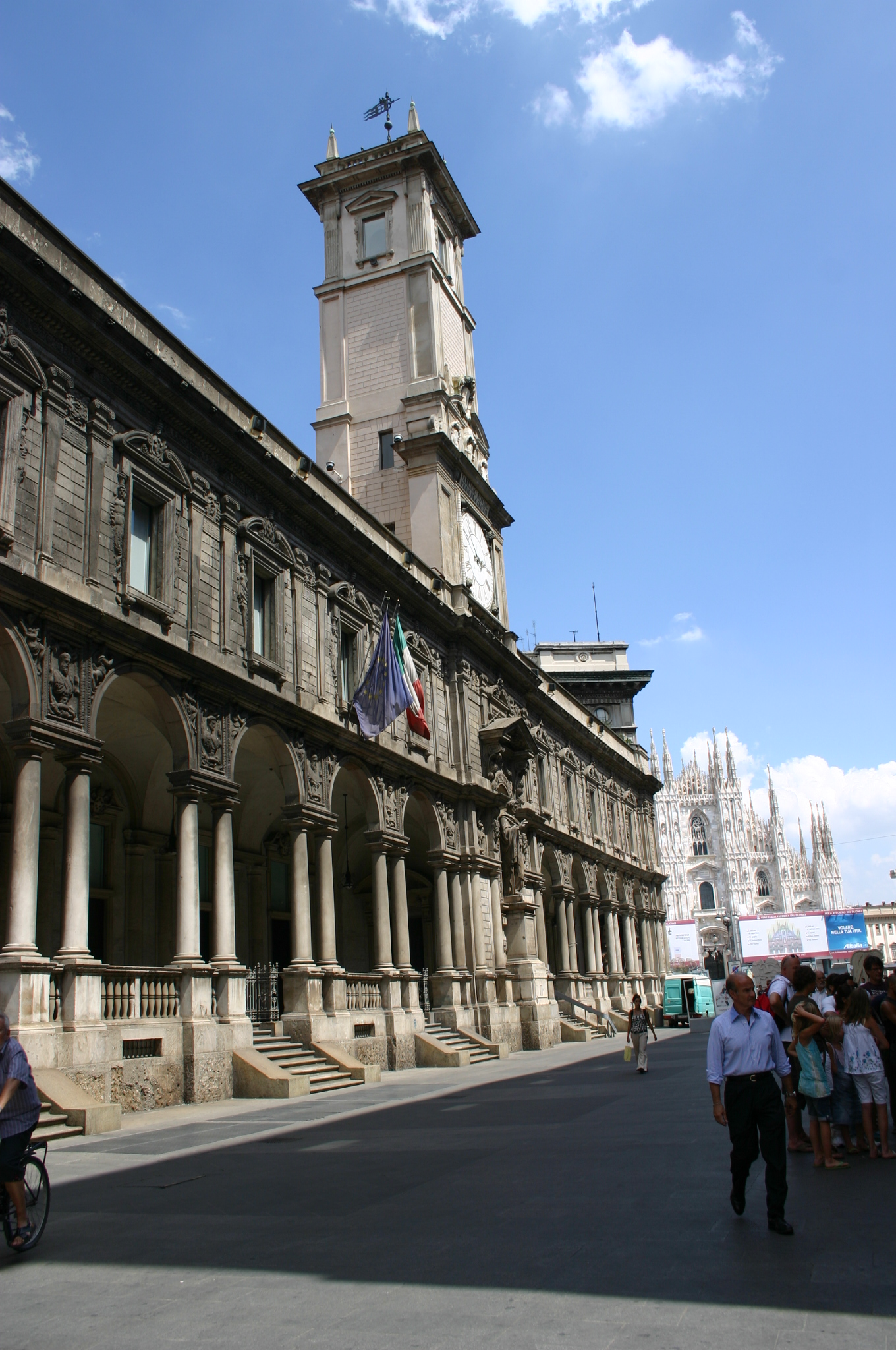
Palazzo dei Giureconsulti.

=== Roman ===
- The Emperor's Palace

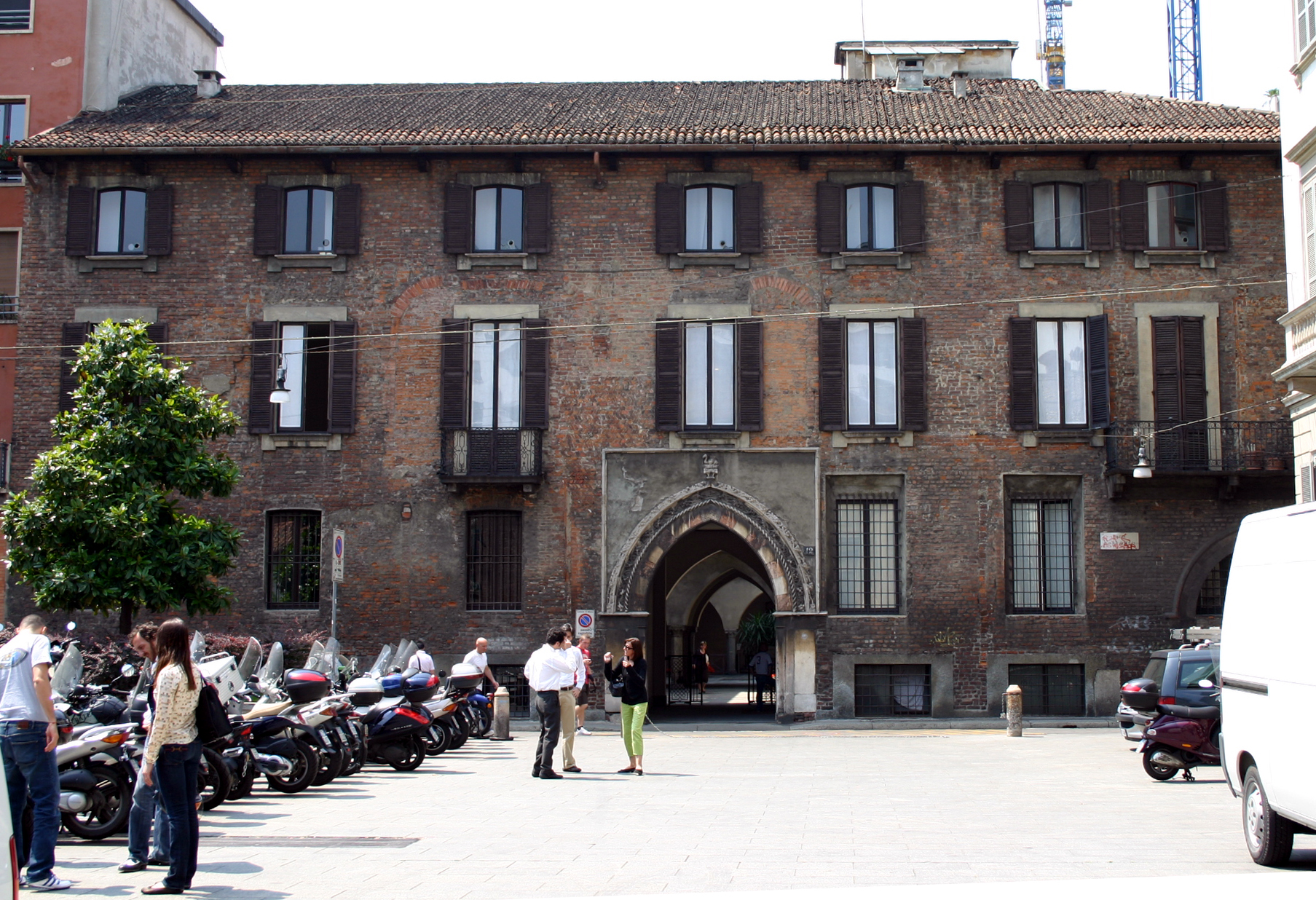
The Palazzo Borromeo.

=== 13th century ===
- Casa Panigarola (Piazza Mercanti)
- Palazzo della Ragione or the Broletto nuovo (Piazza Mercanti)

=== 14th century ===
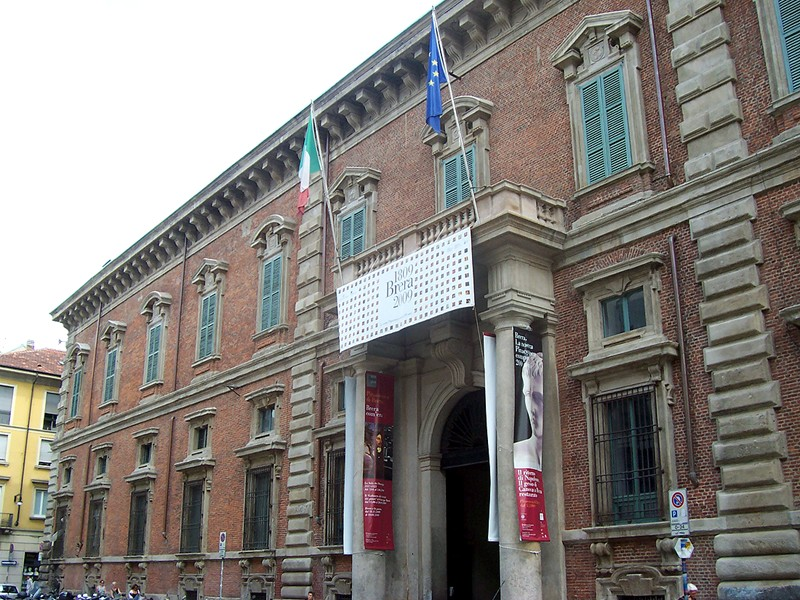
Palazzo di Brera.

- Loggia degli Osii

=== 15th century ===
- Casa Atellani (Corso Magenta)
- Casa Fontana Silvestri (Corso Venezia)
- Casa Parravicini (Via Cino del Duca)
- Cascina (della) Boscaiola or Cascina Boscarola
- Cascina Pozzobonelli
- Palazzo Acerbi
- Palazzo Carmagnola
- Palazzo Castani (Piazza San Sepolcro), seat of the Questura di Milano
- Palazzo Castelli-Borromeo (Piazza Borromeo)
- Palazzo Isimbardi
- Palazzo Pozzobonelli-Isimbardi
- Villa Mirabello (Via Villa Mirabello, 6), also known as the "Cascina Mirabello"

=== 16th century ===
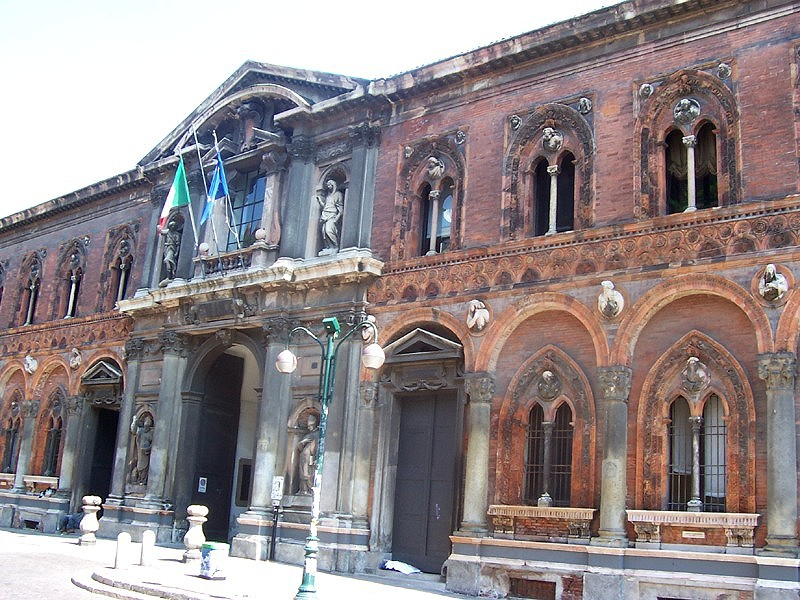
Ca' Granda.

- Palazzo di Brera (Via Brera)
- Palazzo dei Giureconsulti (Piazza Mercanti)
- Palazzo Marino, (Piazza della Scala)
- Palazzo Recalcati
- Palazzo delle Scuole Palatine
- Palazzo Stampa di Soncino, Casati
- Palazzo Taverna (Via Bigli)
- Villa Simonetta (Via Stilicone)

=== 17th century ===
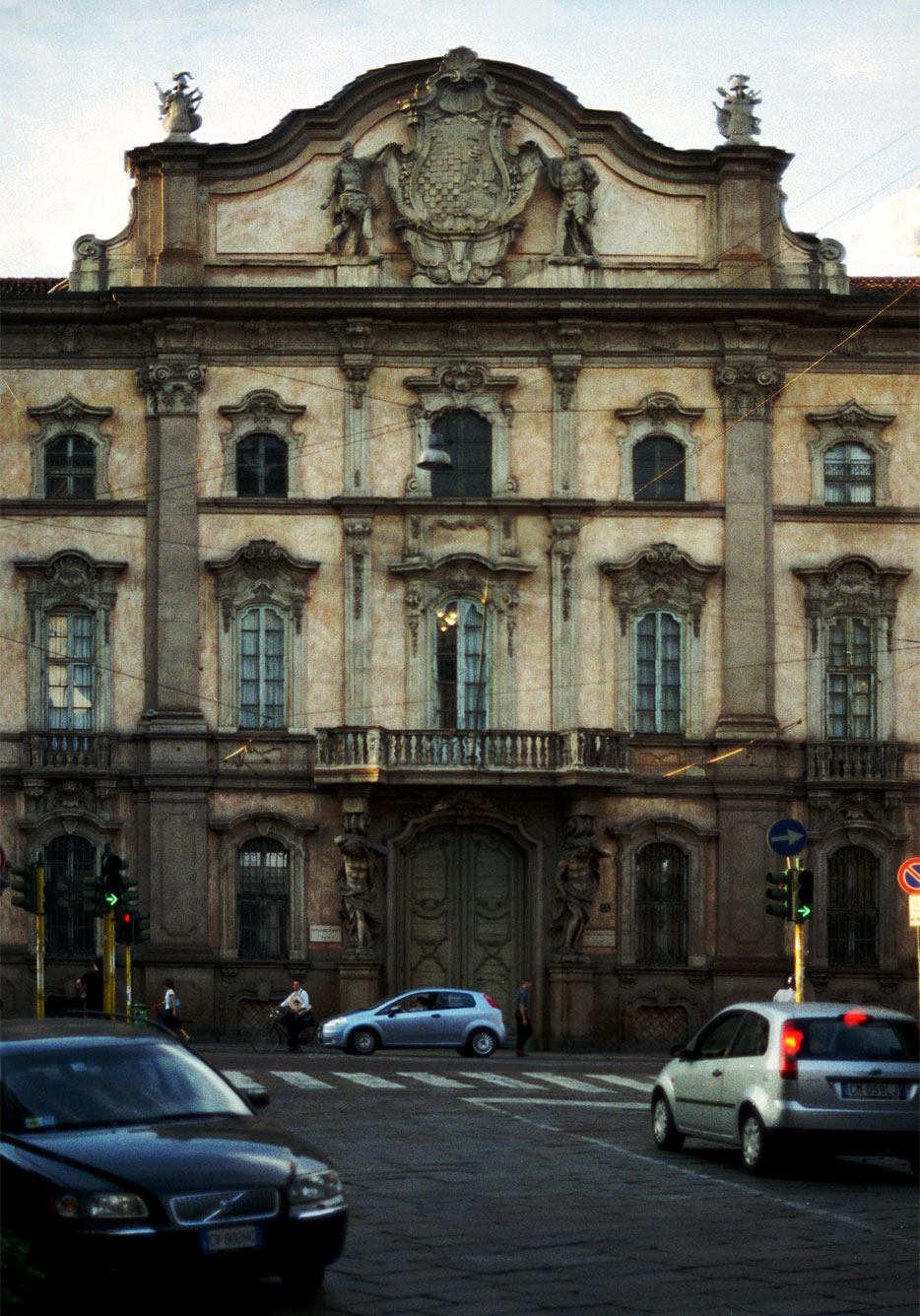
Palazzo Litta.

- Casa Buttafava
- Casa Crespi (Corso Venezia)
- Casa degli Omenoni (Via degli Omenoni)
- Casa Toscanini
- Palazzo Annoni (Corso di Porta Romana, 6)
- Palazzo Arcivescovile
- Palazzo del Capitano di Giustizia (Corso Europa)
- Palazzo Cusani (Via Brera, 15)
- Palazzo Dugnani (Via Manin, 2)
- Palazzo Durini (Via Durini)
- Palazzo Erba Odescalchi
- Palazzo Litta or Palazzo Arese (Corso Magenta, 24)
- Palazzo Olivazzi (Via Bigli)
- Palazzo Orsini (Via Borgonuovo)
- Palazzo Pusterla Brivio
- Palazzo delle ex Scuole Arcimbolde
- Palazzo del Senato (Via Senato)
- Palazzo Sormani (Corso di Porta Vittoria, 6), seat of the Biblioteca Comunale di Milano
- Palazzo delle Stelline
- Palazzo Toscanini (Via Durini)

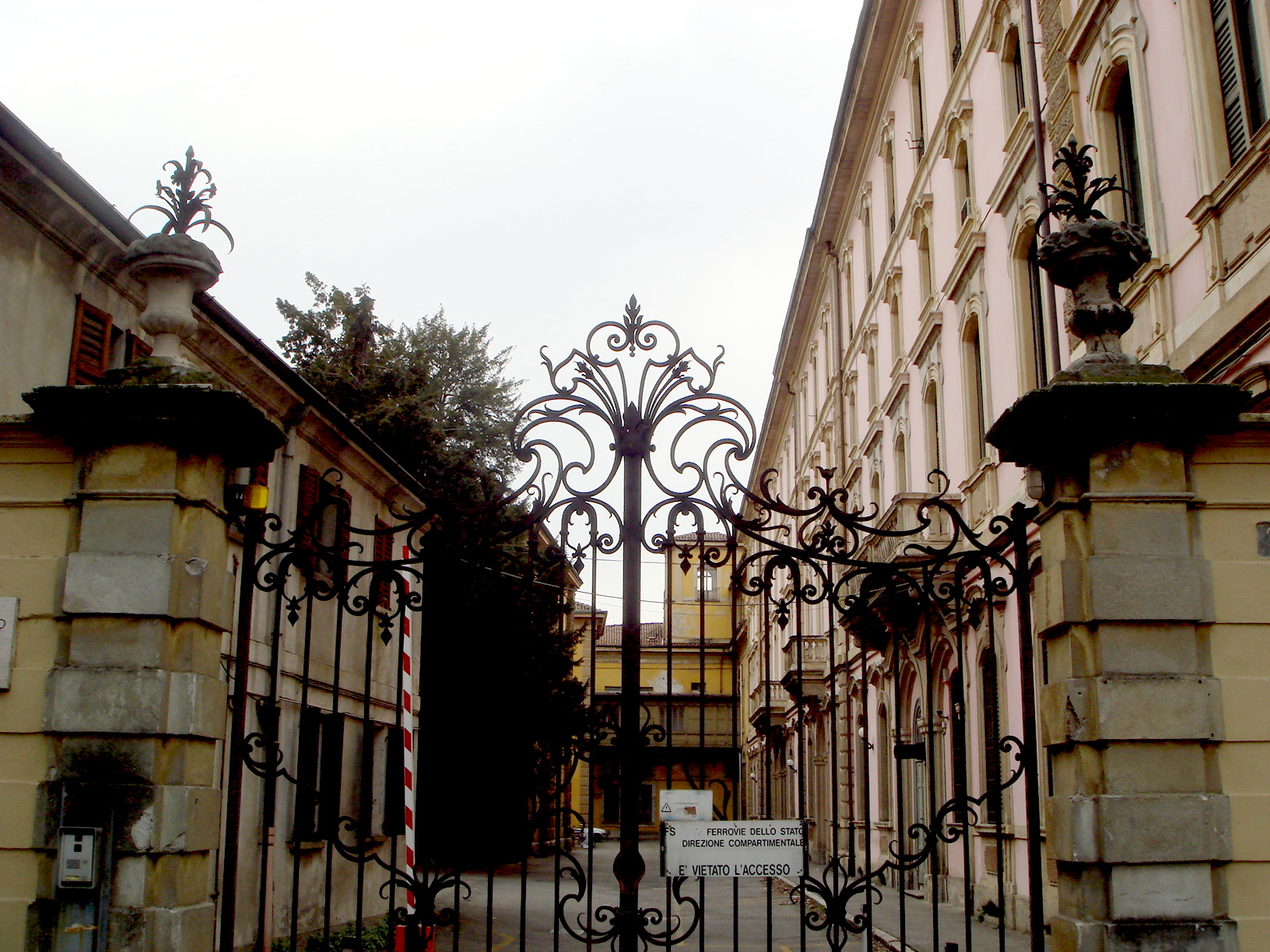
Rear view of Palazzo Litta.

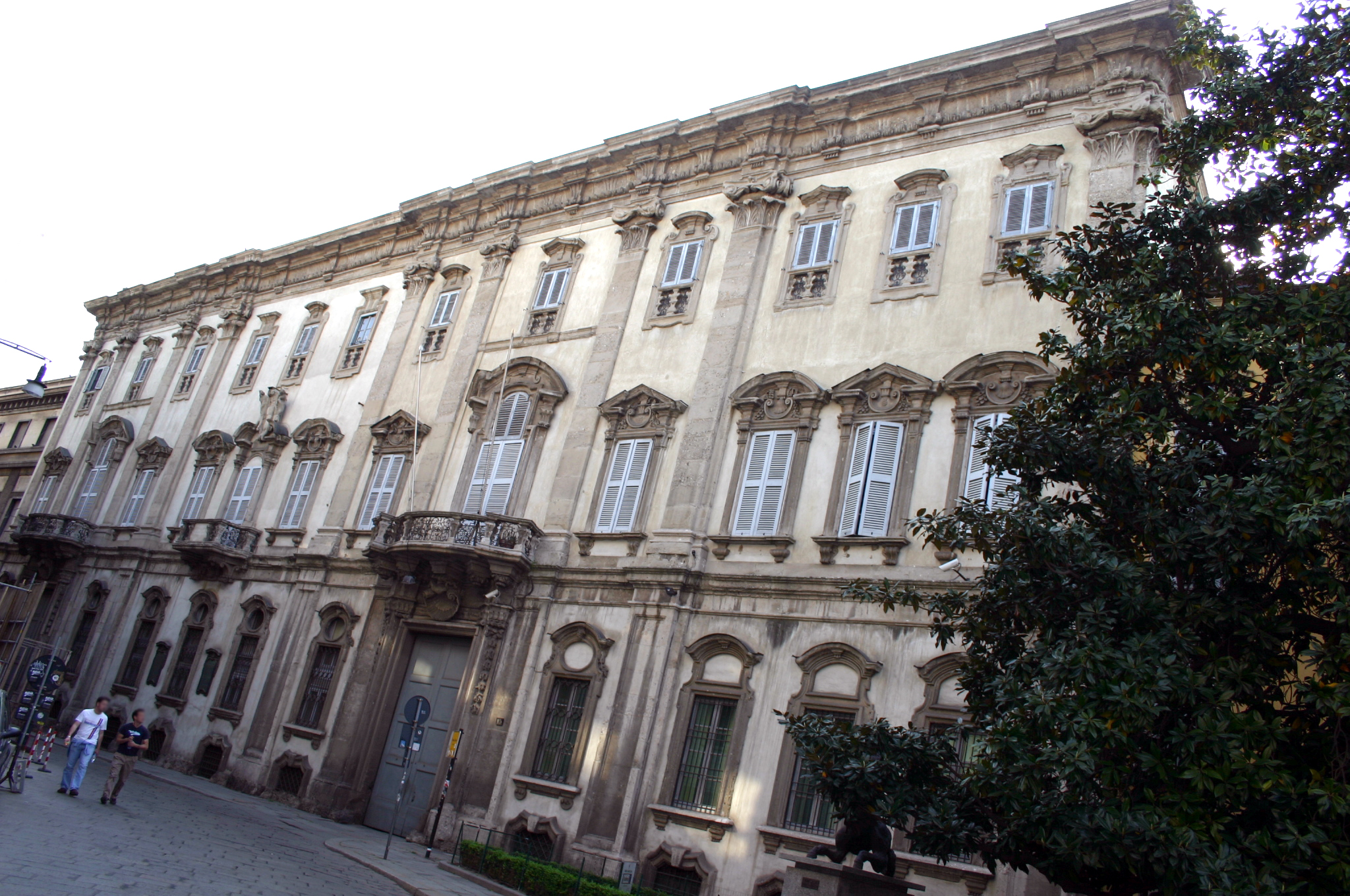
Palazzo Cusani.

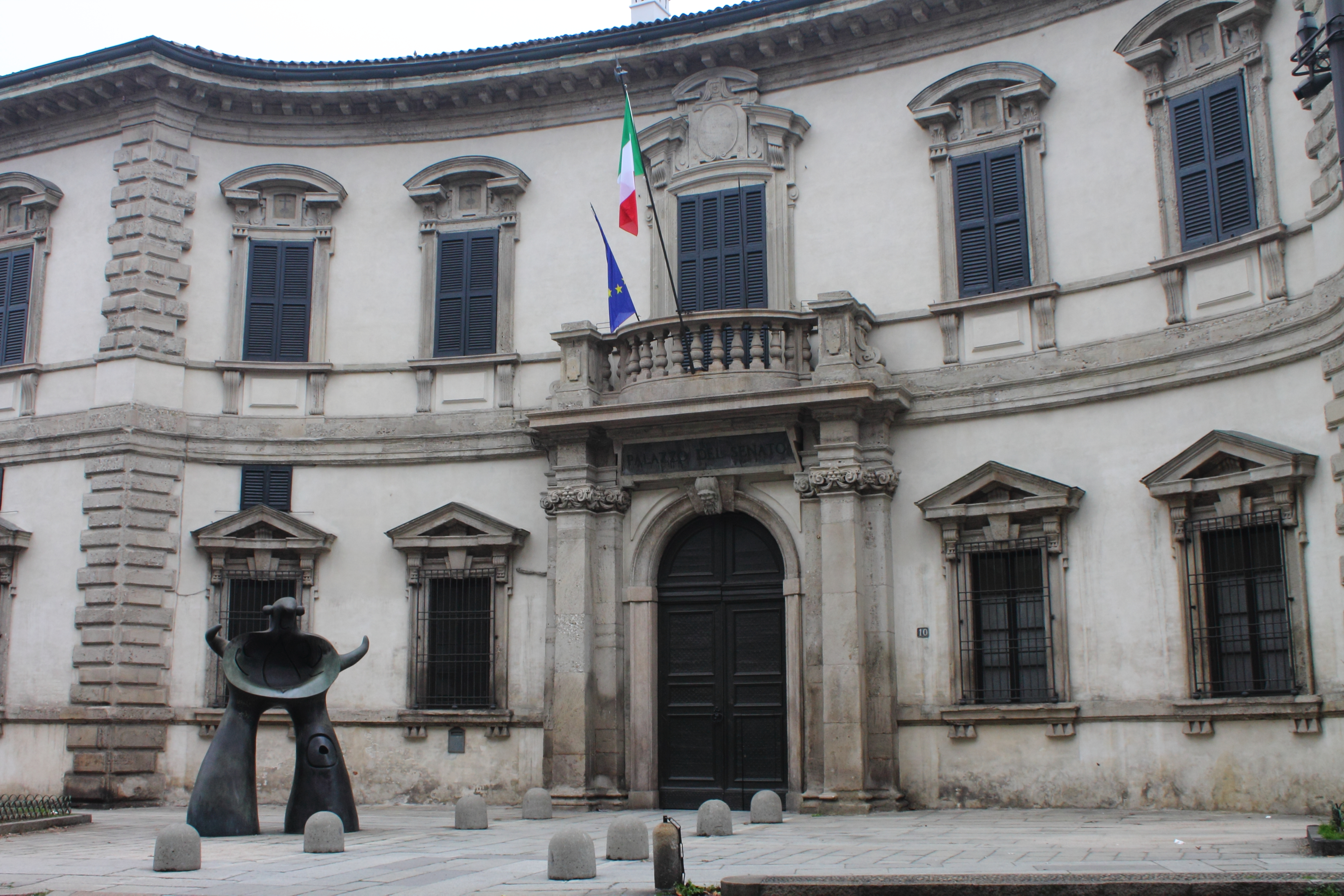
Palazzo del Senato.

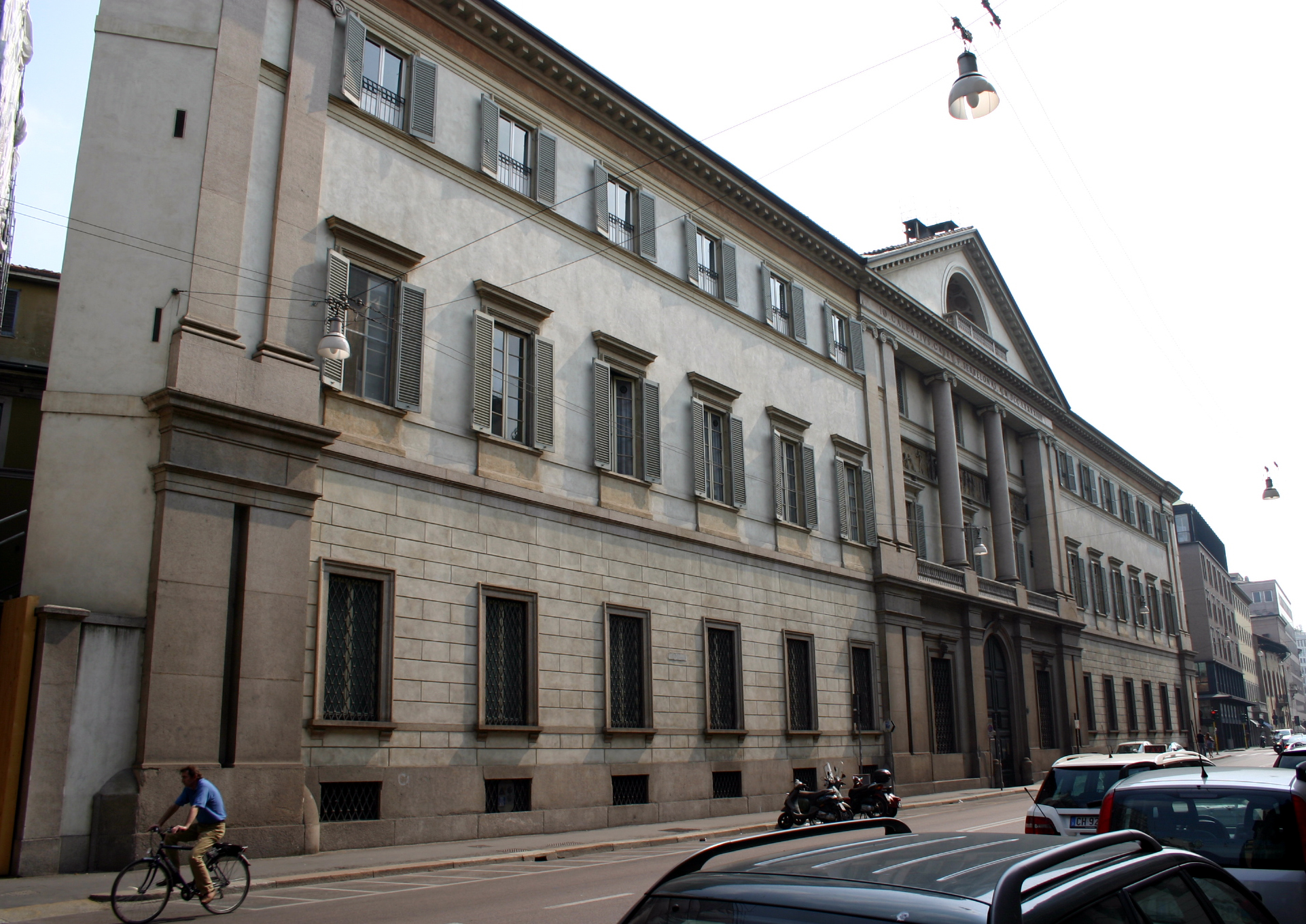
Palazzo Serbelloni.

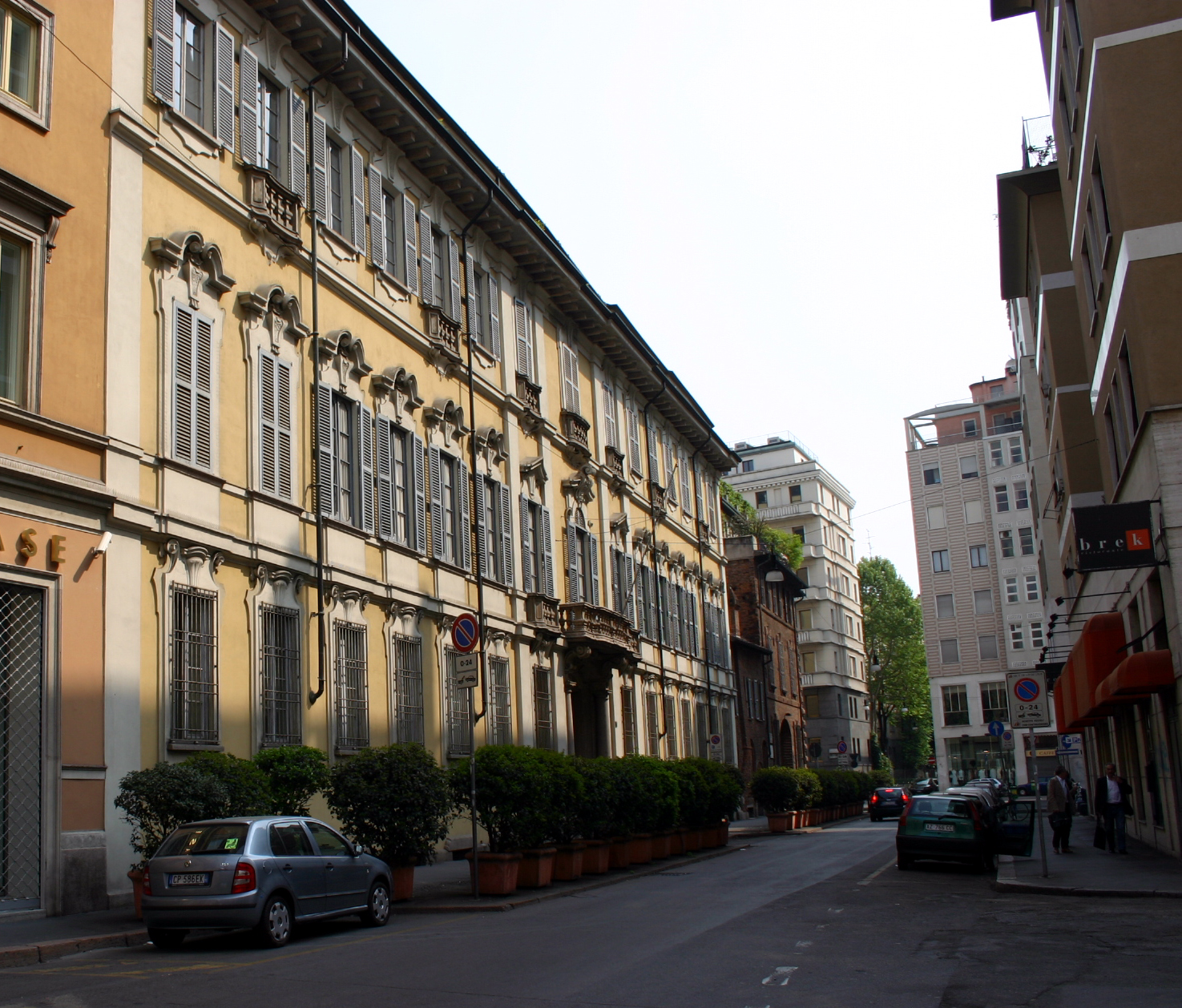
Palazzo Visconti di Grazzano.

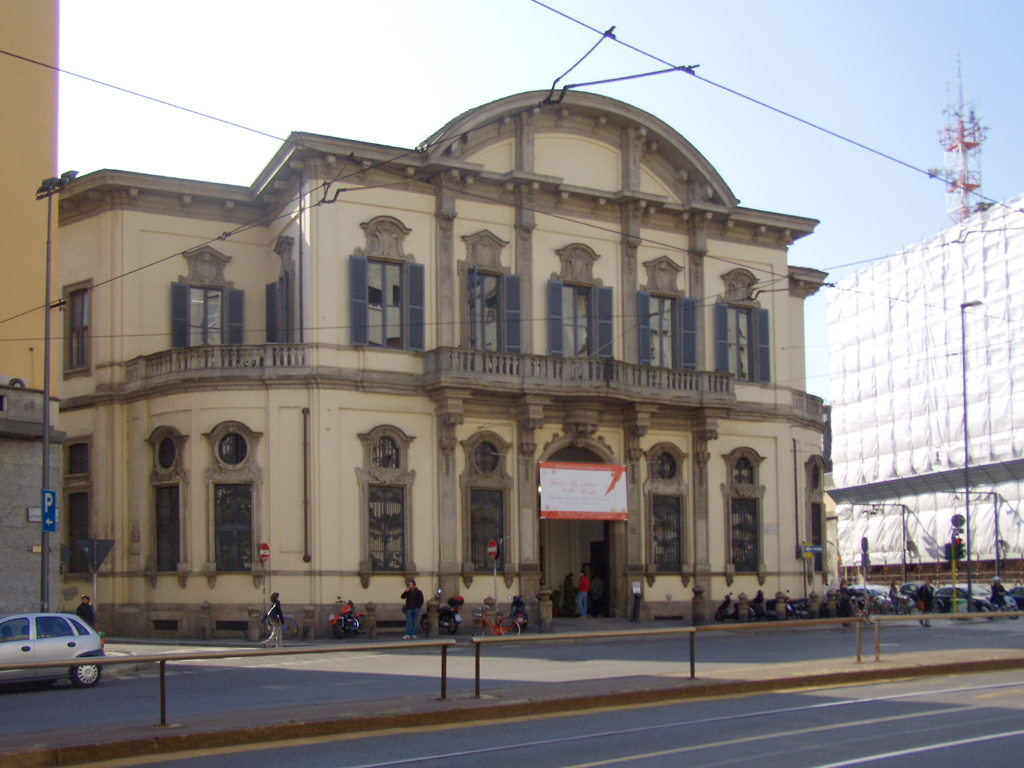
Palazzo Sormani Andreani.

=== 18th century ===
- Casa Berchet
- Casa Buzzoni
- Casa Monti (Via G. Verdi)
- Palazzo Belgiojoso d'Este (Piazza Belgiojoso)
- Palazzo Beccaria
- Palazzo Citterio
- Palazzo Clerici
- Palazzo Confalonieri
- Palazzo Fagnani
- Palazzo Gallarati-Scotti
- Palazzo Greppi
- Palazzo Litta-Cusani (Corso Europa)
- Palazzo Mellerio
- Palazzo Morando-Attendolo-Bolognini (Via S. Andrea, 6)
- Palazzo Moriggia (Via Borgonuovo, 23), today the Museum of the Risorgimento
- Palazzo Reale
- Palazzo Serbelloni (Corso Venezia)
- Palazzo Sormani Andreani
- Palazzo Taverna, via Montenapoleone

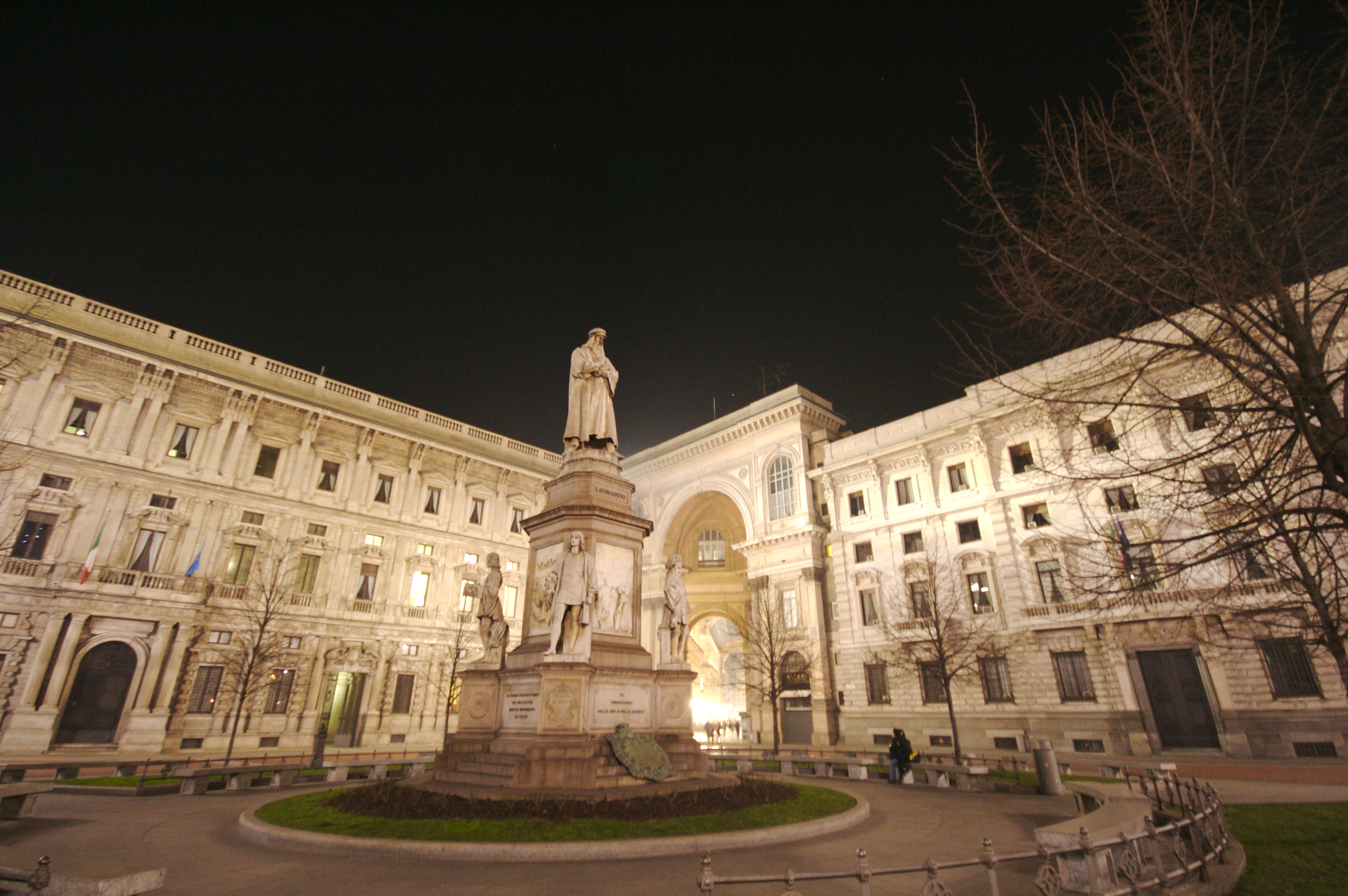
The Palazzo Marino.

- Palazzo Toscanini
- Palazzo Trivulzio
- Palazzo Visconti di Grazzano

=== 19th century ===
- Ca de' Facc (Piazza Baiamonti, 3)
- Ca' de Sass (sede della Banca Cariplo)
- Casa Dell'Acqua
- Casa Alesina (Via Cappuccio, 11)
- Casa Bettoni or dei Bersaglieri (Corso di Porta Romana, 20)
- Casa Borella (Via Berchet 2, junction Via San Raffaele and Via U. Foscolo)
- Casa Bosi Pelitti (Via Castelfidardo, 10)
- Casa Bottelli (Via Dante, 12)
- Casa Broggi
- Ca' Brutta
- Casa Candiani (Via G.B. Vico, 20)
- Casa Castini (Via Dante 4, corner Via S. Prospero)
- Casa Celesia (Via Dante, 7)
- Casa Chicchieri (Via Dante, corner Via San Tommaso)
- Casa Ciani (Corso Venezia, corner Via Boschetti)
- Casa Dell'Acqua (Piazza Castello 27)
- Casa Fasoli (Via Torino, 50)
- Casa Gadda-Portaluppi (Piazza Castello 20, corner Via Lanza 5)
- Casa Grondona (Corso Italia 57, corner Via San Martino)
- Casa Manzoni (Via Morone 1 / Piazza Belgiojoso)
- Casa Negri (Corso di Porta Romana)
- Casa Pirovano (Via Giulini 2, corner with Via Dante)
- Casa and Museo Poldi-Pezzoli (Via Manzoni 12-14)
- Casa Reininghaus
- Casa Rigamonti (Via Solferino, 24-24a)
- Casa Rossi (Corso Magenta, 12)
- Casa Sardi (Via Paleocapa, 3)
- Casa Sartorelli (Via San Raffaele, 4)
- Palazzo Anguissola Antona Traversi (Via Manzoni)
- Palazzo Archinto
- Palazzo & Museum Bagatti-Valsecchi (Via Santo Spirito 7)
- Palazzo della Banca d'Italia
- Palazzo Barozzi
- Palazzo Belgiojoso-Besana (Piazza Belgiojoso)
- Palazzo Beltrami
- Palazzo Bonacosa (Via Q. Sella 4 / Piazza Castello)
- Palazzo Borgazzi
- Palazzo Brentani (Via Manzoni, 6)
- Palazzo Cagnola
- Palazzo Carcano-Tondani
- Palazzo Chiesa
- Palazzo Diotti also known as "Palazzo della prefettura"
- Palazzo Ercole Turati (Via Meravigli, 11)
- Palazzo Francesco Turati (Via Meravigli, 7-9)
- Palazzo Haas (Via U. Foscolo, 1-3)
- Palazzo dell'ex Kursaal Diana
- Palazzo Luraschi (Corso Buenos Aires 1 / Piazza Oberdan)
- Melzi d'Eril
- Palazzo del Museo di Scienze Naturali (Corso Venezia, 55)
- Palazzo della Permanente (Via Turati, 34)
- Palazzo Porro-Lambertenghi (Via Monte di Pietà)
- Palazzo Rusconi-Clerici (Piazza Castello, 16)
- Palazzo Saporiti
- Palazzo Savonelli (Via Dante, piazza Cordusio, Via Broletto, Via S. Prospero 1)
- Palazzo Serbelloni
- Palazzo Spinola
- Palazzo della Società per le Strade Ferrate del Mediterraneo
- Palazzo Talenti (Via G. Verdi)
- Palazzo Tarsis (Via S. Paolo)
- Palazzo Taverna
- Palazzo Torelli-Viollier (Via Paleocapa 4-6, corner Via Jacini)
- Palazzo della Veneranda Fabbrica del Duomo
- Villa Belgiojoso-Bonaparte or Royal Villa of Milan

=== 20th century ===
- Ca' Brutta
- Casa Apostolo
- Casa Campanini
- Casa Cambiaghi
- Casa Ferrario
- Casa Galimberti
- Casa Guazzoni
- Casa Laugier
- Casa Morganti
- Casa Piana (Via Sant'Ambrogio 29, corner with Via Lanzone)
- Castello Cova
- Palazzo Berri-Meregalli
- Palazzo Bolchini
- Palazzo Castiglioni (Corso Venezia)
- Palazzo Civita
- Palazzo Crespi
- Palazzo Cusini
- Palazzo di Giustizia
- Palazzo del cinema Odeon
- Palazzo del Toro
- Palazzo del Touring Club Italiano
- Palazzo dell'Arte
- Palazzo della Banca Commerciale Italiana
- Palazzo della Banca d'Italia
- Palazzo della Banca di Roma
- Palazzo della Banca Popolare di Milano
- Palazzo della ex Borsa
- Palazzo della Rinascente
- Palazzo della Società Reale Mutua di Assicurazioni
- Palazzo Galmanini Portaluppi (viale Beatrice d'Este 23)
- Palazzo Fidia
- Palazzo Meroni
- Palazzo Mezzanotte, seat of the Borsa d'Italia
- Palazzo Veronesi
- Torre Rasini
- Torre San Babila
- Torre Velasca
- Villa Necchi Campiglio
- Villino Calabresi (Via XX Settembre)
- Villino Gotico (Via Cernaia)
- Villino Hoepli (Via XX Settembre)

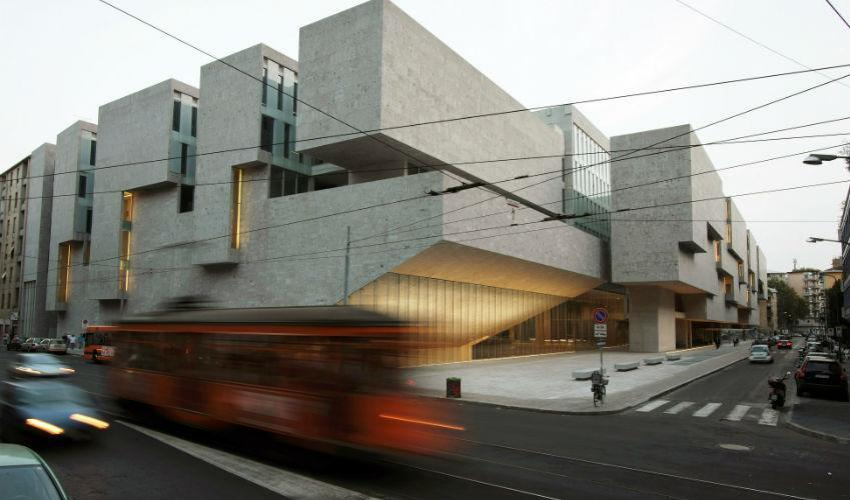
Palazzo Roentgen in Viale Bligny 1, designed by the Grafton studio by Yvonne Farrell and Shelley McNamara

==== 50s ====
Among the buildings in Milan's building history, those belonging to the MAC Movement - Concrete Art Movement and to Italian rationalism, designed by renowned designers, are of international interest, due to their historical and artistic value.

- The Abstract House (Milan) (Viale Beatrice d'Este 24)
- Palace Galmanini Portaluppi, by Gualtiero Galmanini and Piero Portaluppi, (Viale Beatrice d'Este 23)
- Casa Caccia Dominioni (piazza S.Ambrogio, 16)
- Casa della Meridiana, by Giuseppe de Finetti, (via Marchiondi, 3)

=== 21st century ===
- Edificio Roentgen or Edificio Grafton, (via Guglielmo Roentgen, 1)

== Sources ==
- I palazzi della vecchia Milano G.C. Bascapé, Ulrico Hoepli Editore, Milano, 1986
- Milano di terracotta e mattoni O.P. Melano, Mazzotta Editore, Milano, 2002
