= Simone Cantoni =

Swiss Neoclassical architect (1739–1818)

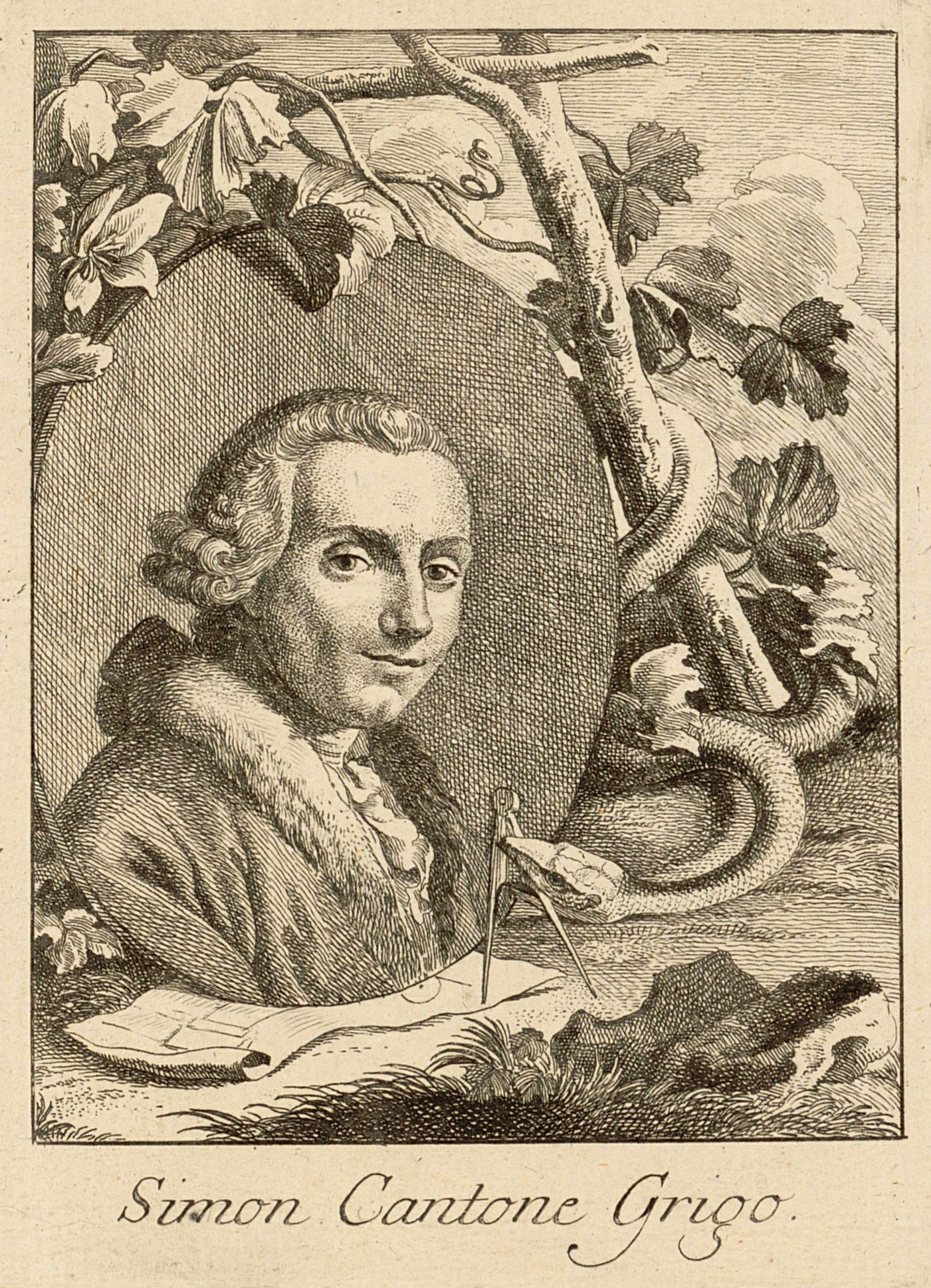
- Portrait of Simone Cantoni (1774)
- Born: 2 September 1739; Muggio, Ticino, Switzerland
- Died: 3 March 1818 (aged 78); Gorgonzola, Kingdom of Lombardy–Venetia, Austrian Empire
- Occupation: Architect
- Movement: Neoclassicism
- Buildings: Villa Olmo; Villa Gallarati-Scotti; Villa Raimondi; Palazzo Serbelloni

Simone Cantoni (2 September 1739 – 3 March 1818) was a Swiss architect of the Neoclassical period, active mainly in Northern Italy.

Among his many works are the Villa Olmo in Como, Villa Cigalini in Bornate, Villa Giovia in Brescia, Villa Gallarati-Scotti in Oreno, Villa Muggiasca in Masino, Villa Raimondi in Fino Mornasco, and the Palazzo Serbelloni in Milan.

== Biography ==
=== Early life and education ===
Cantoni came from a family of artists and architects who worked in Genoa. His father (Pietro Lorenzo Cantoni) was his first mentor, but sent him as a young man to Rome to study classical architecture. He worked there in the studio of Luigi Vanvitelli. He received a prize from the Academy of Parma in 1764 and surveyed ancient Roman remains with Francesco La Vega. He completed his studies in 1768 at the new academy at Parma under Ennemond Alexandre Petitot. He built extensively in Lombardy and contributed to the introduction of Neoclassicism into Milan.

=== Early career ===
Cantoni chose to establish himself in Milan in 1768, rather than in Genoa like his family, but he was faced with strong competition from Giuseppe Piermarini, who eventually took over all the official commissions of the period. Cantoni found patronage among the Milanese nobility, for whom he built numerous palazzi and villas in and around Milan in the fashionable Neoclassical style. His first commission in Milan was for the renovation of the Palazzo Mellerio in central Milan (1772–4). The commission for the Palazzo Serbelloni (1775–1814), built in a resolutely Neoclassical style, occupied Cantoni for the rest of his life. The façade comprises fifteen bays and three storeys; the three central bays project slightly and feature a pedimented loggia of free-standing Ionic columns, which occupies the two upper floors. There is a bas-relief frieze above the piano nobile and a lunette forming another loggia in the tympanum. The building was chosen for the reception of Napoleon in Milan in 1796.

Cantoni also designed the cemetery and other small buildings in Gorgonzola in a restrained Neoclassical style for the Serbelloni family. Cantoni’s only official commission was for the renovation (1778–83) of the façade and salon of the Doge's Palace, Genoa, for which he presented a speculative competition entry in 1778. The façade is in seven bays over a rusticated basement, with three central projecting bays; there are paired engaged columns on the two lower floors, Doric below and Ionic above.

=== Later career ===
By the end of the 18th century Cantoni had established himself and thereafter never lacked commissions: in a letter of 1794 he listed 21 works in progress. In his later years he travelled extensively between Milan, Como, Bergamo and Ticino; among his most important works of the period are the enormous Neoclassical church (1781–1832) at Porto Maurizio; the Palazzo Vailetti (1783–91), Bergamo; the Palazzo Pertusati (1789–91), Milan, arranged around a garden courtyard like a Parisian hôtel; the staircase and courtyard of the Palazzo Affaitati (1794), Cremona; and the Villa Olmo (1780–94), Como.

The Villa Olmo incorporated Palladian elements within a severe Neoclassical framework, notably the colonnade of six engaged Ionic columns above a rusticated ground-floor. His last work was the church of Santi Protasio e Gervasio (1818), Gorgonzola, based on an earlier design of 1802. The church is centrally planned and was possibly based on Francesco Borromini’s Sant'Agnese (1653) in the Piazza Navona, Rome; a wide porch ends in pedimented pavilions that dwarf the central portico.

== Selected works ==
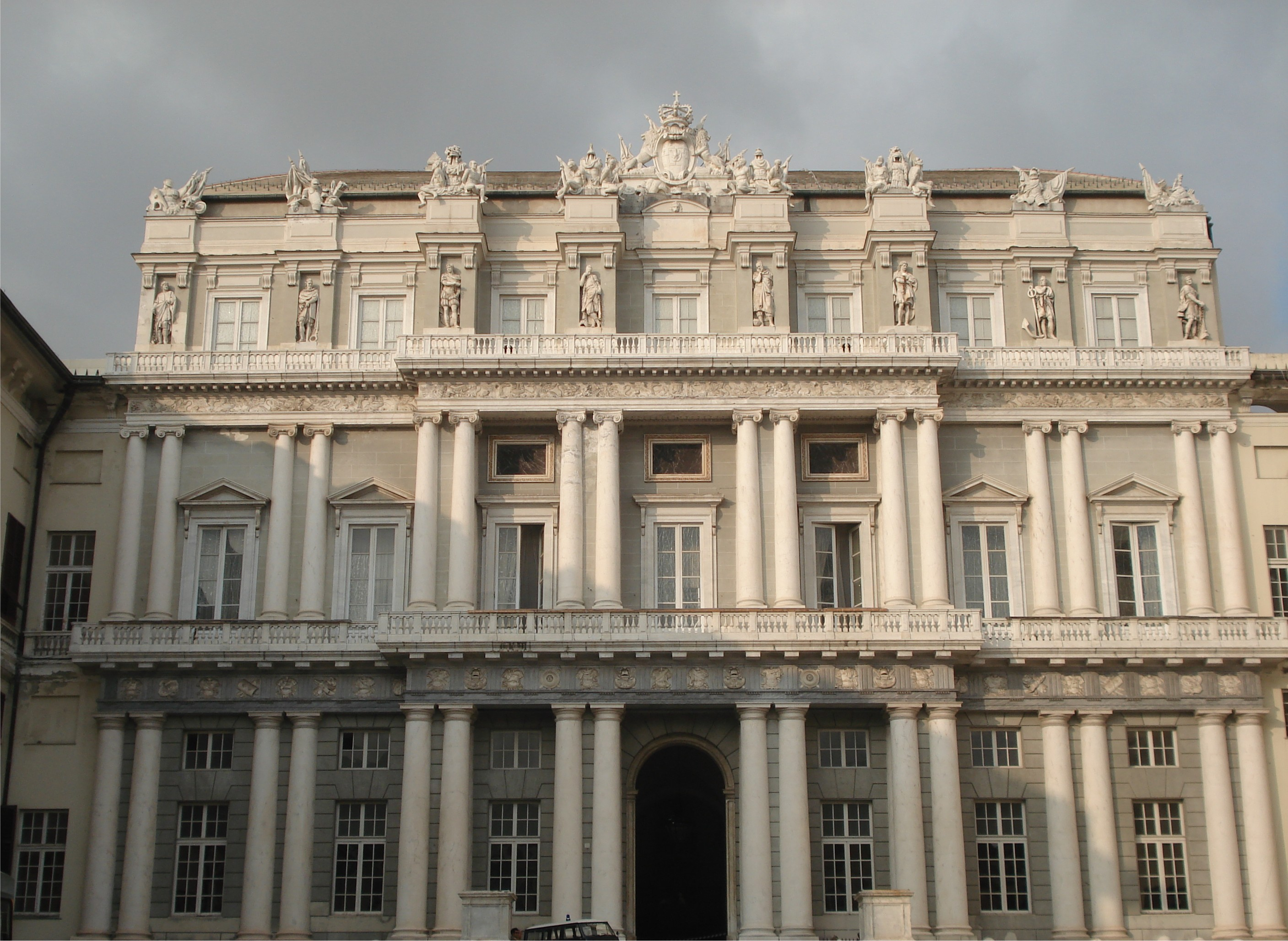
Façade of the Doge's Palace, Genoa

- Doge's Palace, Genoa
- Chiesa prepositurale dei Santi Gervaso e Protaso, Gorgonzola
- Villa Violini Nogarola, Castel d'Azzano, Verona
- Chiesa dei Santi Vito e Modesto, Lomazzo, Como
- Chiesa parrocchiale dei Santi Ambrogio e Simpliciano, Carate Brianza, Milan
- Villa Giovio, Breccia, Como
- Villa Meda, Canzo, Como
- Chiesa Parrocchiale di Santa Maria Annunciata, Ponte Lambro, Como
- Villa Olmo, Como
- Villa Orrigoni Litta Modignani, Varese
- Villa Cigalini, Bernate, Como
- Villa Mugiasca, Como
- Palazzo Pertusati, Milan
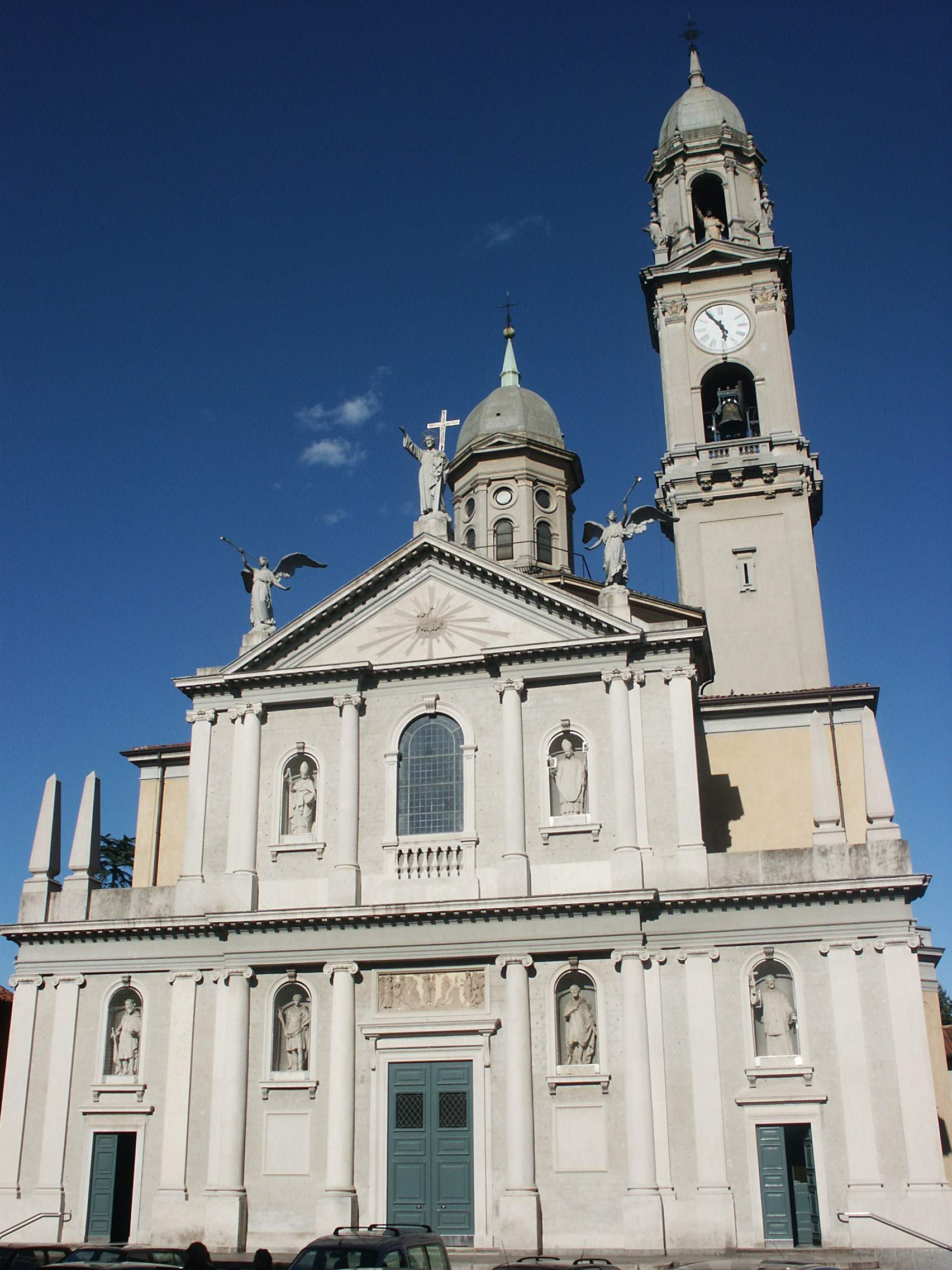
San Vito, Lomazzo

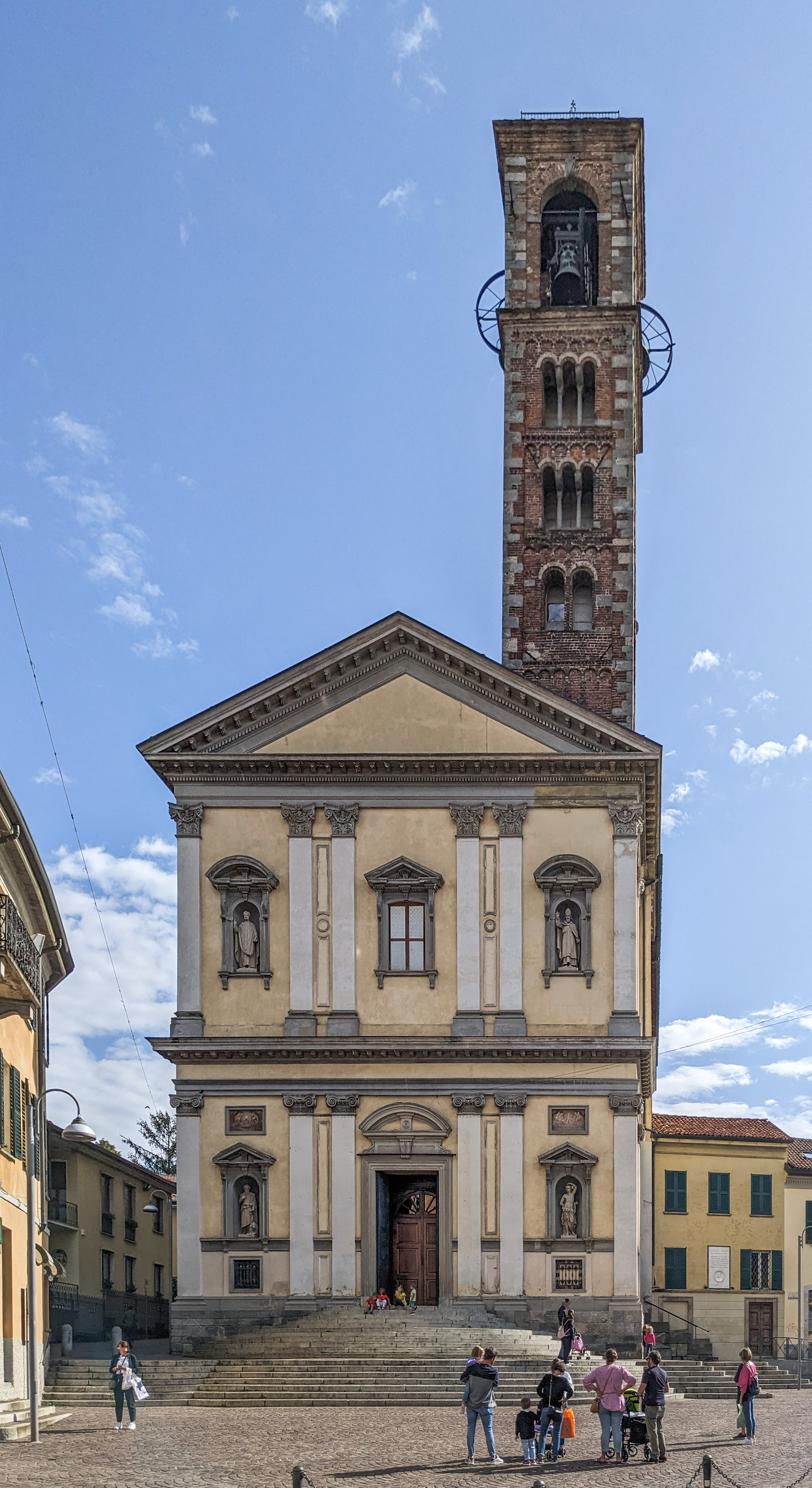
Santi Ambrogio e Simpliciano, Carate Brianza

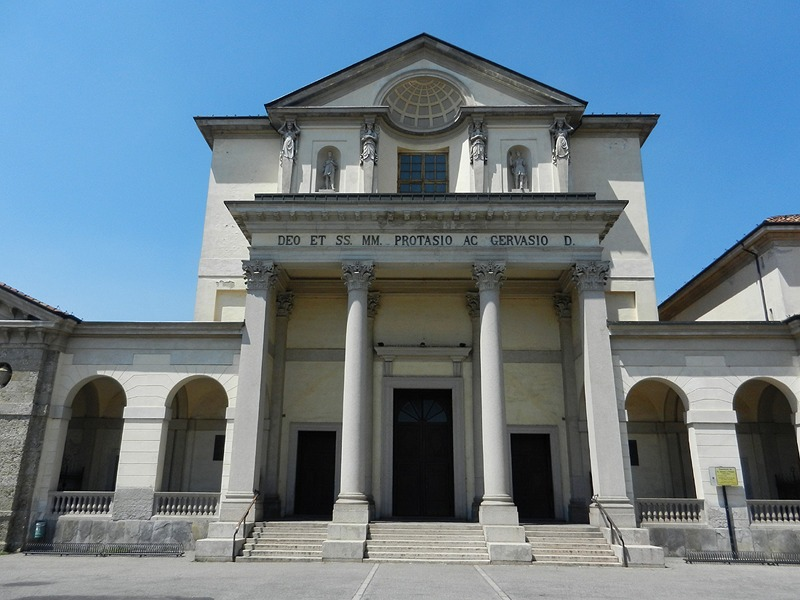
Santi Gervaso e Protaso, Gorgonzola

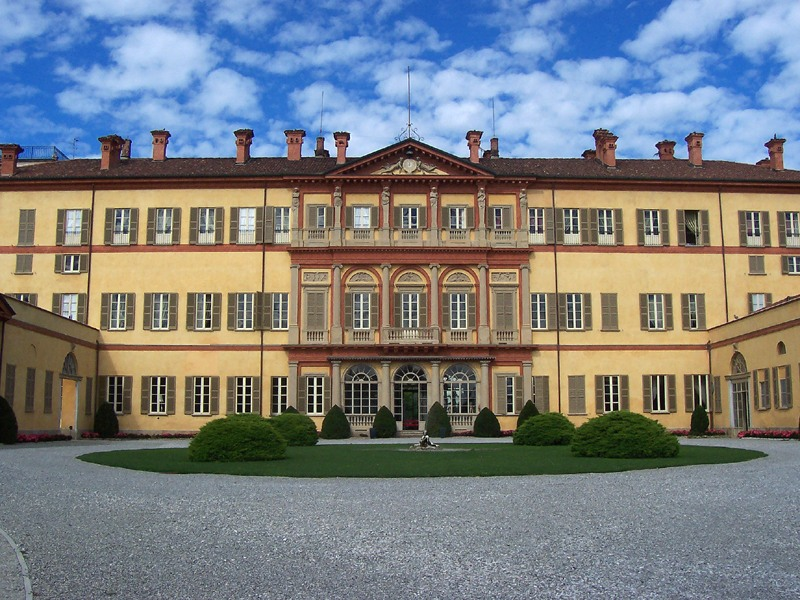
Villa Gallarati-Scotti, Oreno

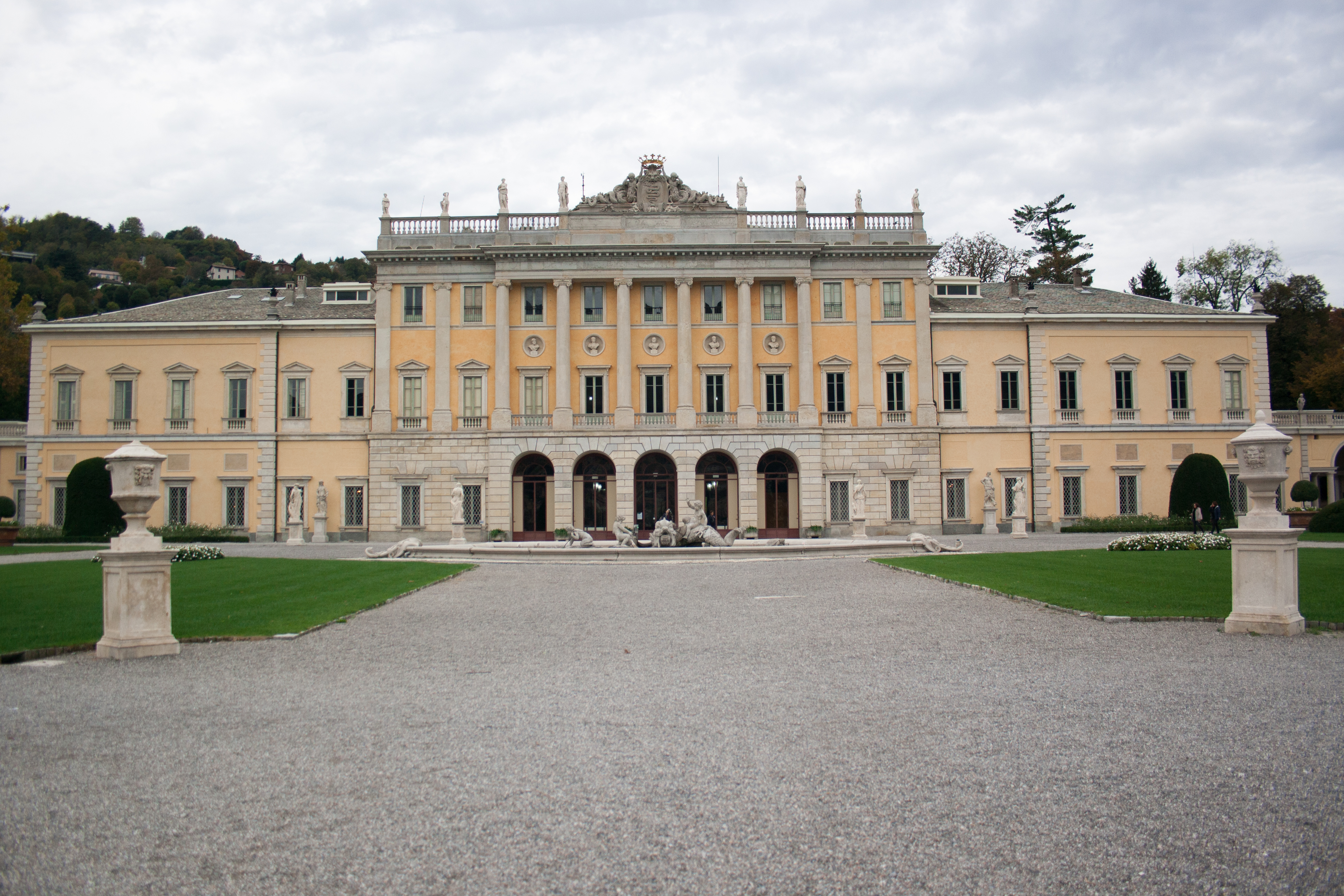
Villa Olmo, Como

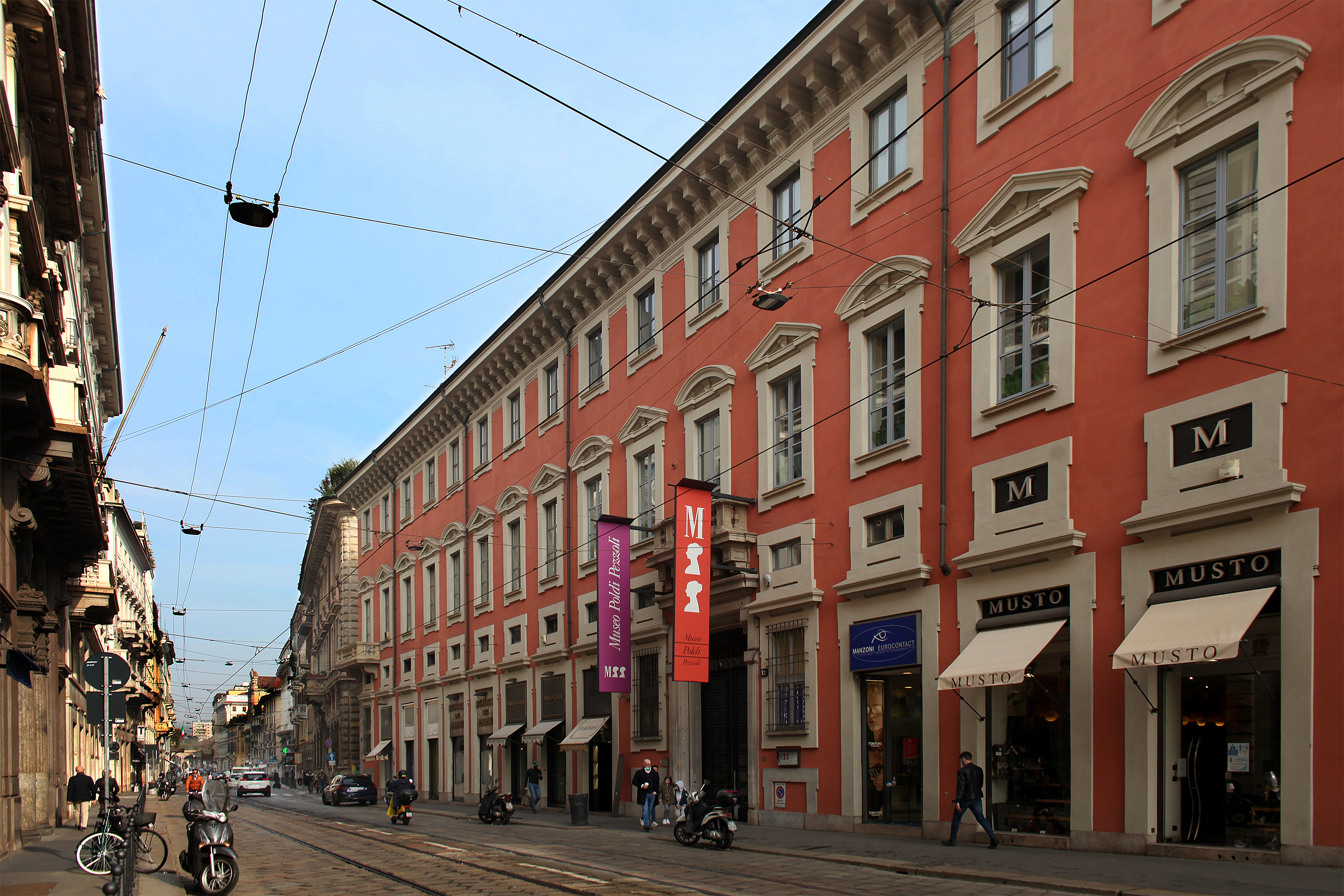
Palazzo Moriggia Della Porta, Milan
