= Mellerio (disambiguation) =

André Mellerio (1862–1943) was a French art critic.

Mellerio may also refer to:

- Mellerio dits Meller, a French jewellery house
- Palazzo Mellerio, Milan, a late-baroque-style palace in Milan
