= Villa Olmo =

Villa in Como, Italy

Coordinates: 45°49′8.53″N 9°3′55.53″E

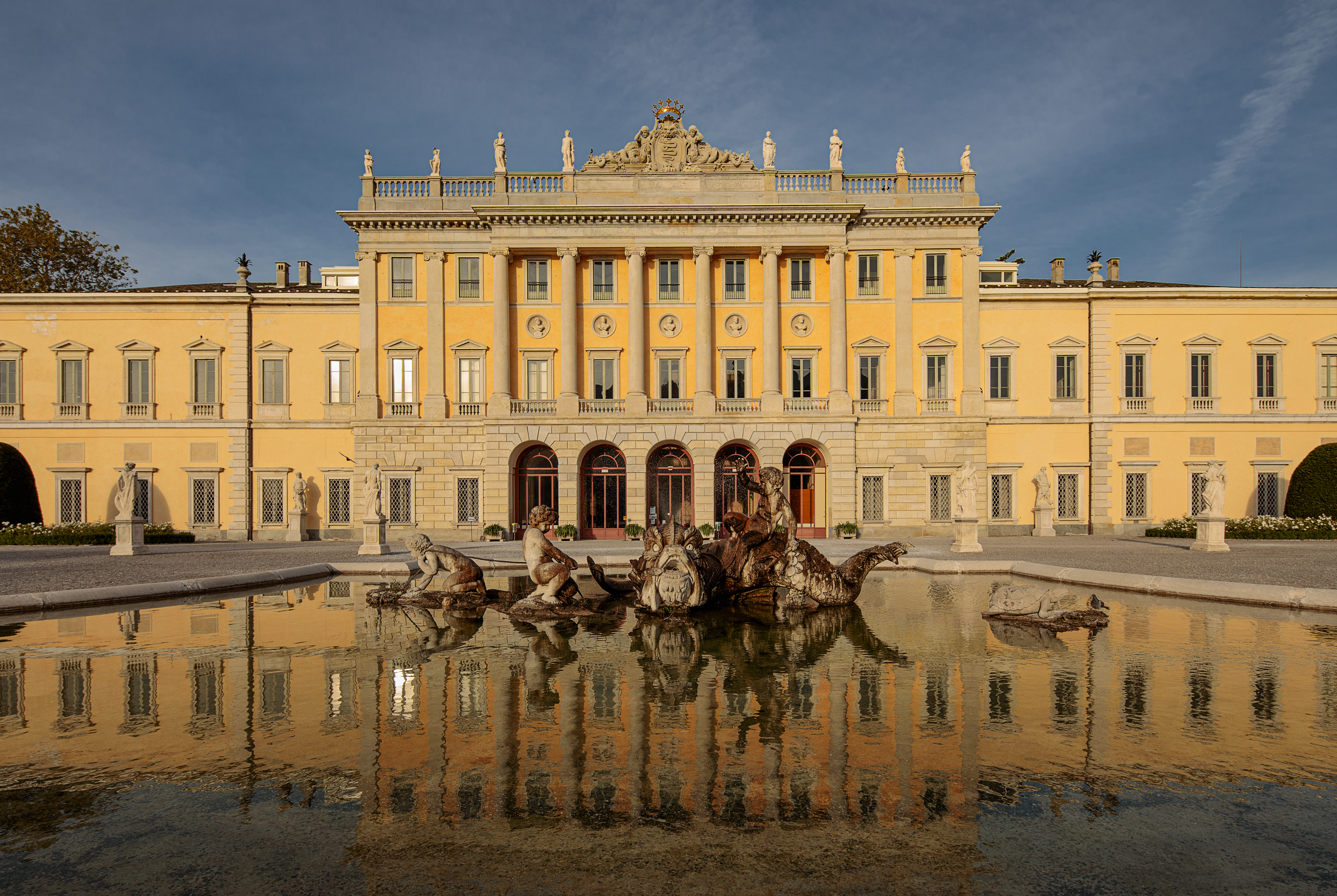
- Interactive map of the Villa Olmo area

General information
- Architectural style: Neoclassical
- Location: Como, Italy
- Construction started: 1797
- Owner: City of Como

Design and construction
- Architect: Simone Cantoni

Villa Olmo is a neoclassical villa located in the city of Como, northern Italy.

The villa was commissioned by Marquis Innocenzo Odescalchi to Swiss architect Simone Cantoni to have a summer retreat alongside the lake in 1782. Works started in 1797 and were completed in 1812. The villa was named after an elm tree, no longer alive today, planted in the middle of the ornate gardens. About 800 varieties of trees still grow here.

The villa was acquired in 1924 by the municipality of Como and today is open to the public only during exhibitions, while the lakeside gardens are freely accessible during the daytime.

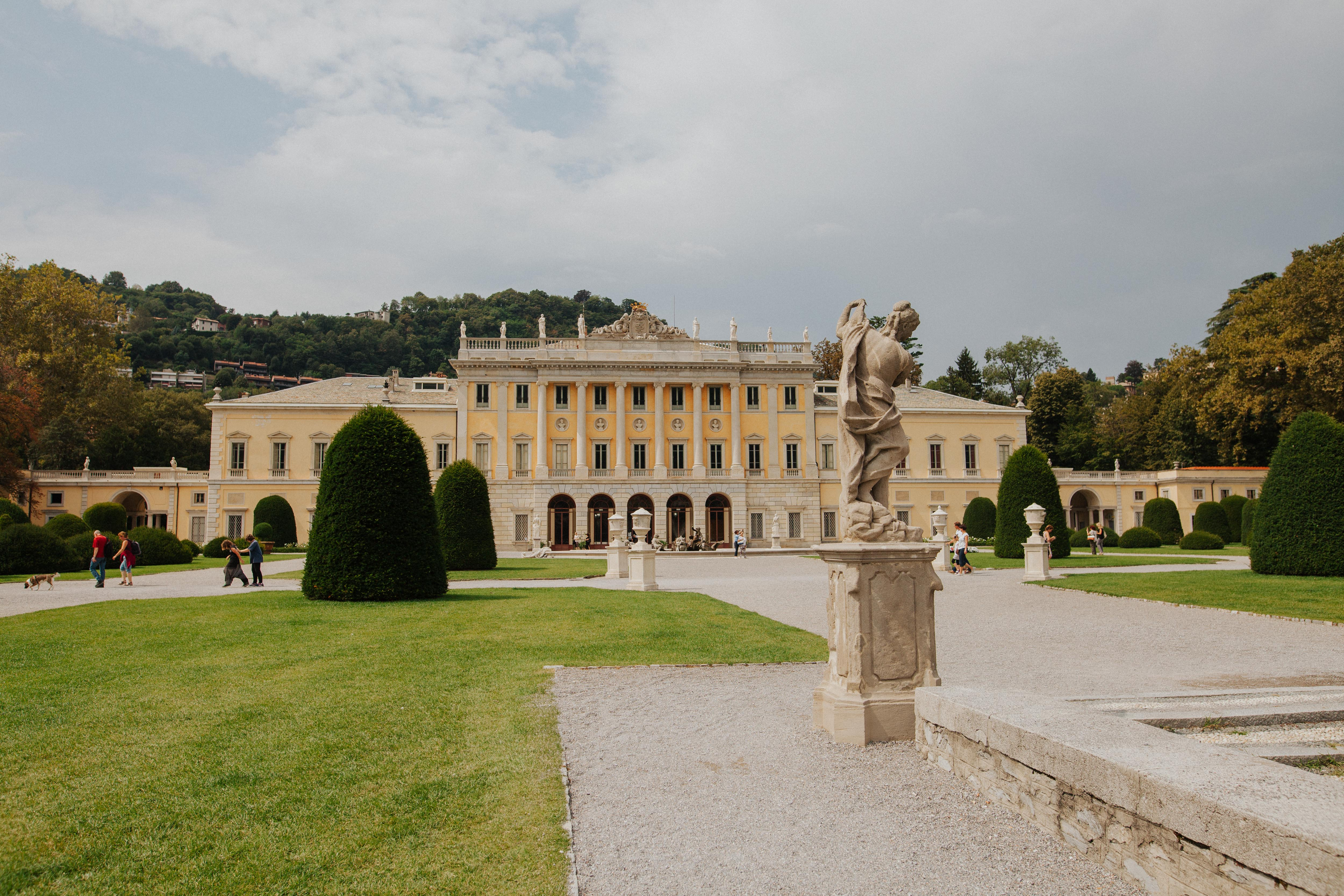
View of Villa Olmo from the garden

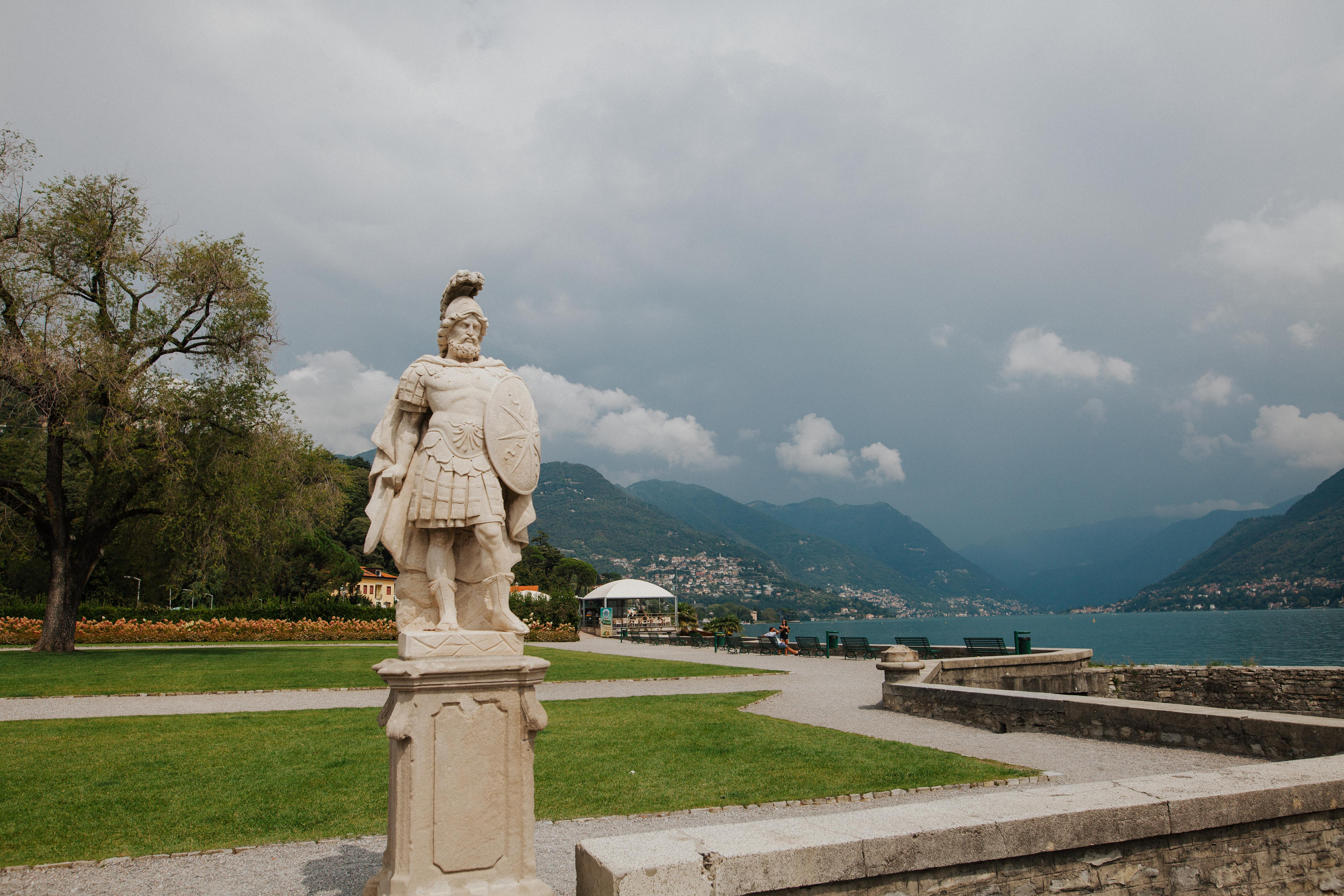
View from Villa Olmo on the lake

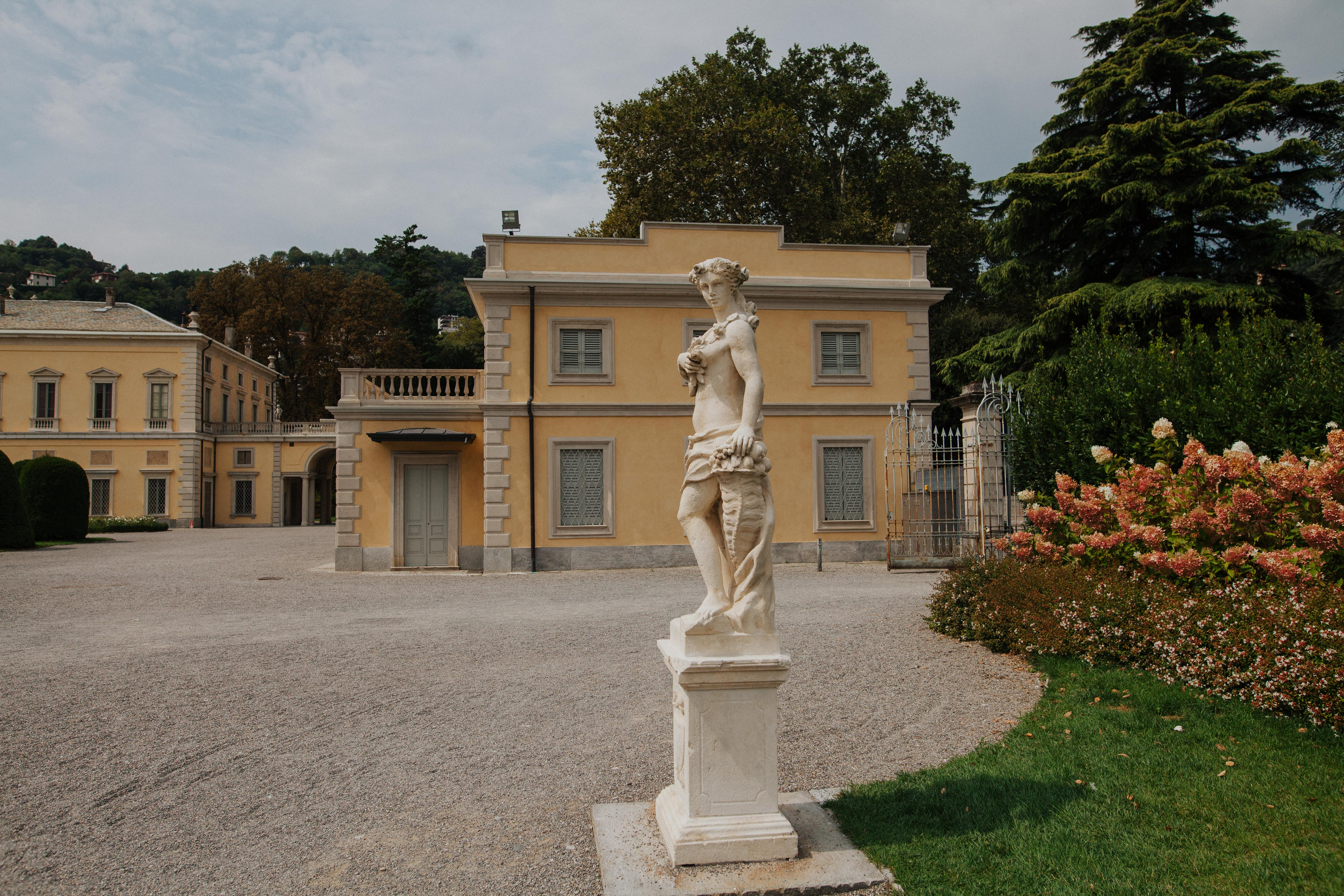
Partial view of the garden

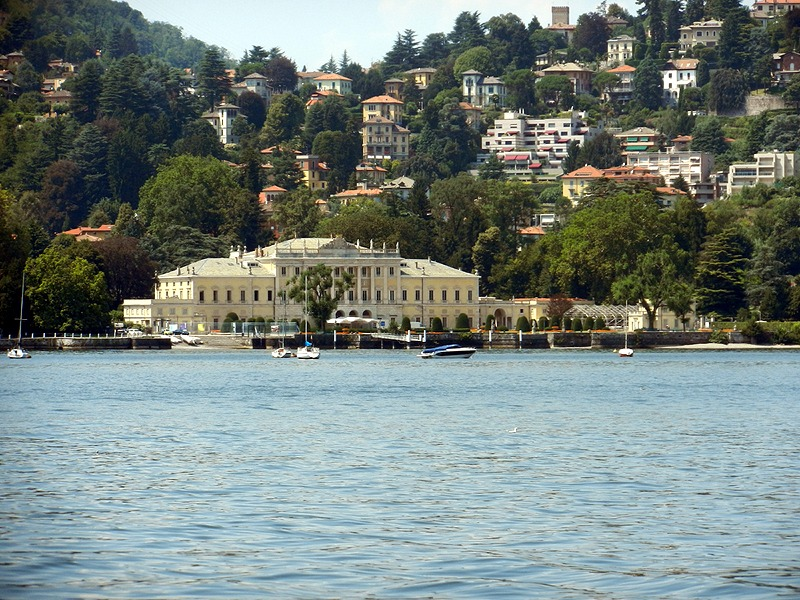
The villa seen from the lake

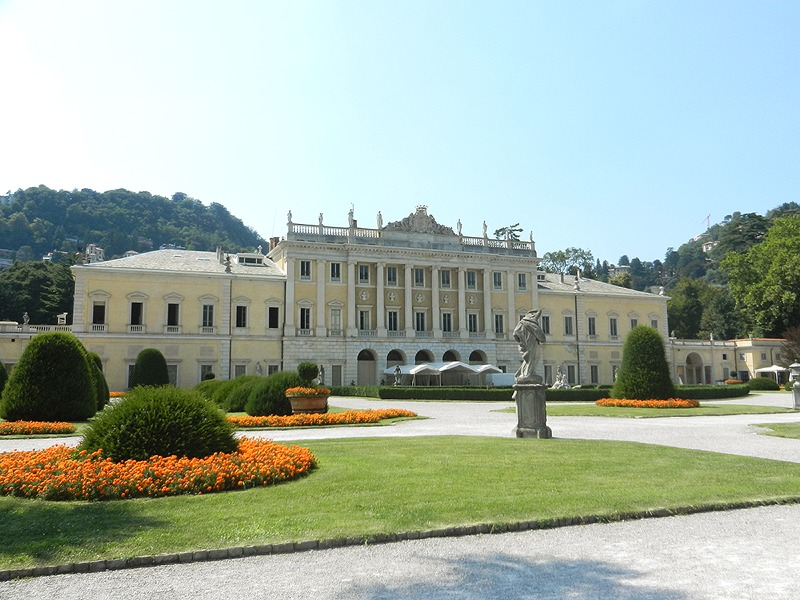
The villa and garden in July 2012

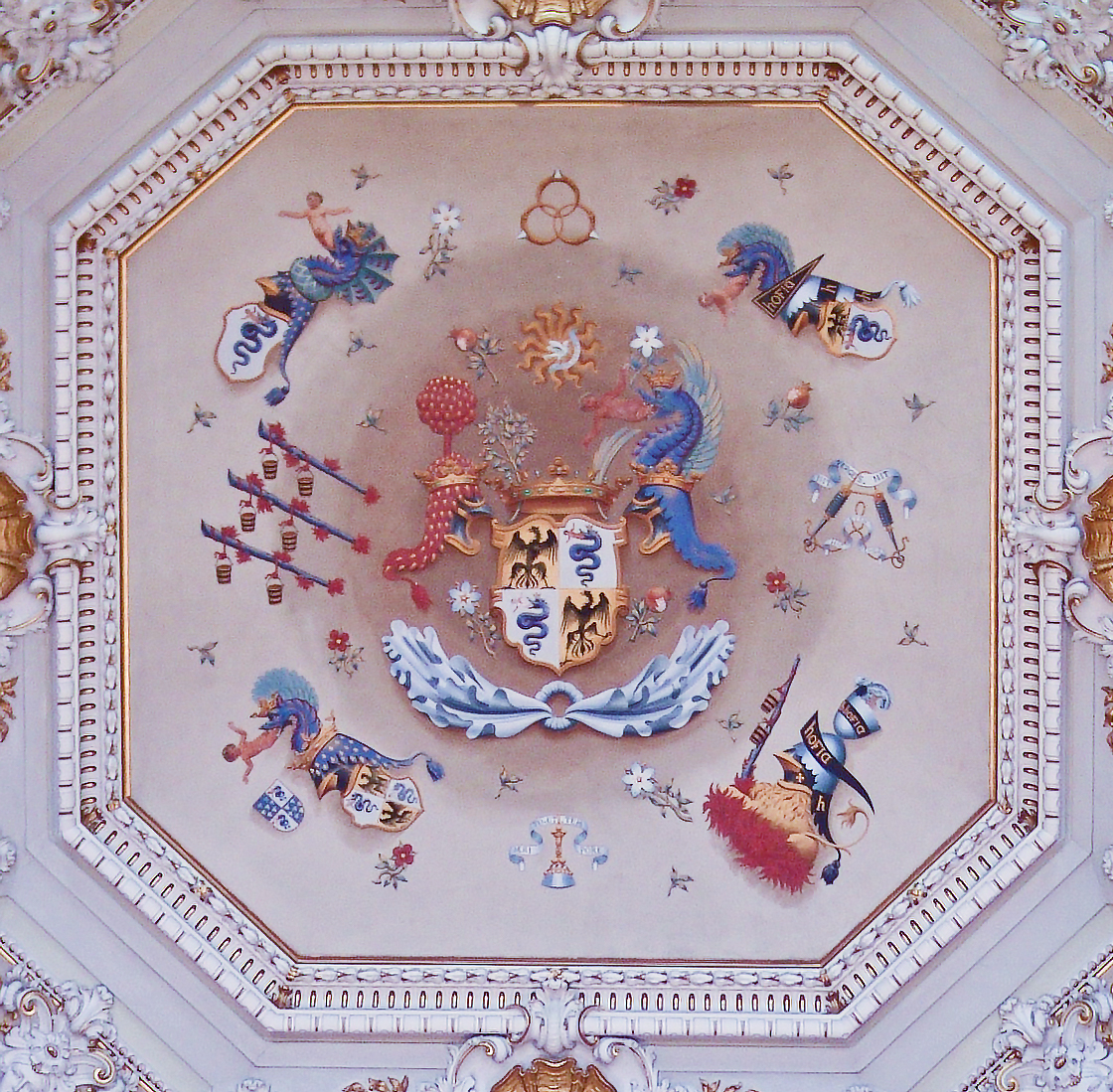
Ceiling at the entrance

== See also ==
- Villa del Balbianello
- Villa Bernasconi
- Villa Carlotta
- Villa Erba
- Villa d'Este, Cernobbio
- Villa Melzi
- Villa Monastero
- Villa Serbelloni
- Villa Vigoni
