= Villa Raimondi, Fino Mornasco =

Coordinates: 45°44′28″N 9°02′59″E

The Villa Raimondi, also known over the centuries as Villa Tagliaferri or Isacco or Odescalchi, is a 19th-century rural palace located on Viale Raimondi #54, just outside the town of Fino Mornasco, Province of Como, Lombardy, Italy.

== History ==
The original building dates to 17th-18th centuries, although the remains of a tower point to earlier construction. The property belonged to the Odescalchi family of Como since 1600. The Odescalchi family's most prominent member was Pope Innocent XI in the late 17th century, who frequented this site. In 1801, they commissioned a Neoclassical refurbishment from Simone Cantoni. The villa had medieval towers added.

Upon the death in 1824 of Innocenzo Odescalchi, the villa was inherited by the Marchese Giorgio Raimondi. The Marchese hosted Giuseppe Garibaldi. In 1860, on the chapel on the grounds, Garibaldi wed the Marchese's daughter, Giuseppina Raimondi. However, after the ceremony she informed him that she was pregnant with the child of her lover Luigi Caroli, and Garibaldi immediately spurned her.

The villa became property of the Malnati, then the Isacco family, and finally by the 1930s, property of the wealthy businessman Leone Tagliaferri. His grandsons sold the villa to developers.

Since 1980, the property was acquired by the Region of Lombardy and maintained by the Fondazione Minoprio. The grounds include a library and school, and an agricultural center.
