= Villa Gallarati Scotti, Vimercate =

Coordinates: 45.6183°N 9.3545°E

The Villa Gallarati Scotti is a rural palace located near the town of Vimercate, in the Province of Monza and Brianza, in the Region of Lombardy, Italy.

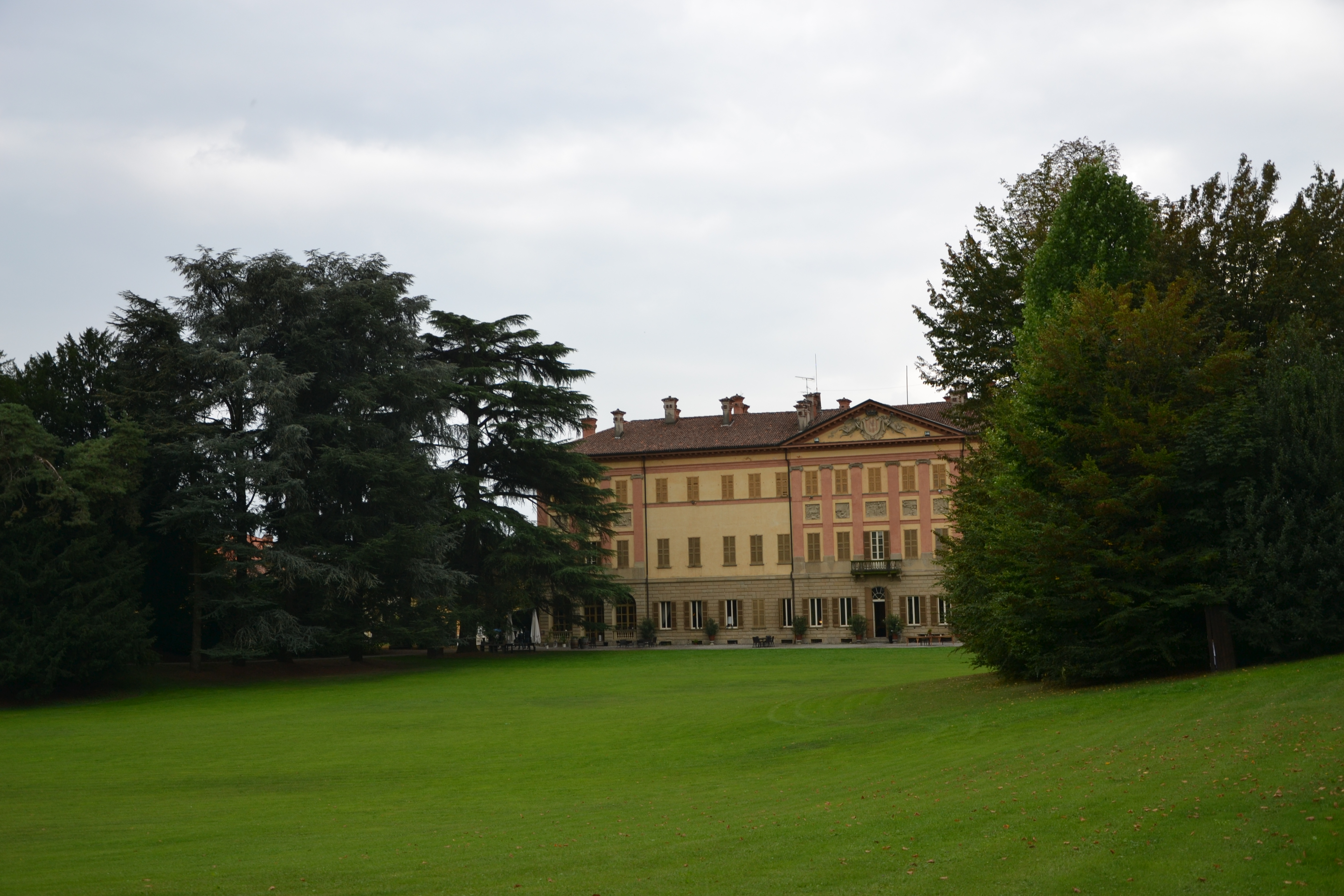
Villa Gallarati Scotti (north face, by internal park)

The villa, also known as Villa di Oreno, was built initially in 1685 by Giovanni Battista Scotti, Conte di Colturano. It was one of the villas engraved by Marcantonio Dal Re in his book about contemporary villas di delizia (Ville di Lombardia) near Milan.

The villa underwent Neoclassic style reconstruction in the end of the 18th and start of the 19th century by the architect Simone Cantoni. The facade was added a large clock face. The surrounding gardens were arrayed in parterres, and contained a Nymphaeum of Neptune (1720–1721) with a waterfall fountain. The latter was admired by the French scholar Montesquieu in 1728. Later, during the renovation works the garden changed style too. It was originally based on the French style, it featured statues, fountains, and a tree-lined venue. After the renovation it adopted the newer emerging English style, it was enlarged, the bushes were chopped and replaced by a large plain of grass surrounded by tall trees.

The interior was decorated with various frescoes from the 17th century, including a Hall of Alexander the Great with frescoed scenes depicting: Alexander tames Bucephalus; Alexander and the Gordian Knot, Alexander wounded at Tarsus, Alexander at Issus. The ceiling has allegorical figures including The Pardon, Love of Country, Abundance, Victory and Strength. While the artists have not been identified, they have been attributed to either Pietro Maggi, Giovanni Battista Sassi, Francesco Bianchi (painter), or Giovanni Battista Castellino.

In 1845, Duke Tomaso Gallarati Scotti commissioned works from Gioacchino Crivelli, and later from Franco Ruggeri.

The duke Tommaso was followed by his son G. Carlo, prince of Molfetta. Carlo, who was very interested in natural sciences and bred animals in the Garden of the villa, it is known that he once performed with a bear for charity.

The villa Gallarate Scotti was affected by the two world wars as well. During the first war G. Carlo himself made it available as a rehabilitation center for the injured soldiers, during the second war, the villa was confiscated and used for military purposes. At the end of the war, it was G. Giacomo Gallarate Scotti, the heir of G. Carlo, who refurbished the villa and completed the works to restore it.
