= Palazzo Luraschi, Milan =

The Palazzo Luraschi is a 19th-century palace located on Corso Buenos Aires #1 in Milan, region of Lombardy, Italy.

== History ==
The palace was commissioned by the engineer Luraschi, once administrator of the Lazzaretto of Milan, employed by the Ospedale Maggiore of Milan. He employed Angelo Galimberti to design the building in 1887, and in the courtyard used columns derived from the former Lazzaretto. The building was intended to house businesses on the ground floor, including the restaurant Puntignam (1888–1940). The exterior is rich in balconies and rough-hewn stone. The courtyard has medallions from Alessandro Manzoni's novel The Betrothed, of which a major scene occurs in the Lazzaretto.
