= Vimercate =

Vimercate Vimercaa (Lombard)
- Comune
- Città di Vimercate
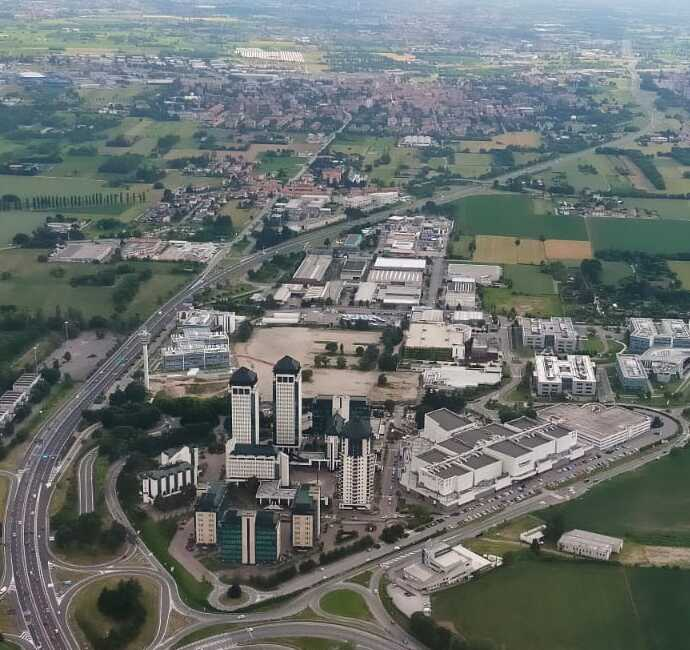
- Areal view

- Coat of arms

- Location within Italy Location within Lombardy
- Coordinates: 45°37′N 9°22′E
- Country: Italy
- Region: Lombardy
- Province: Monza and Brianza (MB)
- Frazioni: Ruginello, Oldaniga, Oreno, Velasca

Government
  - Mayor: Francesco Cereda

Area
  - Total: 20.67 km^{2} (7.98 sq mi)
- Elevation: 194 m (636 ft)

Population (30 November 2017)
  - Total: 26,156
  - Density: 1,265/km^{2} (3,277/sq mi)
- Demonym: Vimercatesi
- Time zone: UTC+1 (CET)
  - Summer (DST): UTC+2 (CEST)
- Postal code: 20871
- Dialing code: 039
- Patron saint: Saint Stephen
- Saint day: 3 August
- Website: Official website

Vimercate (Italian: [vimerˈkaːte]; Brianzöö: Vimercaa, Lombard: [ʋimerˈkaː]) is a comune (municipality) in the province of Monza and Brianza, in the Italian region of Lombardy. It is 25 kilometres (16 mi) from Milan and 10 kilometres (6 mi) from Monza.

Its name (whose first finding dates back to the year 745) derives from the Latin Vicus Mercati, which later became Vicus Mercatum and then Vimercato, the ancient form of Vimercate, used up until the 19th century. It means "market village", since Vimercate was an active trade center.

The city was founded by the Romans on the banks of the river Molgora, and it originally was a Roman castrum (a military camp). The ancient castrum was destroyed in the Middle Ages during the various invasions of the Italian peninsula. Yet, given that since the Roman age the city has kept on growing and evolving, several monuments and artifacts have been built over the course of history and are present to these days, starting from the ancient San Rocco Bridge, originally built by the Romans in the 3rd century, to the Collegiate church of Saint Stephen, consecrated in 1272, and the more recent Villa Gallarati Scotti of the 17th century.

In 1950 Vimercate received the title of "Città" and in 2009 the city was awarded with the "Medaglia d’argento al merito civile" for the role played during the resistance against Fascism.

== Main sights ==
=== Saint Francis Convent (Banfi House) ===
A hostel at the site was founded in 1052, just outside the walls of medieval Vimercate, offering refuge and assistance to travellers and pilgrims. In the first half of the 13th century Franciscan friars from the nearby monastery in Oreno, traditionally believed to have been visited by Saint Francis himself, founded the new Franciscan monastery under the "Custody of Monza". During the 13th century it increased in importance and was occupied by Lectors and Maestri.

In one of the frescoes in the convent is an ornament (circa 1311) showing the coats of arms of the Visconti and Della Torre families. The date is the time when a truce between the two families was signed on Epiphany of that year. The truce between the two Milanese families was guaranteed by Henry VII, Holy Roman Emperor. In 1456 Francesco Sforza, Duke of Milan, provided a special grant with an annual offering of fifty florins, founding the Cappellania di San Francesco (Chapter of the Chapel of Saint Francis) in the church.

In 1798 the monastery, suppressed by the Cisalpine Republic, was purchased in 1799 by the Feudal Mayor of Vimercate, Dr. Giuseppe Banfi. He conceded the use of the monastery to the six remaining friars, supporting them for life. Afterwards he transformed the monastery into a residence. Since then the Banfi family has owned the site.

In different areas of the monastery there are some fragments of frescos, which, even if quite small, make it possible to distinguish two subsequent attempts at decorating the church during the first half of the fourteenth century, evidence of the prestige of the monastery in that period.

=== Other sights ===
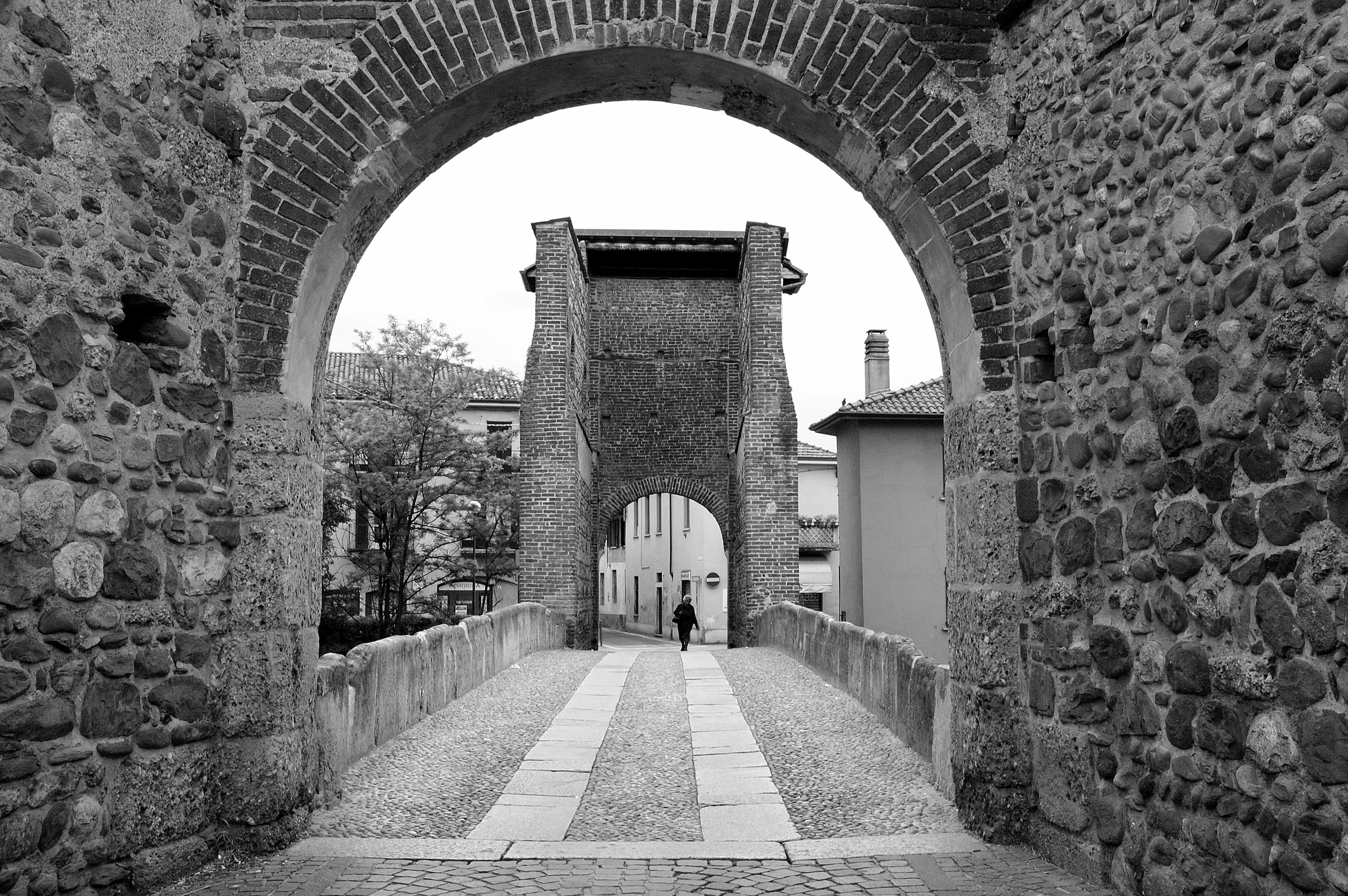
Ponte di San Rocco

- San Rocco Bridge (Ponte di San Rocco, 3rd century), the oldest still-functioning Roman bridge in northern Italy. In the Middle Ages it received two gates.
- Collegiate Church of Saint Stephen (Collegiata di Santo Stefano, 10th century)
- Sanctuary of the Blessed Virgin (Santuario della Beata Vergine del Rosario). The church was erected in the 17th century and is famous for a miracle: during the plague of the year 1630, the statue of the Virgin Mary came to life and blessed the city; from that day the plague in Vimercate ended.
- Palazzo Trotti. The building dates back to 17th century and belonged to the Trotti family until 1862, when it was bought by the municipality of Vimercate. It has 18th-century paintings by Giuseppe Antonio Felice Orelli.
- Villa Sottocasa (late 18th century). This villa hosted King Victor Emmanuel II for three years.

The area of Oreno has maintained its medieval look with an 11th-century monastery, Saint Michael's Church and the stately homes Villa Gallarati Scotti and Villa Borromeo.

The town has more new developments such as the Torri Bianche skyscrapers which host a 16 screen cinema, a shopping arcade and many county offices plus the new Central Bus Station in Piazza Guglielmo Marconi designed by Mario Botta in 1998, which serves the area and has many facilities.

On the east side of the city rises the "Centro Scolastico Omnicomprensivo", a scholastic centre, which is known for the quality and high standards of the "Licei" (High Schools). Particularly renowned is the Scientific and Classic Liceo "Antonio Banfi". Within the communal borders there are many parks, used for concerts and shows.

== People ==
- Salaì (1480–1524), artist and pupil of Leonardo da Vinci
- Matteo Morandi (1981), gymnast, 2012 Olympic bronze medalist on still rings
- Emis Killa (1989), rapper.
