= Palazzo Serbelloni =

Palace in Milan, Italy

Coordinates: 45°28′09″N 9°11′59″E

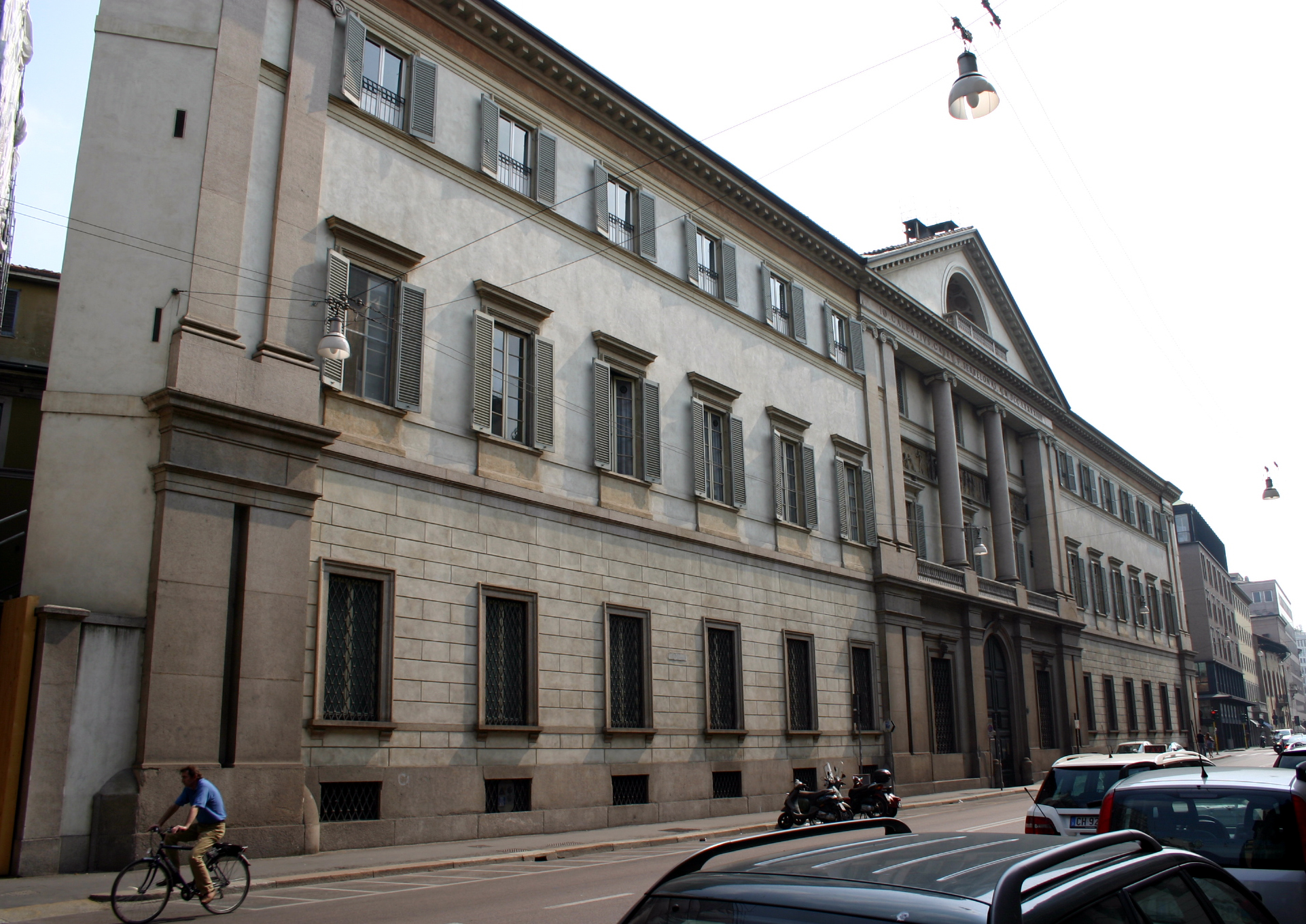
- Facade
- Interactive map of the Palazzo Serbelloni area

General information
- Architectural style: Neoclassic
- Location: 16 Corso Venezia, Milan, Italy
- Construction started: 1770

Design and construction
- Architect: Simone Cantoni

The Palazzo Serbelloni is a Neoclassical palace in Milan. The palace at the site was constructed for the aristocrat Gabrio Serbelloni. In the late 18th century, the palace was extensively reconstructed including the façade by Simone Cantoni. The palace was used in 1796 for three months by Napoleon and Josephine. The interiors retain some of the prior splendor, some reconstructed. The first floor has a Neoclassical hall, originally decorated by Giuliano Trabellesi. In 1943, air-raids destroyed extensive sections, including the famous library with its 75,000 books, and the frescoes by Traballesi.
