= Palazzo Mellerio, Milan =

Palazzo Mellerio
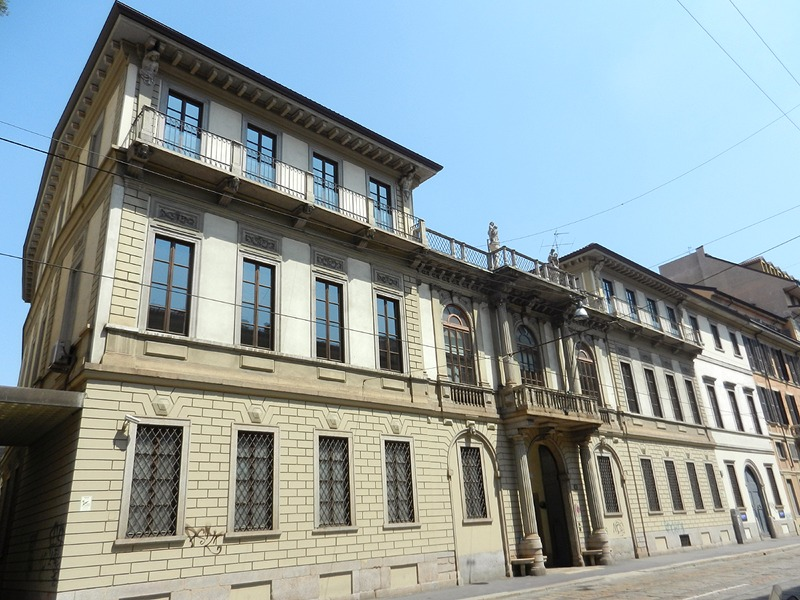
- Palazzo Mellerio in Milan
- Click on the map for a fullscreen view

General information
- Architectural style: Neoclassical
- Location: Milan, Italy
- Coordinates: 45°27′33.81″N 9°11′26.84″E

Design and construction
- Architect(s): Simone Cantoni

The Palazzo Mellerio is a neoclassical palace located on Corso di Porta Romana 13 in Milan, Italy.

== History ==
Refurbishment of the buildings at the site into a single palace was commissioned in 1750 by Giovanni Battista Mellori, with designs by Simone Cantoni. A distinct Palazzo Mellerio in the town of Domodossola was commissioned in 1816 by Count Giacomo Mellerio from Giovanni Luca Cavazzo for use as a school.

== Description ==
The elevated lateral wings with some atlantes at the corner cornices of the wings add some dynamism to the facade. The interior of the piano nobile was decorated with stucco and chiaroscuro frescoes. The central entrance portico has a balcony that rests on doric columns; the balcony has a protruding canopy with corinthian columns. The inner courtyard has paired columns.
