= Loÿs Delteil =

French artist (1869–1927)

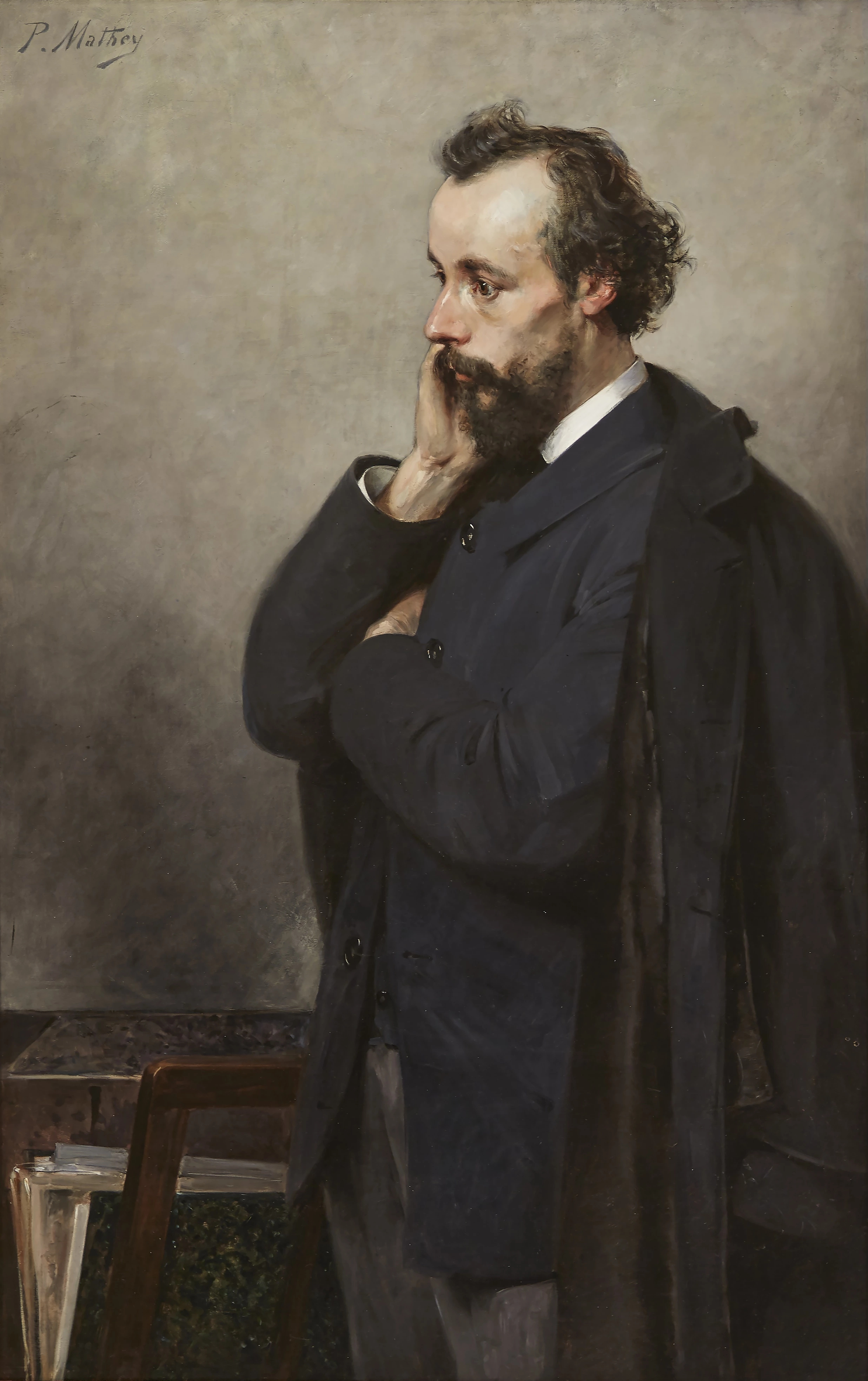
- Loÿs Delteil; portrait by Paul Mathey
- Born: Henri Loÿs Delteil; 7 May 1869; Paris, France
- Died: 11 November 1927 (aged 58); Paris, France
- Occupations: Engraver; lithographer; illustrator; art historian
- Style: Engraving, lithography

Henri Loÿs Delteil, also known as Léo Delteil (7 May 1869, Paris – 11 November 1927, Paris) was a French engraver, lithographer, illustrator, and art historian.

== Biography ==
Delteil's father was a librarian.

Delteil began as a student of the sculptor and engraver François Théodore Devaulx. At the age of thirteen, he started collecting prints, with advice from the print merchant Victor Prouté (1854–1918). At sixteen, he became an apprentice to the lithographer Charles Pipard (1832–1916), as well as learning engraving techniques from, among others, Henri Boutet. In 1889, Delteil held his first exhibition of etchings at the Salon in Paris, and would continue to have regular showings there until 1913.

During his military service, from 1889 to 1892, Delteil wrote some occasional articles about engravers; mostly in defense of his contemporaries, and critical of the government, which appeared to have little interest in acquiring prints. To ensure his future livelihood, he consulted with the relevant merchants and wrote their catalogues.

In 1895, Delteil founded a magazine, L'Estampe Moderne, featuring prints from amateurs as well as professionals, but it folded after only five issues. This was during a time when photographic means of reproduction were replacing traditional engraving.

In 1897, he founded a society for artists, "La Liane", which focused on prints created with manual processes, and organized exhibitions. He also joined the editorial staff at L'Estampe et l'affiche, a neo-traditionalist magazine, founded by André Mellerio and Noël Clément-Janin. Later, during the 1920s, he collaborated with Byblis, a similar magazine edited by the engraver Pierre Gusman.

Delteil was awarded a bronze medal at the Exposition Universelle of 1900.

In 1906, the income he had earned as a professional consultant enabled him to publish an historiographic inventory series, Le Peintre-graveur illustré, which he produced until his death.

== See also ==
- List of French artists
- List of French writers
- List of historians
- List of illustrators
- List of printmakers
