= Le Barc de Boutteville =

The art gallery of Le Barc de Boutteville, at 47 Rue Le Peletier, 9th arrondissement, was one of the few places in Paris in the 1890s where young artists were welcome to present their work to the public, in the years after the death of Theo van Gogh and before Ambroise Vollard opened his gallery.

The proprietor, Louis Le Barc, died prematurely, in 1897.

== Exhibitions ==
=== 1892 ===
- Peintres Impressionnistes et Symbolistes, Première exposition - December 1891/January 1892; Artists included Paul Vogler, Denis, Bernard, Augustin, Bonnard, Dulac, Léon Giran-Max, Lepère, Paillard, Ranson, Roy, Toulouse-Lautrec, Signac, Willette and Manet.
- Exposition de 16 toiles peintes par Van Gogh - catalogue woodcut by Émile Bernard; c. April
- Peintres Impressionnistes et Symbolistes, Deuxième exposition - Introduction by G.-Albert Aurier; c. Summer (no precise dates)
- Peintres Impressionnistes et Symbolistes, Troisième exposition - Introduction by Gaston Lesaulx; opening 15 November 1892.

=== 1893 ===
- Peintres Impressionnistes et Symbolistes, Quatrième exposition - Introduction by Camille Mauclair; spring; opening 10 March.
- Les Portraits du prochain siècle - autumn (no precise dates)
- Peintres Impressionnistes et Symbolistes, Cinquième exposition - Introduction by Camille Mauclair; winter (no precise dates)

=== 1894 ===
- Maufra: Œuvres récentes - Introduction by Frantz Jourdain; 18 January - 18 February
- Peintres Impressionnistes et Symbolistes, Sixième exposition - Introduction by Camille Mauclair; running from 2 March. Included pastels by Jeanne Jacquemin, landscapes by Firmin Maglin, Osbert and Guilloux and studies by Maufra, Dethomas, Gauguin, Cattet, etc.
- Peintres Impressionnistes et Symbolistes, Septième exposition - Introduction by René Barjean; running from 10 July. Included works by Osbert, Guiguet, Louis Collin, De Groux, Henry Bouvet, Garnot, Ibels, Toulouse-Lautrec, Maufra, Fernand Piet, etc. Review makes particular mention of "a delightful pastel, Etude de femme, by M. Dethomas, the "poetic" pieces by Mme Blanche Jacquemin, especially Dove of fidelity (pastel), Marjolaine of purity (lithography) and the charming profile of a knight of legend, who stands out harmoniously on a background that looks like it was painted by Gustave Moreau." A further review make favourables mentions of the studies of Toulouse-Lautrec, Louis Roy, the Judith of Henry de Groux, the Woman with the Cup (Femme à la Tasse) and Sleep (Sommeil) by Dethomas, Fantasies of Jules Chéret, and the flowers of Eva Lowstadt.
- Peintres Impressionnistes et Symbolistes, Huitième exposition; running from 8 November. Review states: "It looks pretty much like the previous seven. There are almost all the same names, and the same artists offering us only what they were accustomed to offer us. Some, however, whose "violence" astonished us formerly, settle among others, M. d'Espagnat; others, on the contrary, by applying themselves to synthesis, want us to admire compositions of disconcerting "simplicity". Lovers of "fantastic" painting will find something to admire; for instance, Mr. Roy's canvases will undoubtedly satisfy them. Among all, we are happy to meet Mr. Cottet. He exhibits four canvases of real value; they are Breton studies: At the Cabaret of Concarneau, At the edge of the sea, Bretonnes at the church, quite characteristic and vigorously painted. Notable mentions of MM. Maufra, Anquetin, Angrand, Dethomas, Toutouse-Lautrec, Moret, Mailland, Guilloux. A young sculptor; Mr. Durrio, exhibits a very skillful model of Sancho Panza." A further review notes that among almost 200 works on display, "we notice especially some works of C. Cottet, the painter of Bretonnes, and four or five paintings by Dethomas, of which the Woman with the plate (Femme au plateau) and the Couture attract the attention sharply. Among the landscape painters, M. Deconchy reveals to us by a pretty clear and fine picture, Côtes de Provence. To mention again the Marines de Guilloux and Peske, a sunset by H. de Groux, landscapes signed Butler, Durenne, Roussel, Collin, Maglin; the panels of Serusier, etc. Excessively mystical sculptures and ultra-symbolist canvases serve as a setting for this exhibition, where amateurs have become accustomed to watching new talents."

=== 1895 ===
- Armand Séguin: Œuvres nouvelles - Introduction by Paul Gauguin; February - March
- Peintres Impressionnistes et Symbolistes, Neuvième exposition - Introduction by Maurice Denis; running from 27 April. In addition to works displayed by Denis, a review makes particular mention of "Mr. Henry Moret who offers us beautiful and vigorous interpretations of Breton landscapes, Mr. Gustave Loiseau who delicately impresses us with his Night Effect, and his Weir at Mortain, and also MM. Dethomas, Fernand Piet, Manuel Robbe, Georges d'Espagnat, Leon Fauché, Guilloux, Launay, Leheutre and Guiguet."
- Peintres Impressionnistes et Symbolistes, Dixième exposition; running September. Exhibit brought together "a hundred or so" works, with a review making particular mention of those by Leheutre, Maxime Dethomas, Georges d'Espagnat, Loiseau, Maillol, Peske, Bourdin, Angrand and Ànquetin.

=== 1896 ===
- Peintres Impressionnistes et Symbolistes, Onzième exposition - Introduction by René Barjean; running from 20 January. Review makes particular mention of "flowers, by M. Dethomas; the markets, of Mr. Piet; the landscapes of M. Roussel, of M. Giran-Max; a drawing of Skaters, of M. d'Espagnat; a boat by M. Chaudet; streets, of Mr. Hayet; a procession of Bretonnes by a forest path, of M. Sérusier, and two statuettes of women and children, of a very thoughtful, very sure feeling of art, of M. Voullot."
- Dulac - Introduction by Henry Cochin; 11 May - 4 June 1896
- Peintres Impressionnistes et Symbolistes, Douzième exposition - Introduction by Armand Séguin; running from 21 July
- Peintres Impressionnistes et Symbolistes, Treizième exposition - Introduction by Louis Roy; running from 26 December. Exhibition poster by Maxime Dethomas.

=== 1897 ===
- Peintres Impressionnistes et Symbolistes, Quatorzième exposition - Introduction by Louis Roy; running from 25 June
- Peintres Impressionnistes et Symbolistes, Quinzième exposition, chez Ch. Dosbourg, Galerie Le Barc de Boutteville - Introduction by Frédéric Cordey; running from 1 December

=== 1898 ===
- Tableaux de Miss Marie J. Naylor ; May to June 1898

== Resources ==
Most of the catalogues are reprinted in Modern Art in Paris, ed. Theodore Reff, vol.

=== Literature ===
- Guy, Cecile: Le Barc de Boutteville, L'Œil, April 1965, pp. 31–36; 58-59
- Monneret, Sophie: L'impressionnisme et son époque, dictionnaire international, Denoël, Paris 1979 ISBN 2-221-05222-6
