= Mellerio dits Meller =

French jewellery company

Mellerio International S.A.
- Trade name: Mellerio dits Meller
- Type: Private (Société Anonyme)
- Industry: Jewellery
- Founded: 1613; 413 years ago
- Founder: Mellerio family
- Headquarters: 9 Rue de la Paix; Paris, France
- Key people: Laure-Isabelle Mellerio (President and artistic director)
- Products: Rings, earrings, bracelets, necklaces, pendants
- Owner: Mellerio family
- Website: mellerio.fr

Mellerio dits Meller is a French jewellery house, which was founded in 1613 and is still active today. It is the oldest family-owned jewellery company in Europe. It gives its name to the Mellerio cut, a 57-facet jewel cut, shaped as an oval within an ellipse. Since 1815, Mellerio has been based on Rue de la Paix in Paris. It is a member of the Comité Colbert and also of the Henokiens, an international association of family companies over 200 years old. Directors François and Olivier Mellerio are the fourteenth generation to run the family business.

== History ==
The firm traces its history to 1613, when it was established in Paris by the Mellerio family (originally from Valle Vigezzo) under the patronage of Queen Marie de Médicis.

Jean-Baptiste Mellerio (1765–1850) started trading in Versailles in 1777, and he attracted the patronage of Queen Marie Antoinette. According to Côme Mellerio, referring to his company's archives, on the day of the French Revolution (14 July 1789), the sales at Mellerio's shop in Paris were excellent. In 1796, Mellerio set up shop on rue Vivienne in Versailles, retaining the patronage of the Empress Joséphine.

François Mellerio (1772–1843) moved the firm to Paris, initially at 4, rue du Coq Saint-Honoré. In 1815, he moved the workshop to 9, rue de la Paix in Paris, where it remains today. After the restoration of the French monarchy in 1830, Mellerio became suppliers to Queen Marie-Amélie and King Louis-Philippe.

Jean-François Mellerio (1815–1896) opened a branch in Madrid in 1850, from which he supplied customers including Queen Isabella II and the future Empress Eugénie. François Mellerio further expanded the company's influence during the 19th century, serving prominent European monarchies including the French, Spanish, and Italian royal families.

The company's estimated sales (in 2010/2011) were €8 million.

== Notable works ==
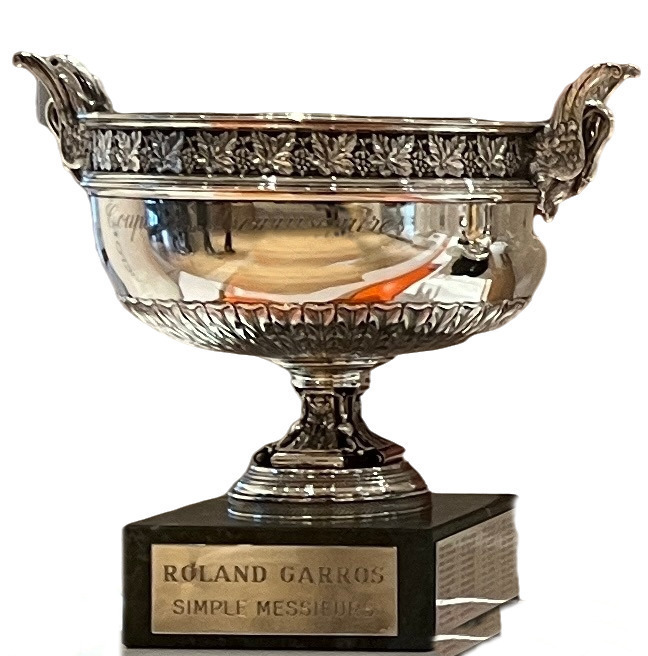
Coupe des Mousquetaires trophy

Mellerio has an archive of about 100,000 items.

=== Trophies ===
Mellerio made the Coupe des Mousquetaires trophy, which has been awarded to the winner of the Men's Singles competition at the French Open since 1981. It is in the form of a large silver bowl, with a vine leaf trim. Winners receive a pure silver replica of the trophy, specially made and engraved for each winner by Mellerio.

Mellerio has made ceremonial swords for members of the Académie Française, including François Cheng. Each sword is unique, with the hilt decorated with symbols of its owner's achievements.

=== Tiaras and royal jewels ===
The Mellerio Shell tiara was given to Infanta Isabella of Spain as a wedding present from her mother Queen Isabella II in 1868. The tiara had been made by Mellerio for the 1867 Paris Exhibition. It is made of diamonds in the shape of shells decorated with pearls. It remains part of the Spanish royal family jewels, worn today by Queen Sofía of Spain.

Mellerio is also attributed with the creation of the Spanish Floral Tiara, made of diamonds in a pattern of flowers, which was a wedding gift to the future Queen Sofia from General Franco on her marriage to Juan Carlos of Spain in 1962.

The jewel collection of the Dutch royal family includes a tiara made by Mellerio for Queen Emma. The ruby tiara is part of a set made in 1889. The parure was designed by Oscar Massin and made by Mellerio. Commissioned by King Willem III as a 30th birthday gift for Queen Emma, this tiara is part of a larger ruby parure which included a tiara, necklace, bracelet, brooch, stomacher, earrings, and a fan. The cost of the parure was significant, around 160,000 guilders at the time. This parure remains an important part of the Dutch royal jewelry collection and has been worn by several generations of Dutch queens and princesses.

Mellerio also made the rose-pattern diamond tiara bought by Victor Emmanuel II of Italy for the 1868 wedding of his son, Prince Umberto, to Margherita of Savoy.

A 1742 peacock brooch by Mellerio was worn by Anita Delgado as princess of Kapurthala.

== Mellerio family ==
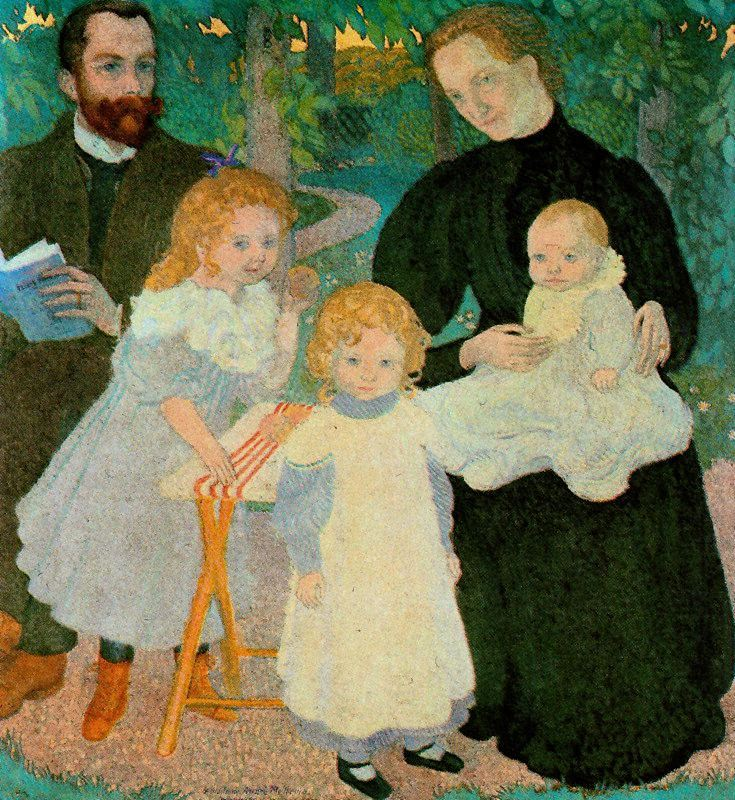
André Mellerio in The Mellerio Family by Maurice Denis, 1897.

At one time, the family owned the Pavilon de Musique in Versailles, which was originally built for Princess Marie Joséphine of Savoy.

The events surrounding the death of Antoine Mellerio in 1870 inspired Robert Browning's 1873 poem "Red Cotton Night-Cap Country".

André Mellerio (1862–1943) was an art critic and publisher, and the author of Mouvement idéaliste en peinture (1896). He popularised the work of the artists Odilon Redon and Charles Guilloux.

Charles Mellerio (1879–1978) was an artist whose watercolours were exhibited many times at the Salon des Artistes Français at the Grand Palais. He received the Prix de Rome award for drawing at the age of 20.
