= Guilloux =

Guilloux is a French surname. Notable people with the surname include:

- Charles Guilloux (1866–1946), French artist
- Louis Guilloux (1899–1980), French writer
- Pierre Guilloux (1901–1937), French high jumper and basketball player

== See also ==
- Guillou
