= Jacquemin =

Jacquemin is a French surname. Notable people with the surname include:

- Alexis Jacquemin (1938–2004), Belgian economist
- Jeanne Jacquemin, French artist
- Michel Jacquemin (born 1942), Belgian racing cyclist
- Victor Jacquemin (1892–?), Belgian sprinter
