= Coupe des Mousquetaires =

Trophy awarded to the winner of the Men's Singles competition at the French Open

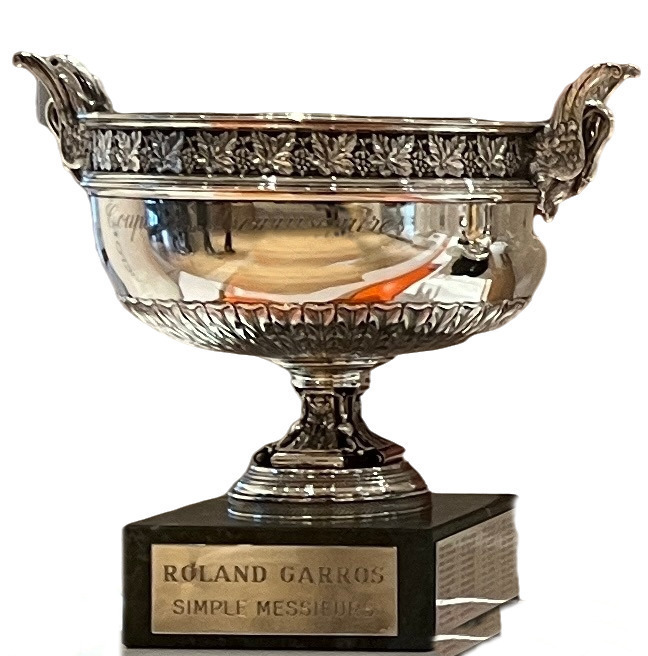
Coupe des Mousquetaires

The Coupe des Mousquetaires (lit. 'the Musketeers' Trophy') is the trophy awarded to the winner of the men's singles competition at the French Open.

The trophy was created in its current form in 1981, after Philippe Chatrier, then president of the Fédération Française de Tennis (FFT), offered jewellers in Paris the opportunity to redesign it. It is supposed to symbolise the victories of four famous French tennis players, who together make up the "Four Musketeers": Jacques Brugnon, Jean Borotra, Henri Cochet and René Lacoste.

The design eventually chosen was that of the family jeweller Mellerio. The trophy has a wide aperture, bordered with vine leaves and decorated with two swan-shaped handles. The trophy has an engraving on the front reading Internationaux de France (lit. 'French International' [of Tennis]), the official name of the French Open in French.

The trophy is housed in the office of the president of the FFT, and is only removed once every year when the men's singles winner at the French Open is announced. The only exception was in 2009, when the FFT allowed Roger Federer to keep the Coupe des Mousquetaires for just a few hours because he wanted to show the trophy to his father who was unable to attend the final. However, Federer was accompanied by four bodyguards, including two who spent the night in front of his room and the trophy was finally returned the next day. The winner does not get to keep the actual trophy; a new replica is produced every year that the player gets to keep. The replica, which is always smaller than the original that is displayed during the trophy ceremony, is made from a sheet of solid silver, and takes over one hundred hours to complete. Rafael Nadal won the 50th year Open era anniversary French Open title. He received a slightly larger replica for 2018 compared to his other French Open replica trophies.

The original trophy weighs 14 kg, is 40 cm high and 19 cm wide.

A one time full-size replica of the Coupe des Mousquetaires was awarded to Rafael Nadal for his 10th win of the French Open in June 2017. It has the same measurements as the original trophy, with the only difference being the original trophy's marble base substituted for a simple black coloured base with a different inscription: on the base of Nadal's trophy is the title 'Decima' meaning 'Tenth' in Spanish and below it listing of all of Nadal's French Open titles up to that date (2005–08, 2010–14, 2017).

Nadal went on to win an eleventh title in 2018, this marked the 50th year of the Open era in professional tennis, which started at the 1968 French Open.

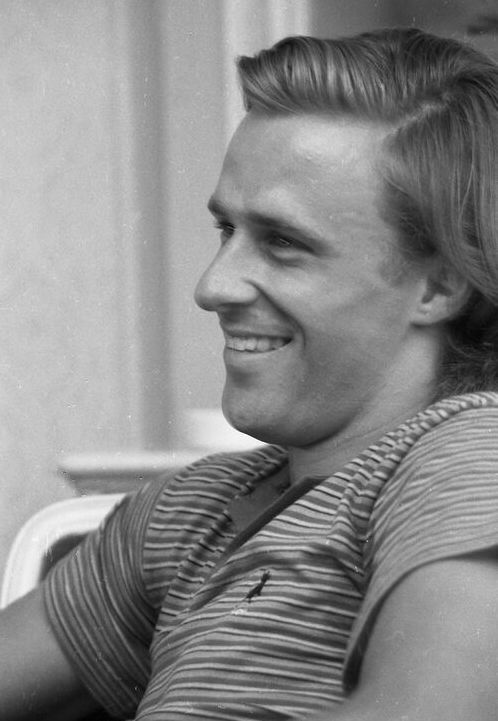
Björn Borg, first recipient of the Coupe des Mousquetaires

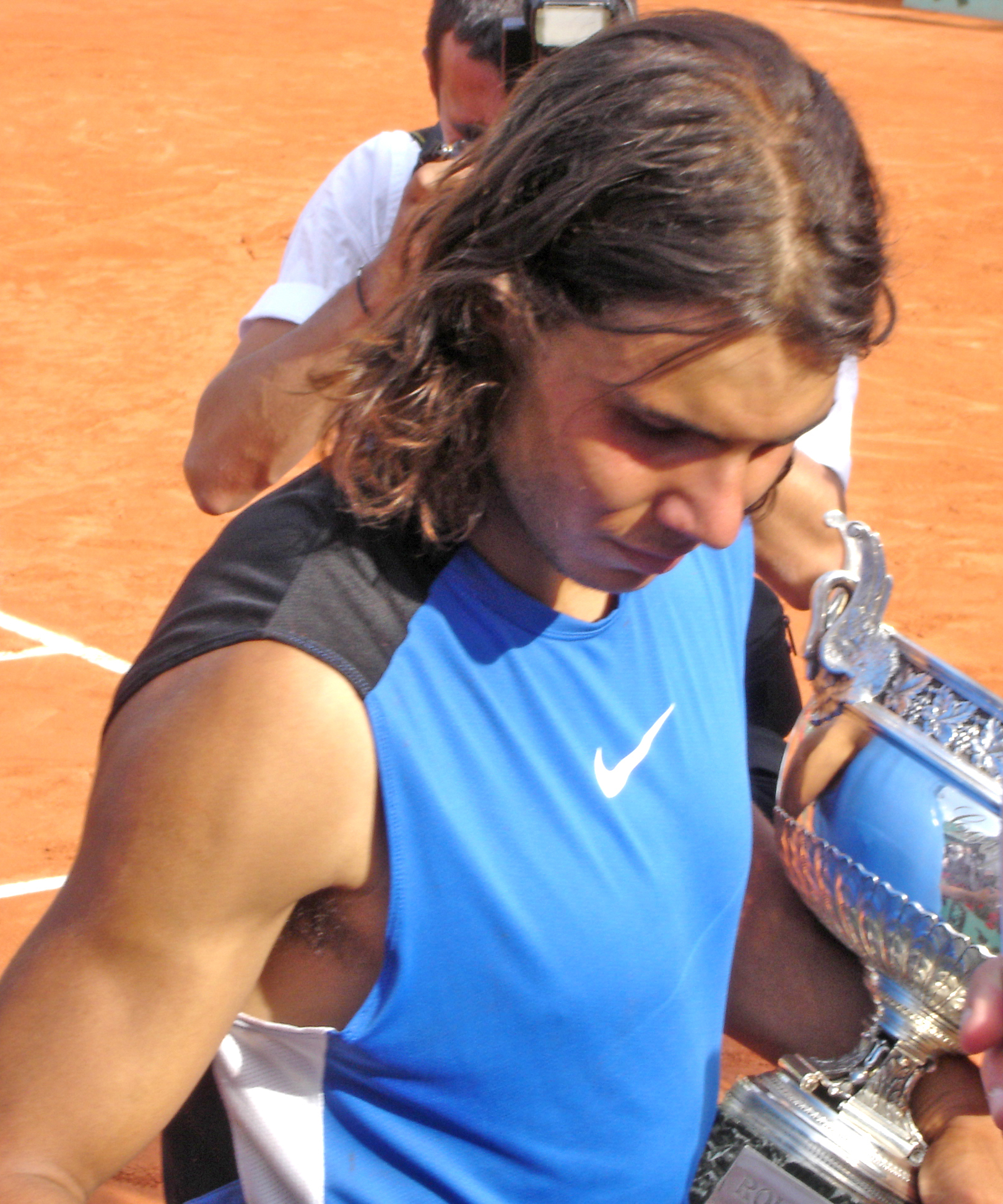
Rafael Nadal, most times winner of the Coupe des Mousquetaires with 14 titles

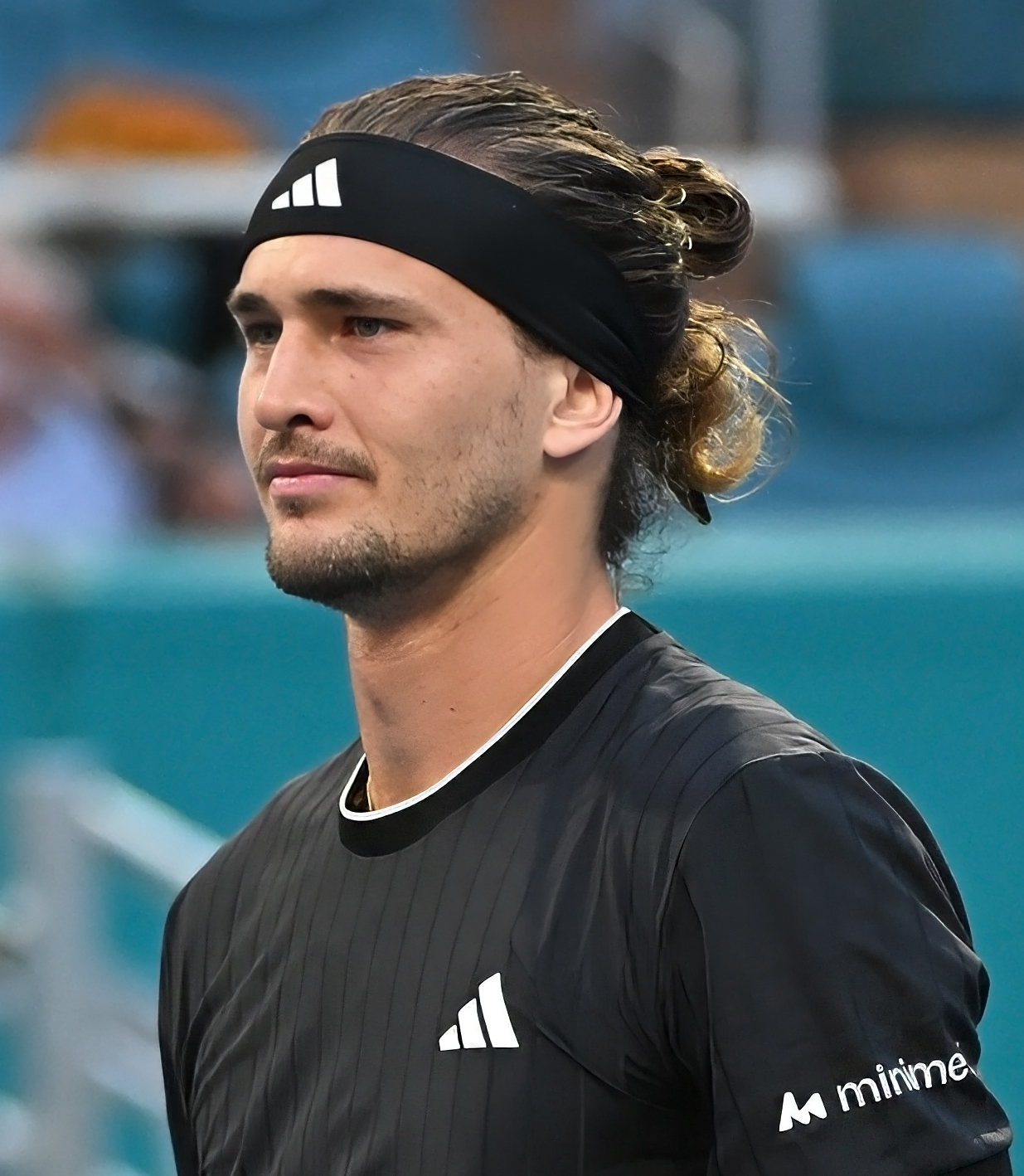
Alexander Zverev, current holder of the Coupe des Mousquetaires

== See also ==
- Coupe Suzanne Lenglen – trophy awarded to the winner of the women's singles competition
