= Oscar Massin =

Belgian jewellery designer

UpdateOscar Massin (1829–1913) was a Belgian-born French jeweler known as “The Diamond Reformer," who created some of the 19th century's most influential and innovative fine jewelry that radically redefined a new era for the industry at large. While Massin remains one of the least-known Parisian jewelers, he produced some of the most significant works of his time, many for European royalty. Massin is celebrated for his patented diamond lacework technique, which uses filigree to create the illusion of woven metal. Massin is also credited with creating the first “illusory” setting, designed to emphasize the size of the diamond by minimizing the metal around it.

== Early life ==
Born in Liège, Belgium in 1829, Oscar Massin was trained as a jeweler from the age of 11 and educated at the Academy of Fine Arts. In 1851, he moved to Paris, then in a golden age of haute joaillerie, where Théodore Fester took him on as a bench jeweler for the next three years. To supplement his income, Massin also sketched his own jewelry designs, which caught the attention of goldsmith Léon Rouvenat, who hired Massin as his Chef d’Atelier. Massin went on to work for Théodore Viette—a renowned workshop of manufacturing jewelers—who had been commissioned by Napoleon III to design a tiara for Empress Eugènie of France. Viette delegaed the design to Adolphe Devin and the manufacturing to Massin. He continued to create bespoke pieces for royalty around the world.

Massin was a teacher and an artist. Massin exhibited unfinished or deconstructed jewels for teaching purposes.

== Career ==
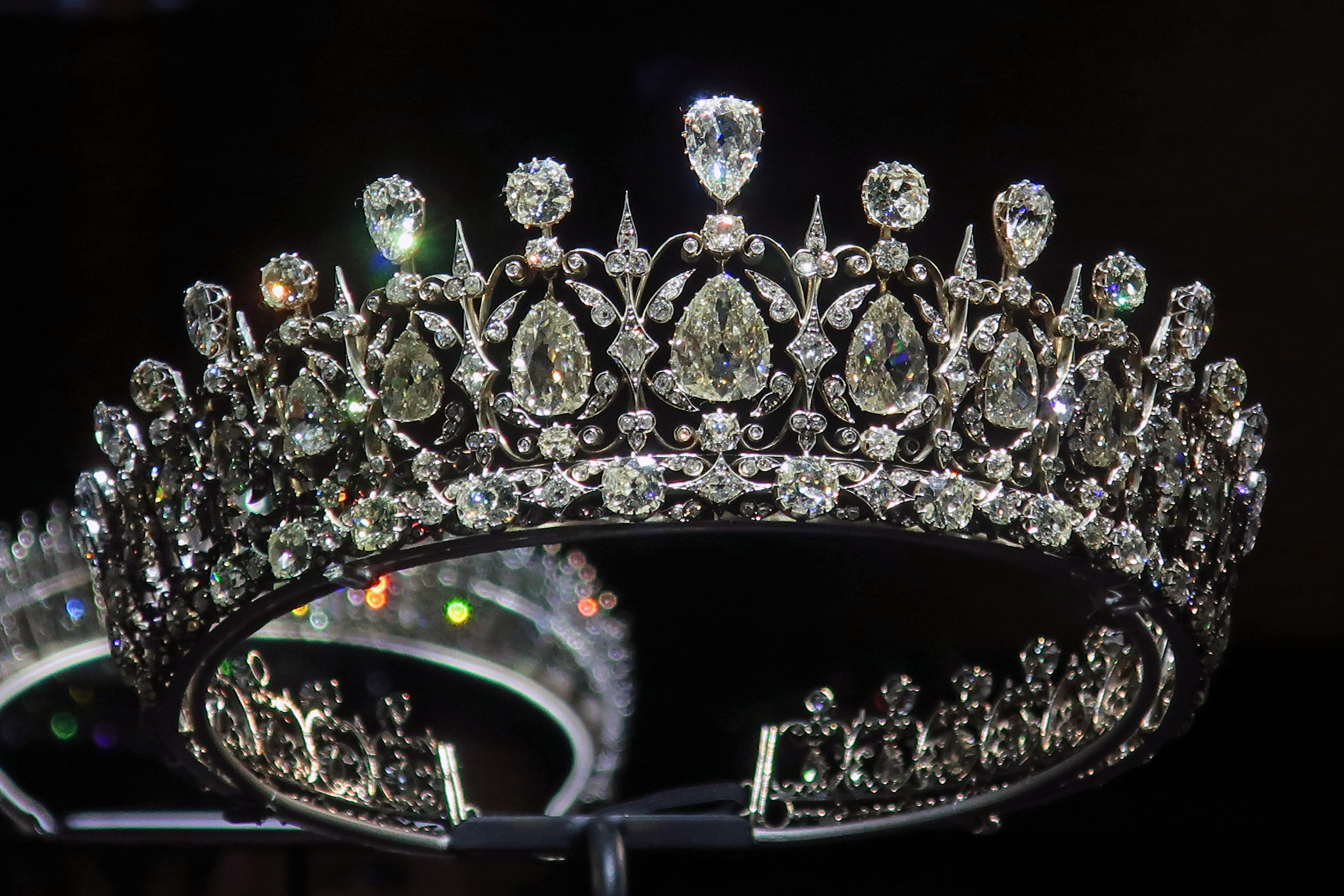
The Fife Tiara, a wedding present to Louise, Princess Royal from her groom the 1st Duke of Fife in 1887 is attributed to Oscar Massin.

Oscar Massin was a renowned craftsman and designer. He studied the structure and engineering of diamond settings in the service of naturalism, making distinguished pieces.

In the early-to-mid 1860s, Massin began to explore new, naturalistic models featuring floral and foliate motifs with delicate, nearly invisible mounting; Massin dedicated significant time to the study of flowers, botanicals and even insects within their natural worlds in order to fully understand the intricacies of their composition, resulting in original, imaginative design. Before opening up his own jewelry studio in 1863, Massin worked as a designer and goldsmith for many well-known jewelers in Paris, including the famous Lemonnier. In 1867, Massin exhibited at the International Exposition of 1867 (French: Exposition universelle [d'art et d'industrie] de 1867) for the first time under his own name. His centerpiece: a tiara designed with a diamond, ruby and emerald bandeau finished with a diamond-set feather and gem-set chains. He continued to exhibit, and at the Exposition Universelle (1878), was awarded both a Grand Prix and the Legion of Honour. Among his exquisite creations: a three-dimensional rose pavé-set with diamonds, as well as a diamond-set belt and a tiara paired with diamond briolettes.

For more than two decades Massin continued to design and create for prominent jewelers, including Baugrand, Fontana, Sandoz and Rouvenat, Boucheron, Mellerio, Chaumet, and Tiffany. Massin retired in 1891, leaving behind a legacy of innovation and carving a path forward for those who followed.

Massin died in his Parisian apartment on 13 February 1913.

== Works and commissions ==
1860:

- Tiara with brooch—wild roses, wheat and oats, sold to Georgian Princess Catherina Dadiani; beginning of Massin’s exploration of naturalism.

1863:

- Eglantine branch, one of Massin’s most influential and replicated designs.

1867:

- The first time Massin exhibited under his own name at the Exposition Universelle with his Grand parure de tête and Diadème arceaux.

1878:

- Diamond tea rose brooch
- Diamond necklace, designed as a series of clusters, each set with a cushion-shaped diamond within a double border of rose diamonds, spaced by claw-set cushion-shaped diamonds and suspending a similar drop-shaped pendant.
- Patented diamond lace, offered by the meter.

1879:

- Medallion for King William III of the Netherlands, set with a rare portrait diamond engraved with a profile of the King’s head. The King presented the piece to his bride, Princess Emma.
- Diamond belt for Nizam family

1889:

- Diamond and silver tiara for Princess Louise of Wales
