= Guillou =

- Pronunciation: pronounced [ɡwiʎu], pronounced [ɡɥiʎu], pronounced [ɡɥiʎɔʊ] and French pronunciation: [ɡi.ju]

Origin
- Origin: Breton
- Region of origin: Brittany

Other names
- Variant forms: Le Guillou, Guilloux, Guillo

Guillou is a surname of Breton origin. It may refer to any the following people:

Guillou derives from the Breton name Gwilhoù which is a hypocorism of the name Gwilherm which is known as William in English.

- Charles Guillou (1813–1899), American naval surgeon
- Fernand Guillou (1926–2009), French basketball player
- Jan Guillou (born 1944), Swedish writer and journalist
- Jean Guillou (1930–2019), French composer, organist, pianist, and pedagogue
- Jean Guillou (1931–2019), French gymnast
- Jean-Marc Guillou (born 1945), French footballer and football manager
- Patrick Guillou (born 1970), French football defender

== See also ==
- Guilloux
