= Red Cotton Night-Cap Country =

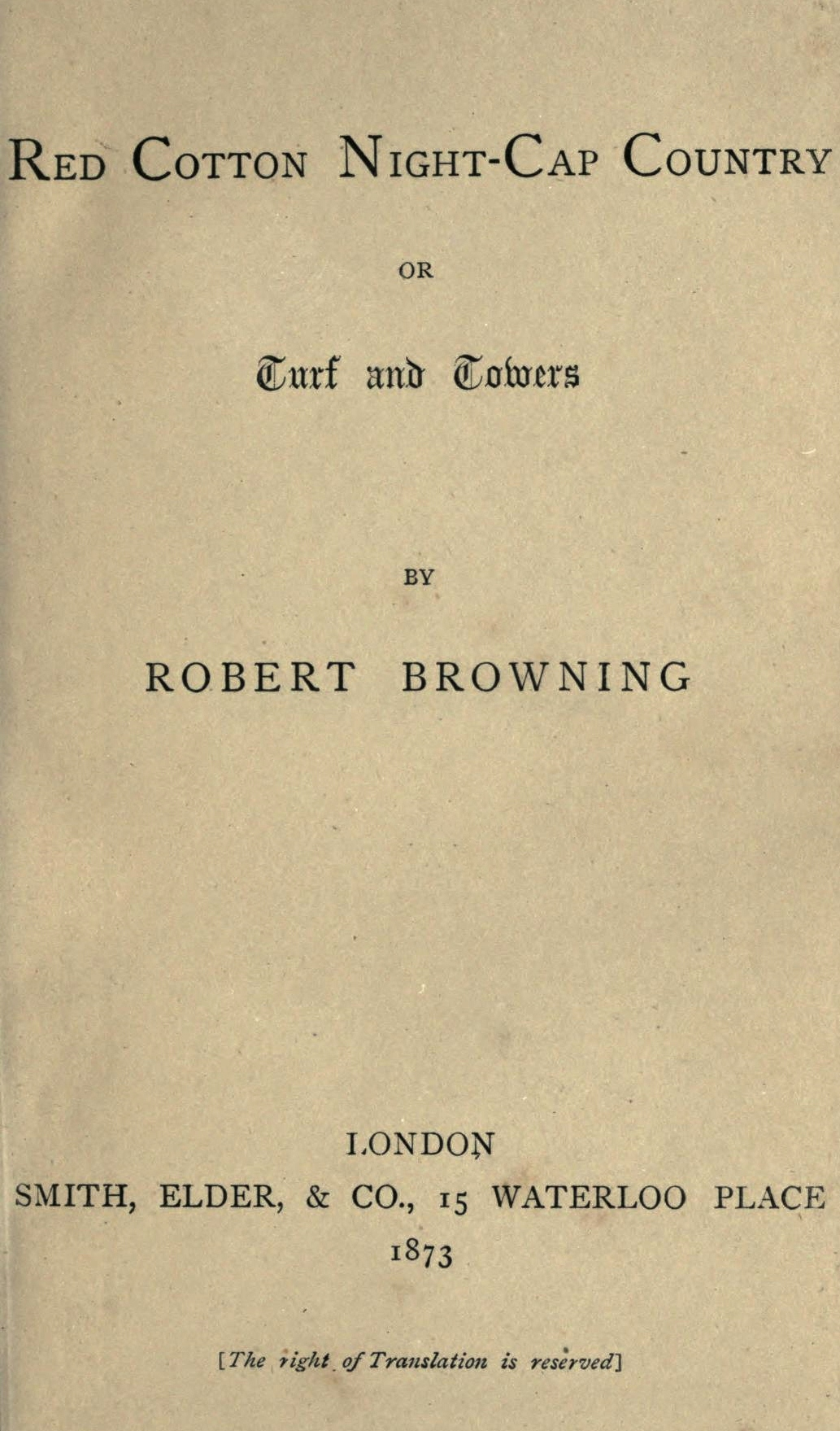
- First edition title page
- Author: Robert Browning
- Language: English
- Genre: Blank verse poem
- Publisher: Smith, Elder & Co.
- Publication date: 1873
- Publication place: United Kingdom
- Media type: Print (hardback)
- Pages: 282 pp

Red Cotton Night-Cap Country, or Turf and Towers (1873) is a poem in blank verse by Robert Browning. It tells a story of sexual intrigue, religious obsession and violent death in contemporary Paris and Normandy, closely based on the true story of the death, supposedly by suicide, of the jewellery heir Antoine Mellerio. Red Cotton Night-Cap Country has never been one of Browning's more popular poems, originally because of the perceived sordidness of the story, and later on grounds thus summarised by the critic C. H. Herford:

The poet followed on the heels of the journalist, and borrowed, it must be owned, not a little of his methods. If any poem of Browning's may be compared to versified special correspondence, it is this. He tells the story, in his own person, in blank verse of admirable ease and fluency, from which every pretence of poetry is usually remote.

== Synopsis ==
It opens by setting the scene in the Norman village of Saint-Rambert amid countryside which the poet discusses with his friend Anne Thackeray, the dedicatee of the poem. Since she has jokingly named the locale "White Cotton Night-Cap Country", from the somnolence of the Calvados district and the white caps worn by the inhabitants, Browning changes the colour to red by way of pointing up the passion of the story he is about to tell, and alluding to the bonnet rouge worn by the revolutionaries of 1789 and again during the Paris Commune. The poem now turns to the story of Léonce Miranda, the heir to a jewellery business, who is raised on a luxurious estate in Saint-Rambert in the shadow of the church towers mentioned in the poem's subtitle, and who is torn between the opposing demands of religious devotion and the sensual, materialist side of his nature – "turf", as Browning calls it. Miranda takes a mistress called Clara de Millefleurs, and houses her in a luxuriously renovated priory. Miranda's scandalised mother exacerbates his sense of guilt over this affair to such good effect that he tries to commit suicide by drowning himself in the Seine. He fails in this attempt, but on the death of his mother Miranda is more riddled with guilt than ever, and so breaks off his relationship with Clara and, while trying to burn her letters, mutilates himself by burning off both his hands. However, he resumes the affair and tries to work off his guilt by making donations to the church of La Ravissante near his home. He dies by throwing himself from the belvedere of the priory as an act of faith, believing that he will be miraculously borne by the angels of the Virgin Mary to La Ravissante. His will, which divides his estate between the Church and Clara, is contested by his "cousinry", who believe Miranda to have been insane when he made it, but the courts uphold the will, declaring Miranda's death to have been an accident.

== Writing and publication ==
Having been originally told about the case of Antoine Mellerio in 1870 by his friend Joseph Milsand, Browning went on to research the facts with great thoroughness, reading newspaper reports and transcripts of the legal documents and interviewing residents of the district. Browning wrote Red Cotton Night-Cap Country during December 1872 and January 1873, while the lawsuit over Mellerio's will was still under appeal. He originally used the real names of the characters and places in the affaire Mellerio, but on submitting the manuscript to his friend Lord Coleridge, then Attorney-General, he was advised that he might be sued for libel. All the names were accordingly changed: Antoine Mellerio to Léonce Miranda, Anna de Beaupré to Clara de Millefleurs, Saint-Aubin to Saint-Rambert, and so on. The poem was published during the first week of May 1873 by Smith, Elder & Co., but they did not need to reprint it until, in 1889, along with The Inn Album, it formed volume 12 of his Poetical Works.

== Critical reception ==
Reviews were mixed. The Spectator spoke for many when it said that "Mr. Browning has not succeeded in giving any true poetic excuse for telling a story so full of disagreeable elements." The anonymous reviewer in Harper's Magazine was undeterred by the fact that he had not read the poem through:

It is not necessary to traverse every square mile of the Great Desert to know that its scenery is tame. We have read enough to know both the story and the manner in which it is told, and to enter our strong protest against the endeavour to glorify an illicit love with one who had been in succession a profligate woman and an unfaithful wife…It can only be characterized as harmless because the class of people who would be liable to be harmed by it will not understand nor even read it.

Thomas Carlyle remarked in conversation that there were "ingenious remarks here and there; but nobody out of bedlam ever before thought of choosing such a theme". On the other hand, The Examiner thanked Browning for "his brave and eloquent unfolding of some of the chief social abuses of the present day". A few years later the poet Arthur Symons praised it for virtues not normally associated with Browning: "No tale could be more straightforward, no language more lucid, no verse more free from harshness or irregularity", while G. K. Chesterton wrote that "Browning was one of those wise men who can perceive the terrible and impressive poetry of the police-news which is commonly treated as vulgarity".
