= Fernand Piet =

French painter (1869–1942)

Fernand Piet (August 26, 1869 – February 24, 1942) was a French painter. He was the firstborn son of Jules Piet and grandson of Charles Mozin.

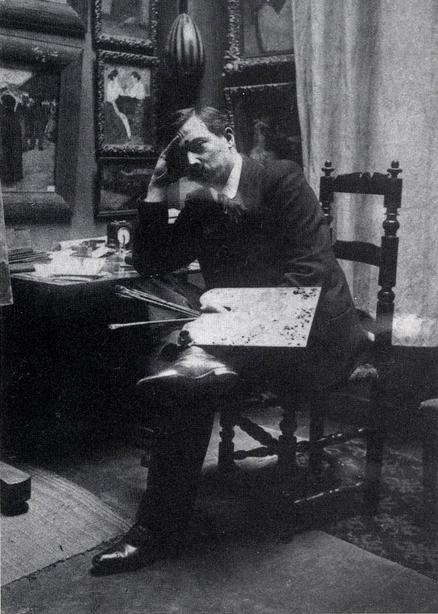
Portrait of Fernand Piet in his studio in rue Lamark

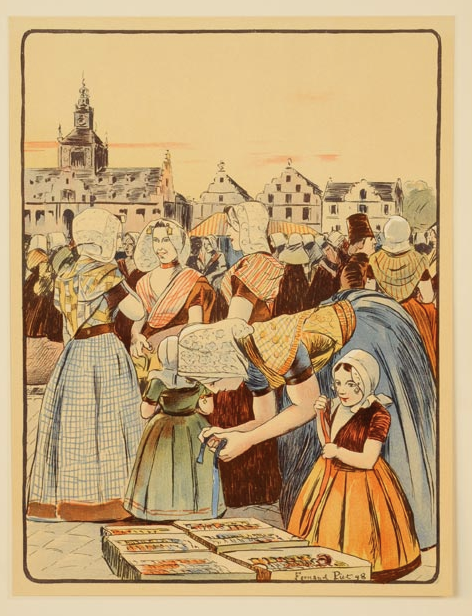
Fernand Piet Le Marché de Zealande, lithograph published by L'Estampe moderne

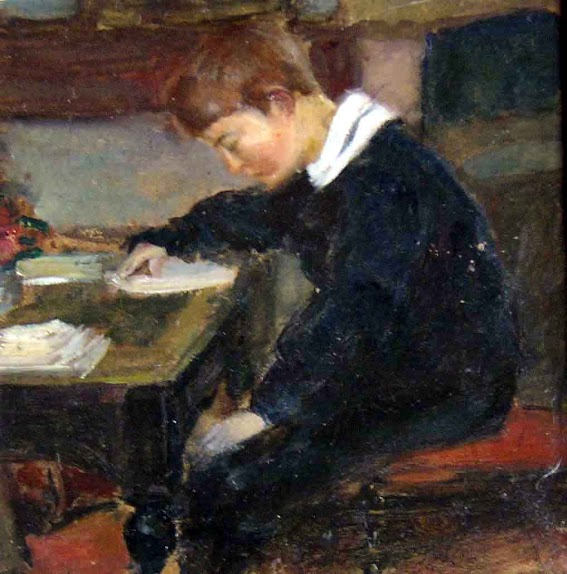
Michel Piet, brother of Fernand Piet

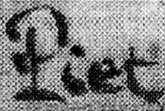
Signature on canvas by Fernand Piet

== Biography ==
Piet was born in Paris. He was a student of Eugène Carrière, Fernand Cormon and Alfred Roll.

At the Salon des Indépendants and the Salon des artistes français he exhibited his canvases and engravings of landscapes of Brittany. Holland and the South, and representations of common scenes: parks, children, markets. Piet is also the author of numerous female nudes and rare seascapes.

The economic wealth that his family provides him and the fortunate financial speculations on the Stock Exchange, allow him to lead a comfortable social life with his friends Lucien-Victor Guirand de Scevola, Edmond Lempereur and Jean-Louis Forain.

In 1905 he became with Paul Signac deputy director of the Salon des Indépendants.

In 1910 he received the honor of the Order of Academic Palms. He died in 1945 in Paris.

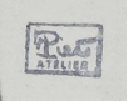
Between 1985 and 2003, 8 sales at the Hôtel Drouot dispersed Piet's atelier.

== Expositions ==
- Galerie du Théâtre d'Application (la Bodinière) 1893
- Esposizione internazionale d'arte di Venezia, Biennale de Venise 1899
- Exposition de la Sécession viennoise, Viennae (Austria) dicembre 1899
- Grosse gemälde Ausstellung des Kunstvereins in Bremen, Kunsthalle de Brême, Germania 1900
- Exposition universelle de 1900 Parigis, medaglia di bronzo
- Exposition universelle de Bruxelles 1910
- Exposition au profit des œuvres de guerre (maggio-giugno 1918) N°377 bis Marché à la poterie à Quimperlé
- Salon des indépendants di 1893 al 1925
- Salon des artistes français
- Galerie Interkunst München, Der maler Fernand Piet und die Belle Epoque dal 15/11/1968 al 15/01/1969 e dal 02/06/1969 al 30/06/1969
- Galerie Barthelmess & Wischnewski, Berlin dal 12 aprile al 7 giugno 2014 Die Entdeckung des Alltäglichen (Le Jardin du Luxembourg)

== Museums ==
- Musée de l'Ermitage (Saint-Pétersbourg), Marché a Brest(1899). antica collezione Sergueï Chtchoukine.
- Neue Pinakothek München. Le Square Montholon (1891)

== Bibliography ==
- L'Estampe Moderne (volume 2 nº 141) Marché en Zélande 1898
- Die kunst und das schöne heim (1968.Thiemig München) heft11. articolo di A.Sailer:Fernand Piet ein maler der belle époque
- Fernand Piet: Leben und werk, Erich Steingräfen (Bruckmann 1974)
- Catalogue de la 1ére vente d'atelier, Hôtel Drouot 1985: bibliothèque du Musée Rodin.
- French art treasures at the hermitage. Albert Grigorevitch Kostenevich (ed: Harry N.Abrams 1999)
- signaturen lexikon Pfisterer Paul (de Gruyter Berlin, New-York 1999)P439
- Catalogue de la 6éme vente d'atelier, Hôtel Drouot étude Chochon Barré et Allardi 29 octobre 2001: bibliothèque Kandinsky centre Pompidou

== Other projects ==
- Wikimedia Commons contiene immagini o altri file su Fernand Piet
