= François Théodore Devaulx =

French sculptor

- Born: September 15, 1808; Paris
- Died: January 21, 1871 (aged 62)
- Education: École nationale supérieure des beaux-arts of Paris
- Awards: Deuxième prix de Rome en sculpture de 1833

François Théodore Devaulx, or Théodore-François Devaulx, (September 15, 1808 – January 21, 1871) was a French sculptor.

== Biography ==
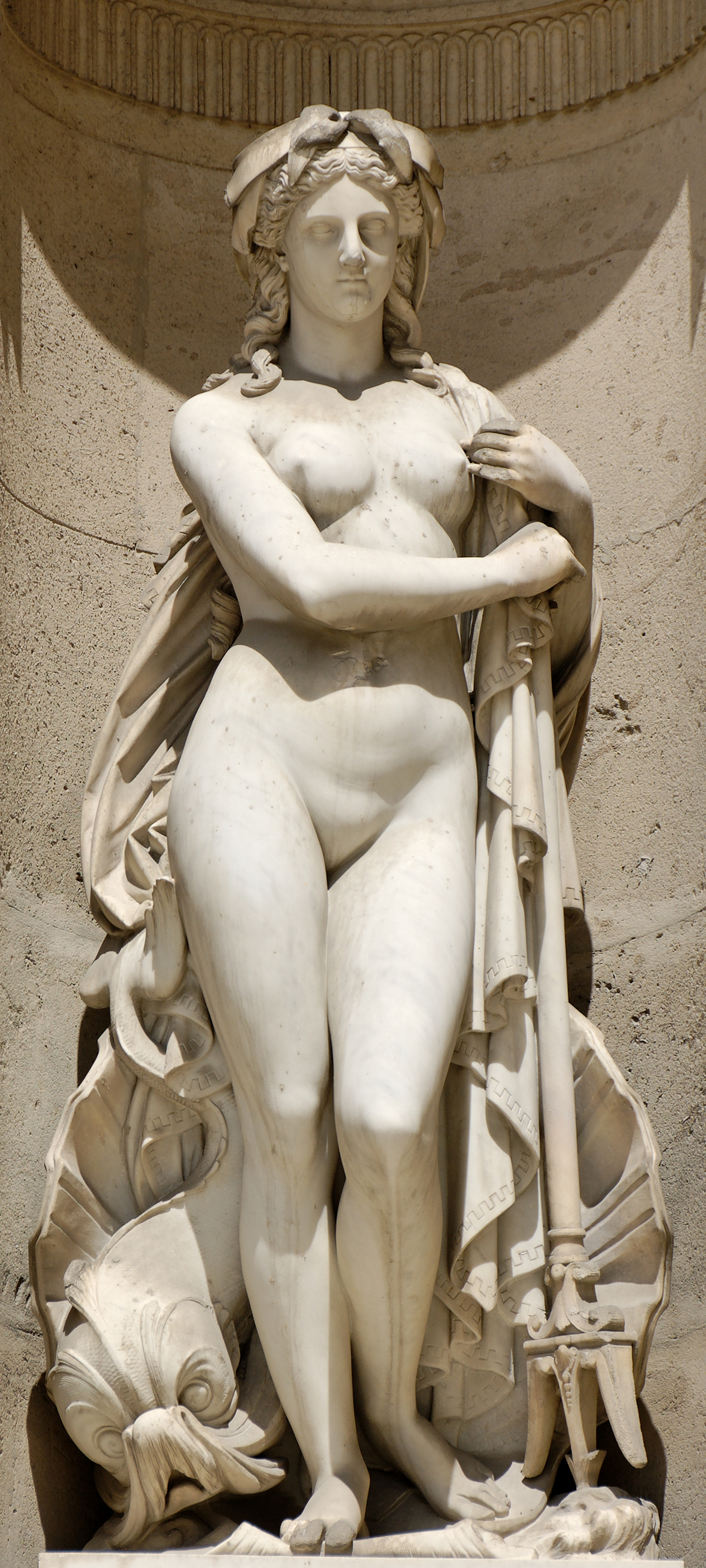
Amphitrite (1866), façade nord de la cour Carrée du palais du Louvre à Paris.

In 1823, Devaulx was a student of Jules Ramey (1796 - 1852) at the École des beaux-arts de Paris. He received the a second prize at the prix de Rome in 1833.

He participated in the Salon des artistes français, of which he was a member, from 1845 to 1870. He received a third class medal at the Salon of 1849.

He is buried in the Père Lachaise Cemetery 36th division.

== Works ==
=== Public collections ===
- Esquisse pour le concours de sculpture de la République (1848), Château de Nemours
- Amphitrite (1866), façade nord de la cour Carrée du palais du Louvre à Paris
- Général Bouscarin, musée du domaine national de Versailles
- Cavalier grec (1853) in stone, a statue installed on one of the pillars of the pont d'Iéna bridge in Paris.
- Mme Devaulx, sa femme, in the Petit Palais, fine arts museum of the city of Paris

== Bibliography ==
- Emmanuel Bénézit, Dictionnaire des peintres, sculpteurs, dessinateurs et graveurs, tome 3, Gründ, 1976. p. 546.
