= Jeanne Jacquemin =

French painter

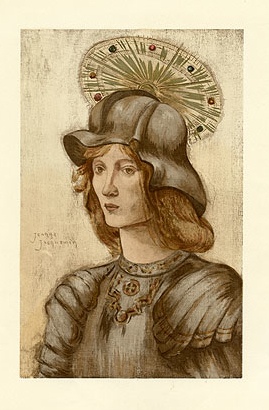
- Saint Georges from L'Éstampe modern, no. 11, 1898, colour lithograph
- Born: 13 August 1863
- Died: 1938 (aged 74–75)
- Movement: Symbolism

Jeanne Jacquemin (Marie-Jeanne Boyer) was a French artist associated with the Symbolist movement. She was born on 13 August 1863 in Paris and died in Paris in 1938. She married Édouard Jacquemin, but later left him to live with the engraver Auguste Lauzet, a friend of Vincent Van Gogh.

== Personal life ==
She married Édouard Paul Félicien Jacquemin, a member of Paul Verlaine's circle, on December 13, 1881. Édouard ultimately abandoned her, and some time later she moved in with the engraver August-Marie Lauzet. Details of her personal life were mired in controversy and misinformation during her lifetime. Leslie Stewart Curtis has claimed that, "If Jacquemin and her art have been largely forgotten, it is no doubt related to the infamy she had acquired among her art world contemporaries. In fact, there is evidence to suggest that she was consciously expunged from written records." However, this can also be attributed, in part, to the relatively scarcity of her surviving works.

== Career ==
Information about her artistic training remains unclear. She has been linked to the little-known artists Léonide Josephine Leblanc, Jean-Charles Cazin, Edouard Pils, and Léon Bonnat. Jacquemin exhibited approximately 40 works during her lifetime, most of which were executed in pastel and few of which are extant today. She exhibited at Le Barc de Boutteville gallery in Paris between 1892 and 1897, at the Impressionist and Symbolist exhibitions, at the Salon de La Plume and the galerie Bing. In Brussels, Octave Maus invited her to exhibit at the Salon des XX. During her time there, she associated with Georges Rodenbach. At Le Barc de Boutteville, she became affiliated with Alfred Vallette and Remy du Gourmont.

== Work ==
Jacquemin's art was influenced by Puvis de Chavannes, Edward Burne-Jones, Odilon Redon, and Gustave Moreau. Describing the works she exhibited in the 1894 "Peintres Impressionistes et Symbolistes" exhibition at Le Barc de Boutteville, the critic René Barjean wrote that "the emotional intensity of the faces explored by Madame Jeanne Jacquemin enchants and will always enchant the poets." Her work, like that of her Symbolist contemporaries, addresses mysticism, dream states, nature, and la douleur, or pain. The particular brand of isolation and otherworldliness found in her works coincides with an ambivalent figuration of gender. Her treatment of the "female androgyne" has been associated with the efforts of female Symbolist artists to explore psychic states "not confined to masculine sensibilities," but that do not necessarily put forward a counter-model of "essentialized female sensibility."

Her portrait of Saint Georges, for example, has been interpreted by some as a self-portrait, due in part to the figure's delicate facial features and long red hair.

Her works include:

- La Douloureuse et glorieuse couronne (The Crown of Thorns) (pastel on paper, 1892, private collection, Paris)
- Le Coeur d'eau (pastel on paper, 1892, Musée de Folklore at Maison Tournaisienne)
- Christ à la couronne d'épines (lithograph published in Le Courrier Français, Jun 23, 1895)
- Saint Georges (color lithograph published in L'Éstampe modern no. 11, 1898)
- Le Temps passe or "Rêverie" (alternately titled Daydream, Mélancolie, and Mysteriosa), a signed worm that has been included in several Symbolist exhibitions in recent decades, Paris, collection Jean-David Jumeau-Lafond.
- Saint Georges (pastel on paper) 1892, Paris, collection Jean-David Jumeau-Lafond.

== Bibliography ==
Jean-David Jumeau-Lafond, "Jeanne Jacquemin", Les Peintres de l'âme. Le symbolisme idéaliste en France, Anvers, Pandora, 1999.

Jean-David Jumeau-Lafond, "Jeanne Jacquemin, peintre et égérie symboliste", Revue de l'art, 2003, 3, p. 57-78.

Jean-David Jumeau-Lafond, "Jeanne Jacquemin", Painters of the soul. Symbolism in France, Exh. cat. Tampere, 2007.

Jean-David Jumeau-Lafond, "Un chef d'oeuvre retrouvé, Le Coeur de l'eau de Jeanne Jacquemin, La Tribune de l'art, 9 décembre 2014.
