= Noël Clément-Janin =

French writer & art critic (1862–1947)

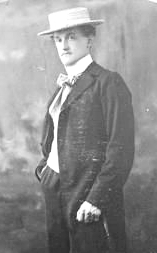
- Born: 25 November 1862; Dijon, France
- Died: 6 May 1947 (aged 84); Paris, France
- Occupation: Write & art critic
- Relatives: Jules Janin

Hilaire Noël Sébastien Clément, known as Clément-Janin (1862–1947) was a French writer and art critic, specializing in the modern history of printmaking.

== Biography ==
His father, Michel-Hilaire Clément (1831–1885), was the author of several books on local history and traditions. Through his mother, Marie-Camille, he was related to the critic, Jules Janin. His first literary activities involved the posthumous publication of some of his father's works, and then donating his archives to the Musée d'Ethnographie du Trocadéro. The name "Clément-Janin" was also originally used by his father.

In the mid-1890s, he became attracted to the Positivist milieu, making the acquaintance of Édouard Pelletan, and joining him in the process of establishing his publishing house, which was inaugurated in 1896. It was during this time that he developed an interest in engraving and the art of illustration. Later, Pelletan would entrust him to collaborate with André Mellerio in the management of his magazine, L'Estampe et l'affiche

In 1908, he was named curator and conservator of the modern prints department at the newly established Bibliothèque d’Art et d’Archéologie, initiated by the fashion designer, Jacques Doucet, who was also an art patron and collector. In 1915, he was a co-founder of "Les Amis des artistes", a mutual aid fund for artists in need.

During World War I, in 1917, he made the first attempt to classify and organize the war's iconography; listing nearly 10,000 prints. After the war, in 1919, he was named a Knight in the Legion of Honor for his work.

One of his last works was the Essai sur la bibliophilie contemporaine, issued in two volumes by René Kieffer, in 1931 and 1932.
