= Charles Guilloux =

French painter

Charles-Victor Guilloux
- Born: 15 December 1866; Paris, France
- Died: 7 April 1946 (aged 79); Lormes, France

Charles-Victor Guilloux (1866–1946) was a French Symbolist artist.

== Biography ==
Guilloux was born in Paris in 1866 and died in Lormes, Nièvre, in 1946.

An employee of the Bibliothèque Nationale in Paris, Guilloux was a self-taught artist who critics like Albert Aurier, Félix Fénéon, and Rémy de Gourmont liken to the time of the Symbolist movement. From 1891, his works were successfully received at the exhibitions of the Société des artistes indépendants, and then at the "Impressionists and Symbolists" exhibitions at the gallery of Le Barc de Boutteville.

Very soon, the titles of his paintings appear more elliptical, sometimes tinged with musical connotations (Scherzo Moon, 1894, location unknown), while the origin of his motifs becomes less and less identifiable.

This structuring of space and the distribution of forms and colors on which André Mellerio (1862–1943) commented in his idealist movement in painting (1896), are found in many works painted by Guilloux: Moonrise over a Channel (Mills, Anne de Beaujeu Museum) or Landscape at Dusk (Beauvais, Musée de l'Oise département).

He exhibited at the Salon de la Société nationale des Beaux-Arts in 1905, and at the Salon des Indépendants between 1911 and 1914. In 2007, the Musée d'Orsay bought his painting Crépuscule (Twilight)

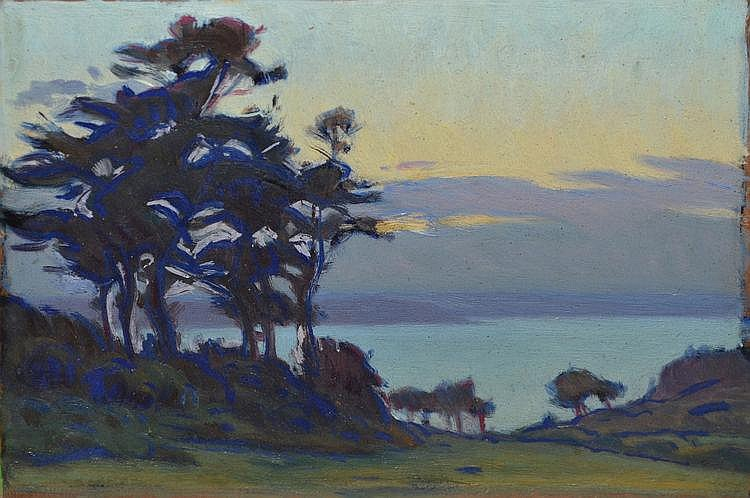
Landscape

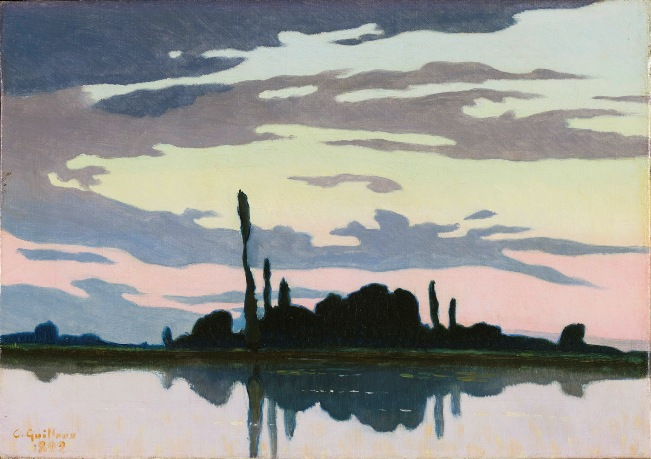
Twilight, 1892, Paris, Musée d'Orsay.

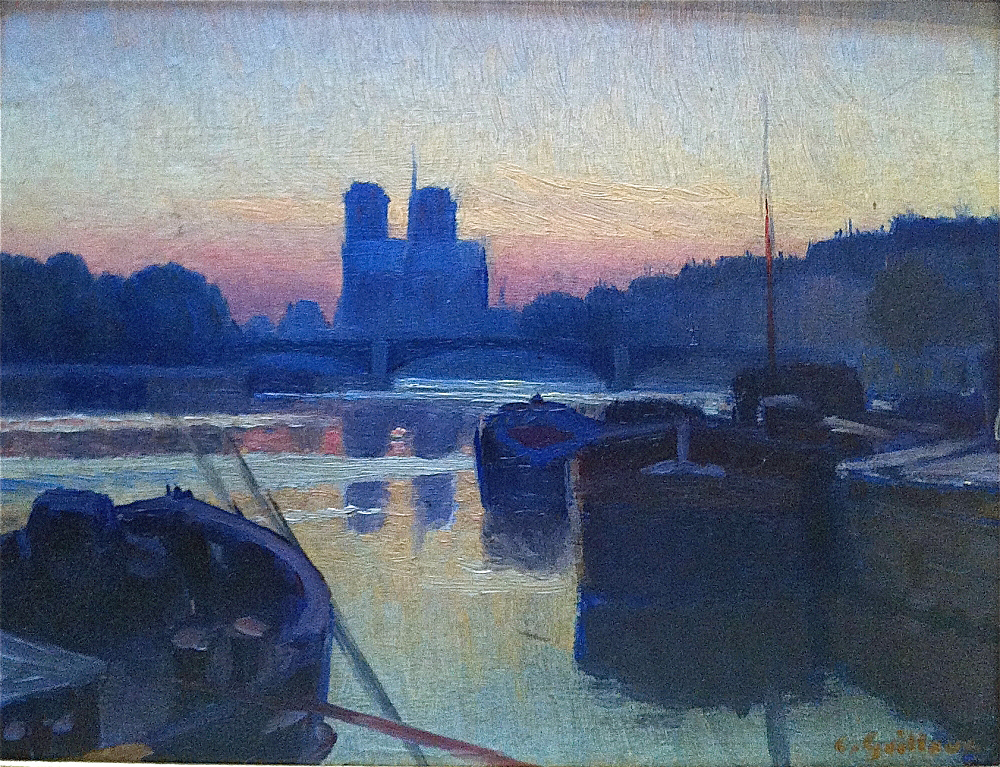
Notre Dame au crépuscule, ca 1898

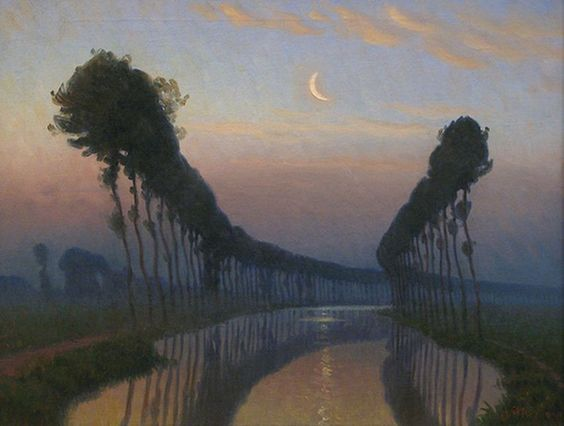
L'allée d'eau, ca 1895
