= André Mellerio =

French art critic (1862–1943)

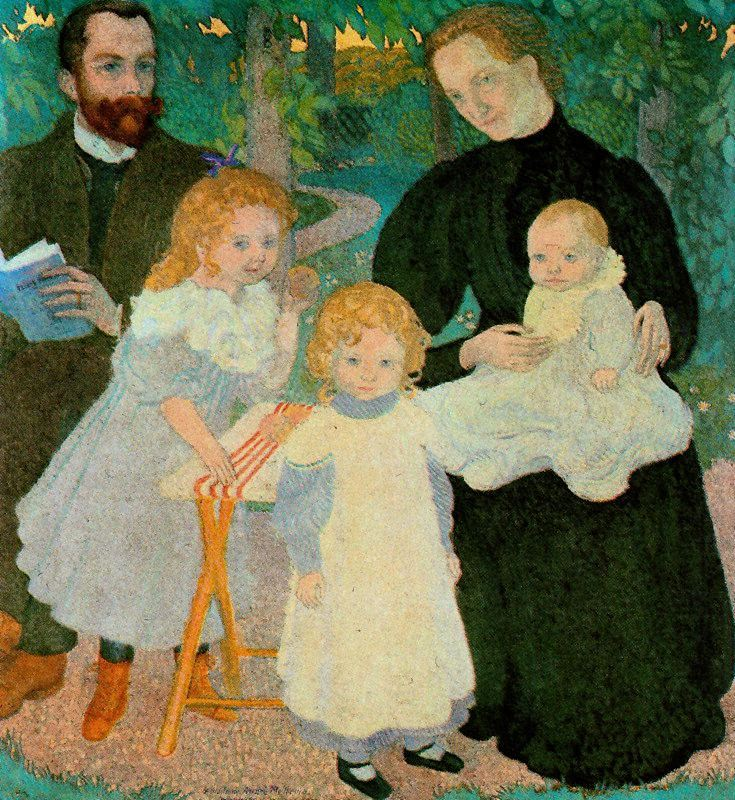
André Mellerio in The Mellerio Family by Maurice Denis, 1897. Oil on canvas. Musée d'Orsay, Paris.

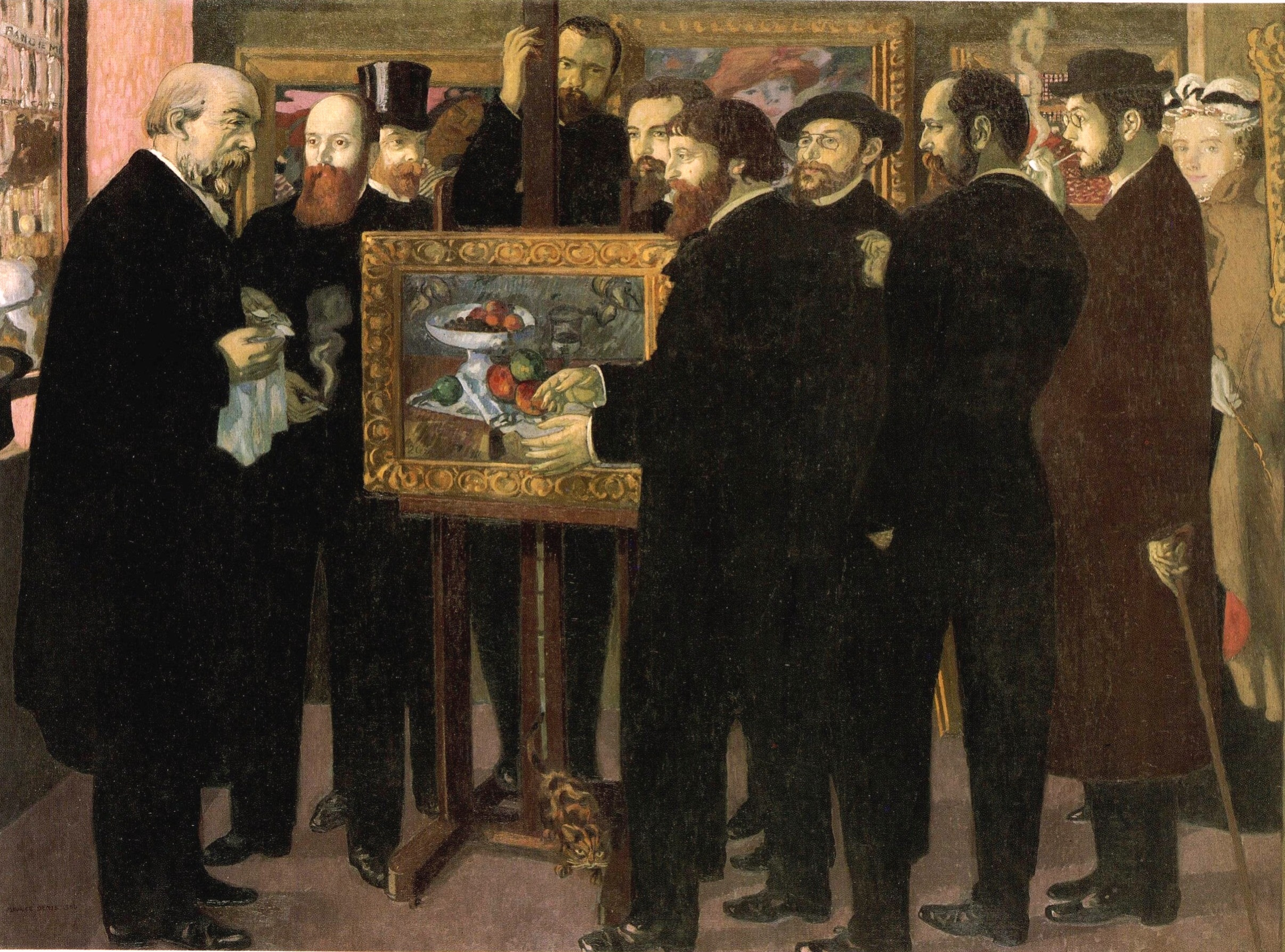
Homage to Cézanne, Maurice Denis, 1900. Oil on canvas. Musée d'Orsay, Paris. Mellerio is third from the left, wearing a top hat.

André Mellerio (1862–1943) was a French art critic who promoted the cause of Symbolism and "idealist" art and appeared in two pictures by Maurice Denis. He was the biographer, and great friend, of Odilon Redon.

== Family background ==
Mellerio was a member of the family that owns the Parisian Mellerio dits Meller jewellery firm, which is believed to be the world's oldest jeweller as well as Europe's oldest family-owned company. As of 2013, it was celebrating its 400th anniversary, having been founded in northern Italy in 1613, and is in its 14th generation of family ownership and continuous operation.

Mellerio married Isabelle Leroux, and they had three daughters, Thérèse (1892–?), Marcel (1894–?) and Marthe (1896–?), all shown in the 1897 painting by Denis.

== Idealist art ==
Mellerio elaborated the rise of "idealist art" in Le Mouvement idéaliste en peinture, published in Paris in 1896. He traced the emergence of the form to the Exposition des Peintres du Groupe Impressionniste et Synthétiste of the Pont-Aven group at the Café Volpini in Paris, 1889, and attributed its origins to Gustave Moreau, Paul Gauguin, Pierre Puvis de Chavannes and Odilon Redon.

== Odilon Redon ==
Mellerio was a particular promoter of Redon, whom he first met in 1889. He wrote the preface to the catalogue for the exhibition of Redon's work at the Durand Ruel gallery in 1894. Mellerio claimed that Redon was unusual among modern artists in not belonging to any group.

In Mellerio's catalogue of Redon's graphic work, published in 1913, Mellerio described Redon as a "mystic" who sought to show the "vague unknown that we sense beneath contingent appearances."

== Papers ==
Mellerio's papers, which include a great deal of biographical information about Redon, are now in the Ryerson and Burnham Archives at the Art Institute of Chicago, who purchased them from a dealer in 1991.

== Publications ==
Mellerio, with Noël Clément-Janin, was the editor in chief of L'Estampe et l'Affiche, an illustrated art magazine (Paris, 1897-1899).

- Le Mouvement idéaliste en peinture. Paris, 1896.
- La Lithographie originale en couleurs. Paris, Editions de l'Estampe et l'Affiche, 1898.
- Odilon Redon. Paris, Secretariat, 1913.
- Odilon Redon: Peintre, dessinateur et graveur. Paris, Henri Floury, 1923.
