= Monti (surname) =

Monti is an Italian surname. Notable people with the surname include:

- Bruno Monti (1930–2011), Italian cyclist
- Carlo Monti (1920–2016), Italian athlete
- Eleonora Monti (1727 – after 1760), Italian painter
- Eugenio Monti (1928–2003), Italian bobsledder
- Francesco Monti (Bologna) (1683–1768), Italian painter
- Francesco Monti (il Brescianino) (1646–1712), Italian painter
- Gaetano Monti, Italian sculptor
- Gaetano Monti (composer), Italian composer
- Gaetano Matteo Monti, Italian sculptor
- Giovanni Battista Monti, Italian painter
- Jared C. Monti, American soldier
- Katherine Monti, American statistician
- Luis Monti, Argentine-Italian footballer
- Mario Monti, former Prime Minister of Italy
- Martin James Monti (1921–2000), U.S. Army Air Forces pilot, defector and Axis propagandist
- Massimo Monti (born 1962), Italian racing driver
- Michele Monti (1970–2018), Italian judoka
- Peter Monti, American psychologist
- Raffaele Monti (filmmaker) (born 1981), Italian film director
- Rafaelle Monti (sculptor) (1818–1881), Italian sculptor
- Urbano Monti (1544–1613), Italian cartographer.
- Vincenzo Monti, Italian neoclassical poet and scholar
- Vittorio Monti, Italian composer

== See also ==
- Monte (name), given name and surname
- Monti (given name)
- Montie, given name and surname
- Monty, given name and surname
