= Monte =

Monte may refer to:

== Places ==
=== Argentina ===
- Argentine Monte, an ecoregion
- Monte Desert
- Monte Partido, a partido in Buenos Aires Province

=== Italy ===
- Monte Bregagno
- Monte Cassino
- Montecorvino (disambiguation)
- Montefalcione

=== Portugal ===
- Monte (Funchal), a civil parish in the municipality of Funchal
- Monte, a civil parish in the municipality of Fafe
- Monte, a civil parish in the municipality of Murtosa
- Monte, a civil parish in the municipality of Terras de Bouro

=== Elsewhere ===
- Monte, Haute-Corse, a commune in Corsica, France
- Monte, Switzerland, a village in the municipality Castel San Pietro, Ticino, Switzerland
- Monte, U.S. Virgin Islands, a neighborhood
- Monte Lake, British Columbia, Canada

== Arts, entertainment, and media ==
- Monte (film), a 2016 drama film by Amir Naderi
- Three-card Monte
- Monte Bank or Monte, a card game

== Other uses ==
- Monte (dessert) a milk cream dessert produced by the German dairy company Zott
- Monte (mascot), the mascot of the University of Montana
- Monte (name), including a list of people with the name
- Monte (hair product), a texturizing tool for male hair

== See also ==
- Del Monte (disambiguation)
- El Monte, California, United States
- El Monte, Chile
- La Monte, Missouri, United States
- LaMonte, a given name and surname
- Mont (disambiguation)
- Montes (disambiguation)
- Monte Berico, a cathedral in Vicenza, Italy
- Monte Carlo, Monaco
- Monte Cristo (disambiguation)
- Monti (disambiguation)
- Montie (disambiguation)
- Monty (disambiguation)
