= Monti =

Monti may refer to:

== People ==
- Monti (given name)
- Monti (surname)

== Places ==
- Monti, Lazio, the first rione (historic district) of Rome, Italy
- Monti, Sardinia, Italy, a comune and town
- Monti, Iowa, United States, a town

== See also ==
- Monte (disambiguation)
- Montie (disambiguation)
- Monty (disambiguation)
