= Clelia =

Clelia may refer to:

- Clelia (given name) (includes a list of people with the name)
- Cloelia, a legendary Roman figure
- Clelia curve, an algebraic curve
- Clelia (snake), a genus of snakes
