= Monte (name) =

Monte is a given name and surname. Notable people with the name include:

== Given name or nickname ==
- Monte Attell (1885–1960), American world champion bantamweight boxer
- Monte Cazazza (1949–2023), American artist and composer
- Monte Collins (1898–1951), American actor and screenwriter
- Monte Cook (born 1968), American game designer and writer, best known for his work on Dungeons & Dragons
- Monte Hellman (1932–2021), American film director, producer, writer and editor
- Monte Irvin (1919–2016), Negro league and Major League Baseball player, member of the Baseball Hall of Fame
- Monte Kay (1924–1988), American musicians' agent and record producer
- Monte M. Katterjohn (1891–1949), American screenwriter
- Monte Kiffin (1940–2024), American football coach
- Monte Landis (born 1933), Scottish-American actor
- Monte Ledbetter (1943–2020), American football player
- Monte Lipman, American music industry executive and film producer
- Monte Markham (born 1935), American actor
- Monte McNaughton (born 1977), Canadian politician
- Monte Melkonian (1957–1993), Armenian militant, revolutionary and military commander
- Monte Merkel (1916–1981), American football player
- Monte Money (born 1986), American guitarist and vocalist, former lead guitarist of the American post-hardcore band Escape the Fate
- Monte Montgomery (born 1966), American guitarist and singer-songwriter
- Monte Morris (born 1995), American professional basketball player
- Monte Pittman (born 1975), American musician known largely as Madonna's long-time guitarist
- Monté Ross (born 1970), American college basketball head coach
- Monte Scheinblum (born 1967), American golfer, 1992 US & World Long Drive Champion
- Monte Solberg (born 1958), Canadian politician
- Monte Waterbury (1876–1920), American businessman and polo player

== Surname ==
- Adrián Di Monte (born 1990), Cuban actor and singer
- Eric Monte (born 1943), American screenwriter and TV series creator
- Francesco Maria del Monte (1549–1627), Italian cardinal, diplomat, and connoisseur of the arts
- Frank Monte (1931–1982), American mobster
- Guidobaldo del Monte (1545–1607), Italian mathematician, philosopher and astronomer
- Herkus Monte (died 1273), a leader of the Great Prussian Uprising against the Teutonic Knights and Northern Crusaders
- José Luis Alvarez del Monte, Uruguayan chess master
- Lou Monte (1917–1989), Italian-American singer
- Marisa Monte (born 1967), Brazilian singer, composer, instrumentalist, and producer
- Nélson Monte (born 1995), Portuguese footballer
- Peter Del Monte (1943–2021), Italian film director and screenwriter
- Philippe de Monte (1521–1603), Renaissance composer
- Pierre de Monte (1499–1572), Italian Grandmaster of the Order of Saint John
- Urbano Monte, another name for Urbano Monti

== See also ==
- Monti (given name)
- Monti (surname)
- Montie, given name and surname
- Monty, given name and surname
