= Montes =

Montes may refer to:

- Montes (surname), includes a list of people with the name
- Montes, an early name of Mons, Belgium
- Montes (planetary nomenclature), mountains on celestial bodies
- Montes, West Virginia, United States, an unincorporated community
- Montes, Uruguay, a village
- Montes, one of the Comarcas of Ciudad Real in Spain
- Montes (journal), a Spanish scientific forestry journal

== See also ==
- Monte (disambiguation)
- Montes-Bradley
