= Monty (disambiguation) =

Monty is a masculine given name and nickname and also occasionally a surname.

Monty may also refer to:

== Music ==
- Monty (singer) or Jacques Bulostin (born 1943), French singer and songwriter
- Monty (rapper) or Angel Cosme Jr. (born 1990), American rapper
- Monty Oxymoron (born 1961), stage name of Laurence Burrow, keyboardist for the English punk rock group The Damned
- "Monty" (song), a song by Spiderbait

== Other uses ==
- Monty (comic strip), an American comic strip
- Monty (robot), a two-wheeled balancing humanoid robot
- Monty (TV series), a short-lived Fox sitcom
- Cyclone Monty, a storm that made landfall in Western Australia in 2004
- Monty Python, a British comedy troup

== See also ==
- Monte (disambiguation)
- Monti (disambiguation)
- Montie (disambiguation)
