= Giammaria Ortes =

Italian composer and mathematician (1713–1790)

Reverend Giammaria Ortes
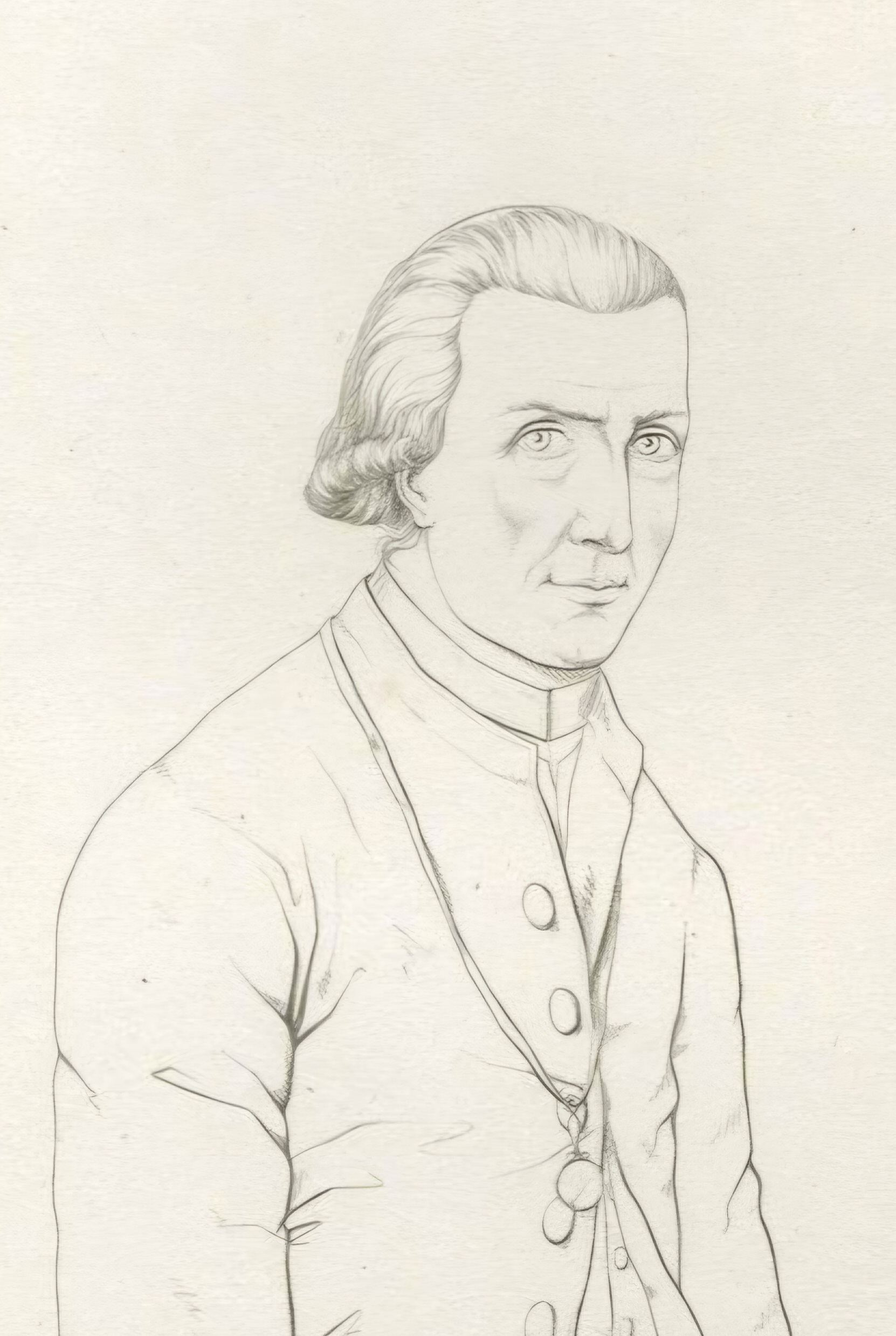
- Giammaria Ortes
- Born: March 2, 1713; Venice, Republic of Venice
- Died: 22 July 1790 (aged 77); Venice, Republic of Venice
- Occupations: Camaldulese monk; Catholic priest; Economist; Philosopher; Mathematician
- Known for: having anticipated certain doctrines of Adam Smith and Thomas Robert Malthus
- Title: abbot
- Parent(s): Giacomo Ortes; Angela Ortes

Academic background
- Influences: Petty; Newton; Conti; Toland; Grandi; Pope; Rousseau

Academic work
- Discipline: Political economy, political philosophy
- School or tradition: Classical economics
- Influenced: Buonarroti; Custodi; Marx

Abbé Giovanni Maria Ortes O.S.B. Cam. (2 March 1713 – 22 July 1790) was a Venetian composer, economist, mathematician, Camaldolese monk, and philosopher. Ortes was one of the more renowned pre-Smithian Italian economists. He is better known for his population predictions that preceded those of Malthus.

Ortes belonged to the Camaldolese monastic order. When he was thirty, however, he left the cloister and for the remainder of his life he was an abbé, dressed as a priest and fiercely loyal to the Church, but living with his family or friends and giving all of his time to scholarship and writing.

Ortes was probably the first person, according to Adam Ferguson, to use the term "economics" for the science in which he exercised a remarkable activity, particularly in his works Economia Nazionale (1774) and Riflessioni sulla popolazione (1790), which along with other of his works were reprinted in Pietro Custodi's anthology Scrittori classici italiani di economia politica (1802–16). He was opposed to mercantilism.

He anticipated certain doctrines of Adam Smith and Thomas Robert Malthus, especially the latter, as he felt that the population propagation, if it were allowed free rein, would take place in a geometric progression with a doubling every 30 years. These views were expounded in his Riflessioni sulla popolazione delle nazioni per rapporto all'economia nazionale (Reflections on the Population of Nations in respect to National Economy), published in 1790.

== Life and works ==
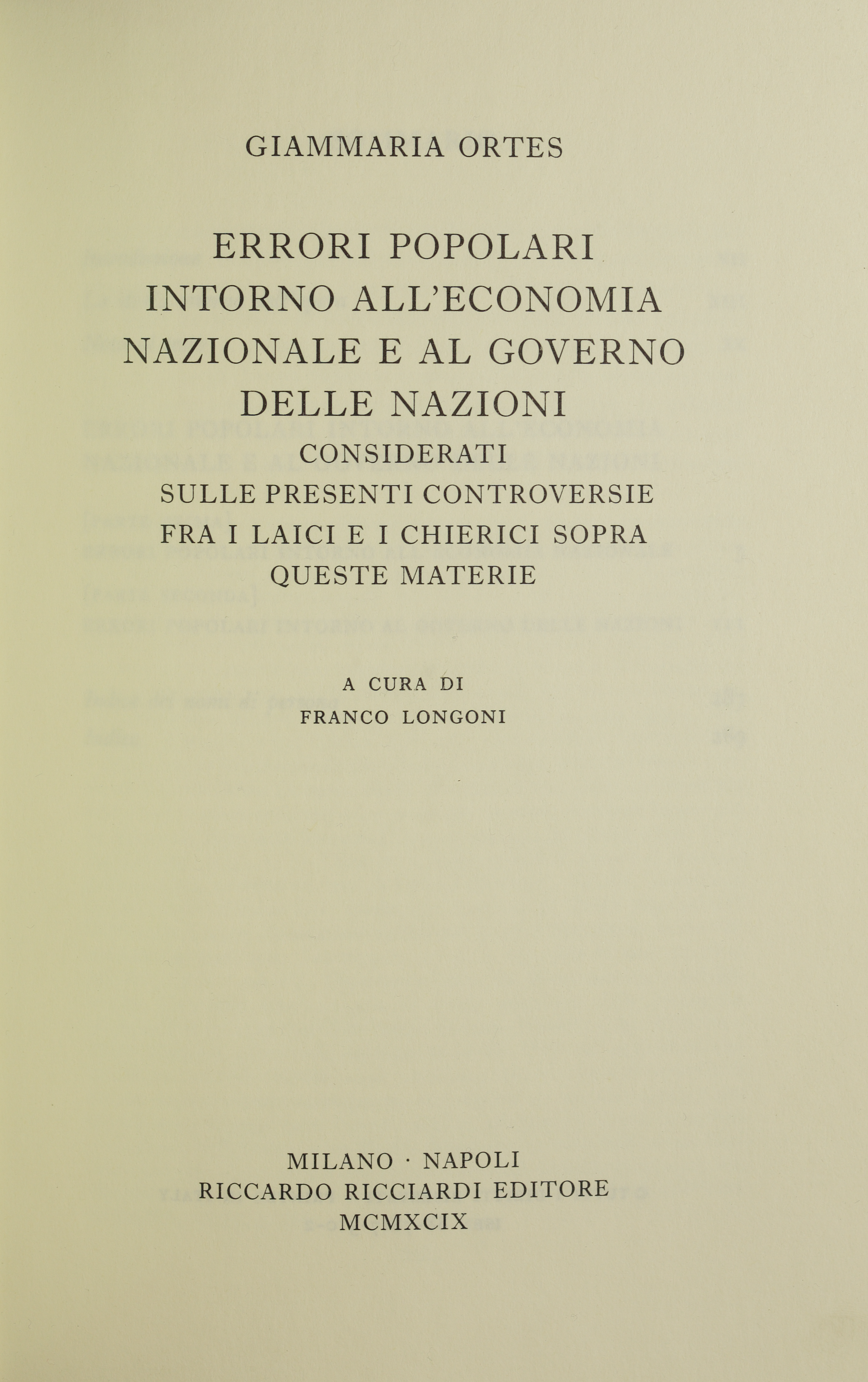
Errori popolari intorno all'Economia nazionale e al governo delle nazioni, 1999

Giammaria Ortes was born in Venice on 2 March 1713. His father, Giacomo, owned a glass manufacture. In 1727 he joined the Camaldolese order and in 1734 he went to Pisa, where he studied Mathematics and Philosophy under the guidance of Luigi Guido Grandi. Ortes left his cloister on the entreaties of his mother after his father’s death, but remained in holy orders and was ever a strenuous defender of the clergy. It is with this purpose that he wrote his Errori popolari intorno all’Economia nazionale, his Lettere sulla Religione and his treatise Dei fidecommessi a famiglie e a chiese e luoghi pii, with the scope of upholding the existence of clerical property in mortmain and of refuting the criticism voiced by those Enlightenment writers who strongly opposed the extended landed properties of the Church.

In his Economia Nazionale (vols. XXI, XXII and XXIII of Pietro Custodi’s Scrittori classici italiani di Economia Politica, Milan, 1802-1816) Ortes endeavors to demonstrate that as “the wealth of a nation is determined by the (previous) wants of its members, the riches of one of them cannot increase unless at the expense of another one; the bulk of existing riches is in each nation measured by its wants, and cannot by any means whatever exceed this measure” (Discorso Preliminare). From this rather startling proposition, Ortes, who certainly was an original thinker, deduces the condemnation of the principles on which mercantilism was based. “Money is only a sign of wealth, and must never be considered as being wealth itself. The error of those who mistake money for wealth, proceeds from a confusion between the equivalent of a thing and the thing itself, or between two equivalents which they consider as identical things, although they are not” (ch. IX).

In his Riflessioni sulla Popolazione (Venice, 1790, and vol. XXIV of Custodi) Ortes controverts the prevailing opinion that an increase of population must necessarily increase the wealth of a nation, and maintains that ‘‘in any nation whatever the population is compelled to keep within fixed limits, which are invariably determined by the necessity of providing for its subsistence” (Prefazione). In his very first chapter he asserts that, if natural instincts were allowed full play, population would increase in a geometrical progression (doubling every 30 years), and calculates that a group of 7 persons composed of three old people, two young men and two young women of 20, would be the ancestors at the end of 150 years of 224 living persons; at the end of 300 years of 7,168 living persons; at the end of 450 years of 229,376 living persons; at the end of 900 years of 7,516,192,768 living persons. Sheer violence keeps down the numbers of animals within the necessary limits, but among men, “generation is limited by reason” (ch. III), especially by voluntary celibacy, which affords Ortes an occasion of extolling the provident discipline of the Roman Catholic Church. Ortes is a harbinger of Malthus; first by his law of the geometrical increase of population, and secondly by the influence which he ascribes to human reason as a prudential check against overpopulation.

Ortes was a fervent mathematical student, and expresses himself in algebraical formulae in his Calcolo sopra il Valore dell’Opinioni umane (vol. XXIV Custodi). In the same work he illustrates his meaning by curves, which, if not actually traced, are at least minutely described.

== Legacy ==
Ortes is undoubtedly the most eminent of the Venetian economists of the 18th century; his genius — original and sometimes paradoxical, is often opposed to the general tendency of the ideas of his time, and though his researches are occasionally faulty in their method, he has left a deep impress on the history of economic theory. He regards economic laws as immutable, like those of nature; he maintains this in opposition to the opinion usually accepted in his time, which regarded economics only in relation to special interests. Perhaps it is this idea which leads him to distrust the action of the state, considering it not adapted to promote the wealth of a country.

While Ortes applied a mathematical method to economics, his arguments are based throughout on abstract theory, disregarding the study both of facts and of history as not appertaining to economic science. This detracts from the value of his labors. Still his works are of weight in the history of economic theory. He did not adopt the doctrines of the Physiocrats, and he also recognizes the importance of division of labour, and the important place taken by production in economic theory. Contrary to the prevailing ideas of his day, Ortes upholds universal free exchange.

== Works ==
- Vita del padre D. Guido Grandi, abate camaldolese, matematico dello Studio Pisano. Venice: Giambatista Pasquali. 1744.
- Dell'economia nazionale. Venice. 1774.
- Ortes, Giammaria (1780). Della religione e del governo dei popoli per rapporto agli spiriti bizzarri e increduli de' tempi presenti. Venice.
- Saggio della filosofia degli antichi, esposto in versi per musica. Venice. 1757.
- Dei fidecommessi a famiglie e a chiese e luoghi pii. Venice. 1784.
- Riflessioni sulla popolazione delle nazioni per rapporto all'economia nazionale. Venice. 1790. OCLC 65337492.
- Errori popolari intorno all'economia nazionale e al governo delle nazioni. Milan: Ricciardi. 1999.
- Riccardo Donati, ed. (2007). Saggio della filosofia degli antichi, esposto in versi per musica [Essay on the philosophy of the ancients, written in verse for music]. Genoa: San Marco dei Giustiniani. ISBN 9788874942008.

== Bibliography ==
- Palgrave, Robert Harry Inglis (1913). Dictionary of political economy. London : Macmillan. This article incorporates text from this source, which is in the public domain.
- Lampertico, Fedele (1865). Giammaria Ortes e la Scienza Economica al suo tempo. Venice and Turin: G. Antonelli e L. Basadonna.
- Errera, Alberto (1877). Storia dell'Economia Politica nella Repubblica Veneta. Venice. pp. 92–156.
- Gobbi, Ulisse (1884). La Concorrenza Estera e gli antichi Economisti Italiani. Milan. pp. 197–202.
- Cossa, Luigi (1892). Introduzione allo studio dell'economia politica. Milan: Hoepli. pp. 188–189, 305–306.
- Gonnard, René (1904). "Un précurseur de Malthus: Giammaria Ortès". Revue d'économie Politique. 18 (8/9): 638–666. JSTOR 24680353.
- Uggé, Albino (1928). "La teoria della popolazione di Giammaria Ortes". Giornale degli Economisti e Rivista di Statistica. 68 (1): 35–74. JSTOR 23227086.
- Sauvy, Alfred (1959). "Deux techniciens, précurseurs de Malthus, Boesnier de l'Orme et Auxiron". Population. 10 (4): 691–704. doi:10.2307/1525259. JSTOR 1525259.
- Prandi, Alfonso (1966). "Giammaria Ortes: la religione fondamento della società". Religiosità e cultura nel '700 italiano. Bologna: 379–435.
- Torcellan, Gianfranco (1969). Un économiste du XVIIIe siècle, Giammaria Ortes. Genève: Droz. ISBN 9782600040532.
- Overbeek, Hans (1970). "Un démographe prémalthusien au XVIIIe siècle: Giammaria Ortes". Population. 25 (3): 563–572. doi:10.2307/1530103. JSTOR 1530103.
- Erba, Alighiero (2011). "Economic structure and national accounting: G. Ortes' contribution to economic science". History of Economic Ideas. 19 (1): 55–83. JSTOR 23723559.
- Del Negro, Piero (2013). "Ortes, Giovanni Maria". Dizionario Biografico degli Italiani (in Italian). Vol. 79: Nursio–Ottolini Visconti. Rome: Istituto dell'Enciclopedia Italiana. ISBN 978-88-12-00032-6.
- "Giammaria Ortes on the Limits of Population Growth". Population and Development Review. 44 (4): 833–838. 2018. doi:10.1111/padr.12210. JSTOR 45174459. S2CID 239794132.
