= Caterina Medici da Broni =

Italian woman executed for witchcraft

Caterina Medici da Broni (c. 1573–1617) was an Italian woman who was executed for witchcraft.

She worked as a domestic servant for the senator Luigi Melzi of Milan. When Luigi Melzi became ill and died in 1616, she was accused of having caused his illness by use of sorcery. She was accused by a former employer, who had suspected her for sorcery when she was in his employ. The charges were confirmed by the testimony of two doctors, Ludovico Settala and Giovanni Battista Selvatico, who had tended to the patient, and failed in curing him.

She was interrogated by the Inquisition by use of torture. She was judged guilty as charged, and executed by strangulation, after which her body was burned publicly at the stake.

The case of Caterina Medici da Broni became the subject of literature early on. It was described in the history textbook Storia di Milano by Pietro Verri as edited by Pietro Custodi (1771–1842). It was referred to in Promessi by Alessandro Manzoni. It was the subject of the novel by Achille Mauri (1806-1803), as well as the novel “Io sono la strega” by Marina Marazza.
