= Cyclopes =

One-eyed giants in Greek and Roman mythology

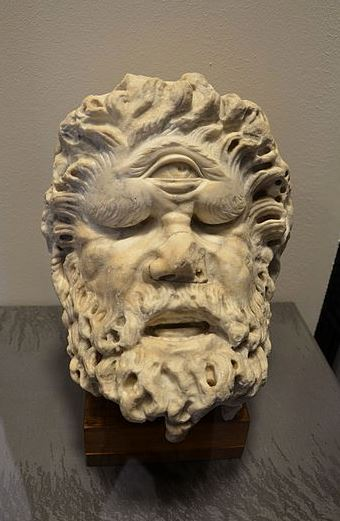
A first century AD head of a Cyclops from the Colosseum of Rome, Italy

In Greek mythology and later Roman mythology, the Cyclopes (/saɪ.ˈkloʊ.piːz/, sy-KLOH-peez; Greek: Κύκλωπες, Kýklōpes, "Circle-eyes" or "Round-eyes"; singular Cyclops /ˈsaɪ.klɒps/, SY-klops; Κύκλωψ, Kýklōps) are giant one-eyed creatures. Three kinds of Cyclopes can be distinguished. In Hesiod's Theogony, the Cyclopes are three brothers—Brontes, Steropes, and Arges—who create Zeus's thunderbolt, Poseidon's trident, and Hades' Helm of Darkness. The Cyclopes of Homer's Odyssey are a group of uncivilized, cave-dwelling shepherds, including Polyphemus, whom Odysseus encounters. A third group of Cyclopes reputedly constructed the Cyclopean walls of Mycenae and Tiryns.

In Cyclops, the fifth-century BC play by Euripides, a chorus of satyrs offers comic relief based on the encounter of Odysseus and Polyphemus. The third-century BC poet Callimachus makes the Hesiodic Cyclopes the assistants of smith-god Hephaestus, as does Virgil in the Latin epic Aeneid, where he seems to equate the Hesiodic and Homeric Cyclopes. From at least the fifth century BC, Cyclopes have been associated with the Italian island of Sicily and the volcanic Aeolian Islands.

== Kinds ==
Three groups of Cyclopes were distinguished by ancient mythographers: the Hesiodic, the Homeric and the wall-builders. In Hesiod's Theogony, the Cyclopes are Brontes, Steropes, and Arges, sons of Uranus and Gaia and creators of Zeus's characteristic weapon, the thunderbolt. In Homer's Odyssey, the Cyclopes are an uncivilized group of shepherds, one of whom, Polyphemus, the son of Poseidon, is encountered by Odysseus. Cyclopes were also said to have been the builders of the Cyclopean walls of Mycenae and Tiryns. A scholiast, quoting the fifth-century BC historian Hellanicus, tells us that, in addition to the Hesiodic Cyclopes (whom the scholiast describes as "the gods themselves"), and the Homeric Cyclopes, there was a third group of Cyclopes: the builders of the walls of Mycenae.

=== Hesiodic Cyclopes ===
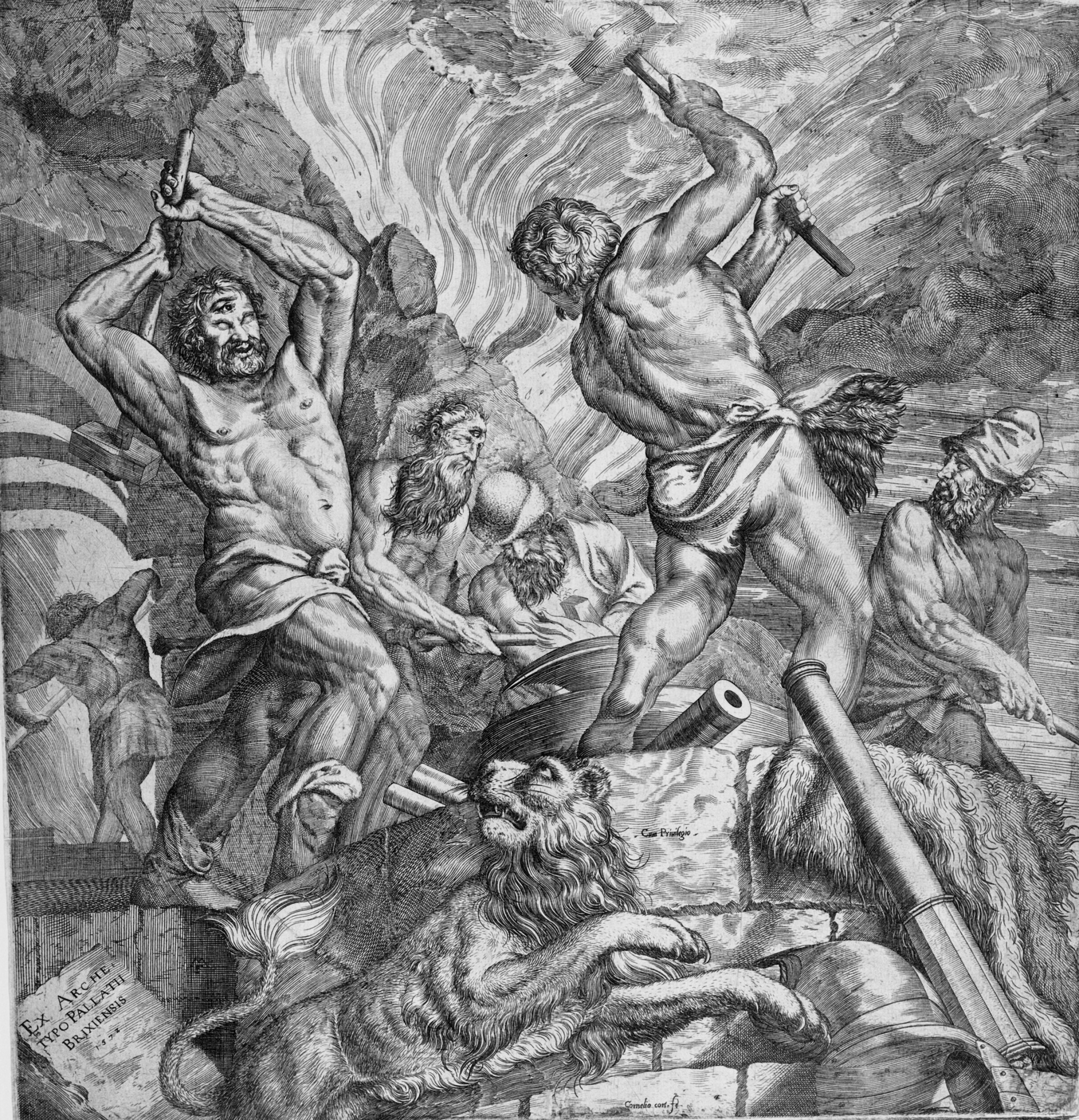
"The Forge of the Cyclopes", a Dutch 16th-century print after a painting by Titian

Hesiod, in the Theogony (c. 700 BC), described three Cyclopes: Brontes, Steropes, and Arges. They were the sons of Uranus (Sky) and Gaia (Earth), and the brothers of the Titans and Hundred-Handers, and had a single eye set in the middle of their foreheads. They made for Zeus his all-powerful thunderbolt, and in so doing, the Cyclopes played a key role in the Greek succession myth, which told how the Titan Cronus overthrew his father Uranus, and how in turn Zeus overthrew Cronus and his fellow Titans, and how Zeus was eventually established as the final and permanent ruler of the cosmos. The names that Hesiod gives them, Arges (Bright), Brontes (Thunder), and Steropes (Lightning), reflect their fundamental role as thunderbolt makers. As early as the late seventh century BC, the Cyclopes could be used by the Spartan poet Tyrtaeus to epitomize extraordinary size and strength.

According to the accounts of Hesiod and the mythographer Apollodorus, the Cyclopes had been imprisoned by their father Uranus. Zeus later freed the Cyclopes, and they repaid him by giving him the thunderbolt. The Cyclopes provided for Hesiod, and other theogony-writers, a convenient source of heavenly weaponry, since the smith-god Hephaestus—who would eventually take over that role—had not yet been born. According to Apollodorus, the Cyclopes also provided Poseidon with his trident and Hades with his cap of invisibility, and the gods used these weapons to defeat the Titans.

Although the primordial Cyclopes of the Theogony were presumably immortal (as were their brothers the Titans), the sixth-century BC Hesiodic Catalogue of Women, has them being killed by Apollo. Later sources tell us why: Apollo's son Asclepius had been killed by Zeus' thunderbolt, and Apollo killed the Cyclopes, the makers of the thunderbolt, in revenge. According to a scholiast on Euripides' Alcestis, the fifth-century BC mythographer Pherecydes supplied the same motive, but said that Apollo, rather than killing the Cyclopes, killed their sons (one of whom he named Aortes) instead. No other source mentions any offspring of the Cyclopes. A Pindar fragment suggests that Zeus himself killed the Cyclopes to prevent them from making thunderbolts for anyone else.

The Cyclopes' prowess as craftsmen is stressed by Hesiod who says "strength and force and contrivances were in their works." Being such skilled craftsmen of great size and strength, later poets, beginning with the third-century BC poet Callimachus, imagine these Cyclopes, the primordial makers of Zeus' thunderbolt, becoming the assistants of the smith-god Hephaestus, at his forge in Sicily, underneath Mount Etna, or perhaps the nearby Aeolian Islands. In his Hymn to Artemis, Callimachus has the Cyclopes on the Aeolian island of Lipari, working "at the anvils of Hephaestus", make the bows and arrows used by Apollo and Artemis. The first-century BC Latin poet Virgil, in his epic Aeneid, has the Cyclopes: "Brontes and Steropes and bare-limbed Pyracmon" toil under the direction of Vulcan (Hephaestus), in caves underneath Mount Etna and the Aeolian islands. Virgil describes the Cyclopes, in Vulcan's smithy forging iron, making a thunderbolt, a chariot for Mars, and Pallas's Aegis, with Vulcan interrupting their work to command the Cyclopes to fashion arms for Aeneas. The later Latin poet Ovid also has the Hesiodic Cyclopes, Brontes and Steropes (along with a third Cyclops named Acmonides), work at forges in Sicilian caves.

According to a Hellenistic astral myth, the Cyclopes were the builders of the first altar. The myth was a catasterism, which explained how the constellation the Altar (Ara) came to be in the heavens. According to the myth, the Cyclopes built an altar upon which Zeus and the other gods swore alliance before their war with the Titans. After their victory, "the gods placed the altar in the sky in commemoration", and thus began the practice, according to the myth, of men swearing oaths upon altars "as a guarantee of their good faith".

According to the second-century geographer Pausanias, there was a sanctuary called the "altar of the Cyclopes" on the Isthmus of Corinth at a place sacred to Poseidon, where sacrifices were offered to the Cyclopes. There is no evidence for any other cult associated with the Cyclopes. According to a version of the story in the Iliad scholia (found nowhere else), when Zeus swallowed Metis, she was pregnant with Athena by the Cyclops Brontes.

Although described by Hesiod as "having very violent hearts" (ὑπέρβιον ἦτορ ἔχοντας), and while their extraordinary size and strength would have made them capable of great violence, there is no indication of the Hesiodic Cyclopes having behaved in any other way than as dutiful servants of the gods.

Walter Burkert suggests that groups or societies of lesser gods, like the Hesiodic Cyclopes, "mirror real cult associations (thiasoi) ... It may be surmised that smith guilds lie behind Cabeiri, Idaian Dactyloi, Telchines, and Cyclopes."

=== Homeric Cyclopes ===
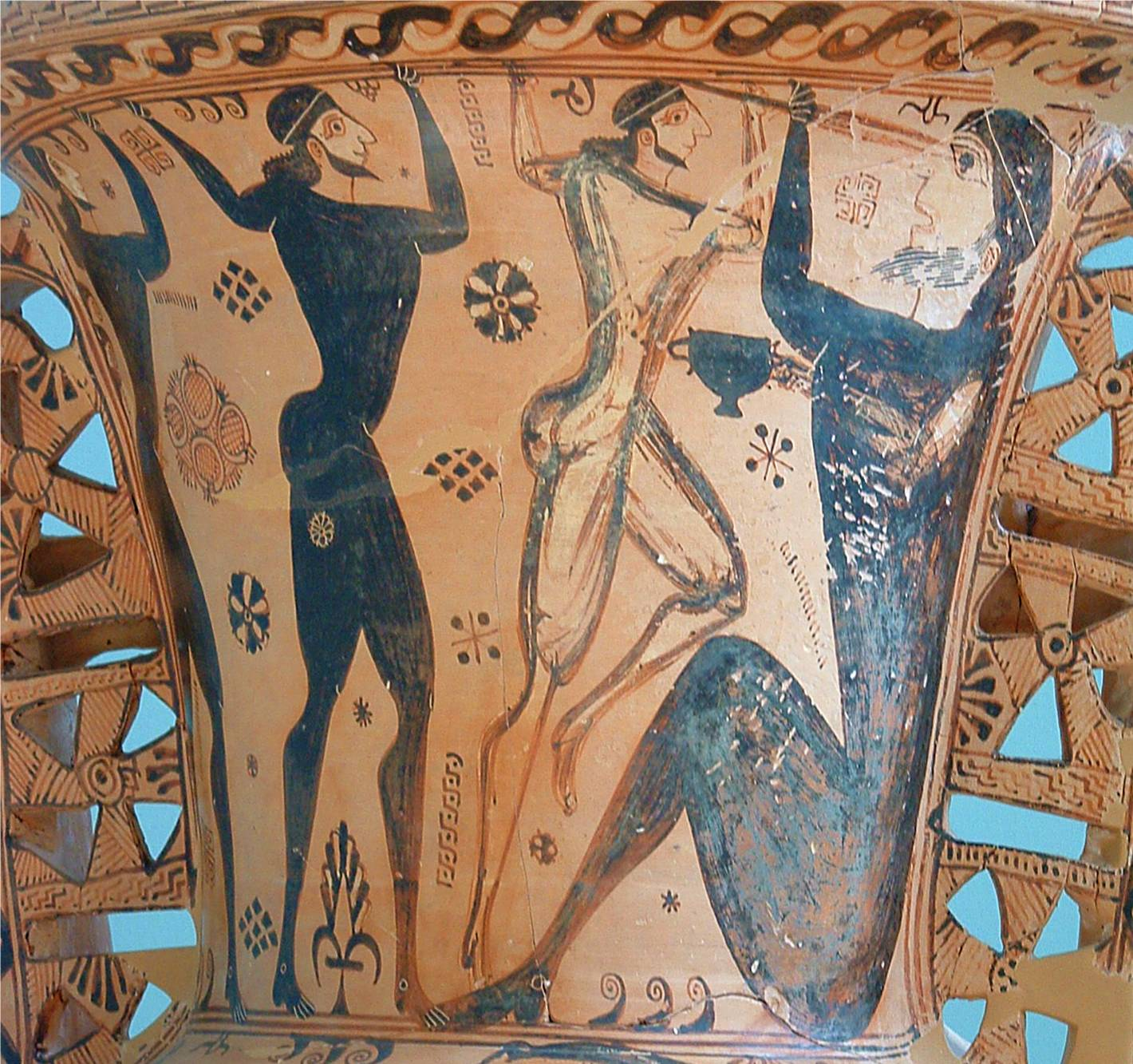
Odysseus and his crew are blinding Polyphemus. Detail of a Proto-Attic amphora, circa 650 BC. Eleusis, Archaeological Museum, Inv. 2630.

In an episode of Homer's Odyssey (c. 700 BC), the hero Odysseus encounters the Cyclops Polyphemus, the son of Poseidon, a one-eyed man-eating giant who lives with his fellow Cyclopes in a distant land. The relationship between these Cyclopes and Hesiod's Cyclopes is unclear. Homer described a very different group of Cyclopes, than the skilled and subservient craftsman of Hesiod. Homer's Cyclopes live in the "world of men" rather than among the gods, as they presumably do in the Theogony. The Homeric Cyclopes are presented as uncivilized shepherds, who live in caves, savages with no regard for Zeus. They have no knowledge of agriculture, ships or craft. They live apart and lack any laws.

The fifth-century BC playwright Euripides also told the story of Odysseus' encounter with Polyphemus in his satyr play Cyclops. Euripides' Cyclopes, like Homer's, are uncultured cave-dwelling shepherds. They have no agriculture, no wine, and live on milk, cheese and the meat of sheep. They live solitary lives, and have no government. They are inhospitable to strangers, slaughtering and eating all who come to their land. While Homer does not say if the other Cyclopes are like Polyphemus in their appearance and parentage, Euripides makes it explicit, calling the Cyclopes "Poseidon's one-eyed sons". And while Homer is vague as to their location, Euripides locates the land of the Cyclopes on the island of Sicily near Mount Etna.

Like Euripides, Virgil has the Cyclopes of Polyphemus live on Sicily near Etna. For Virgil apparently, these Homeric Cyclopes are members of the same race of Cyclopes as Hesiod's Brontes and Steropes, who live nearby.

=== Cyclopean wall-builders ===
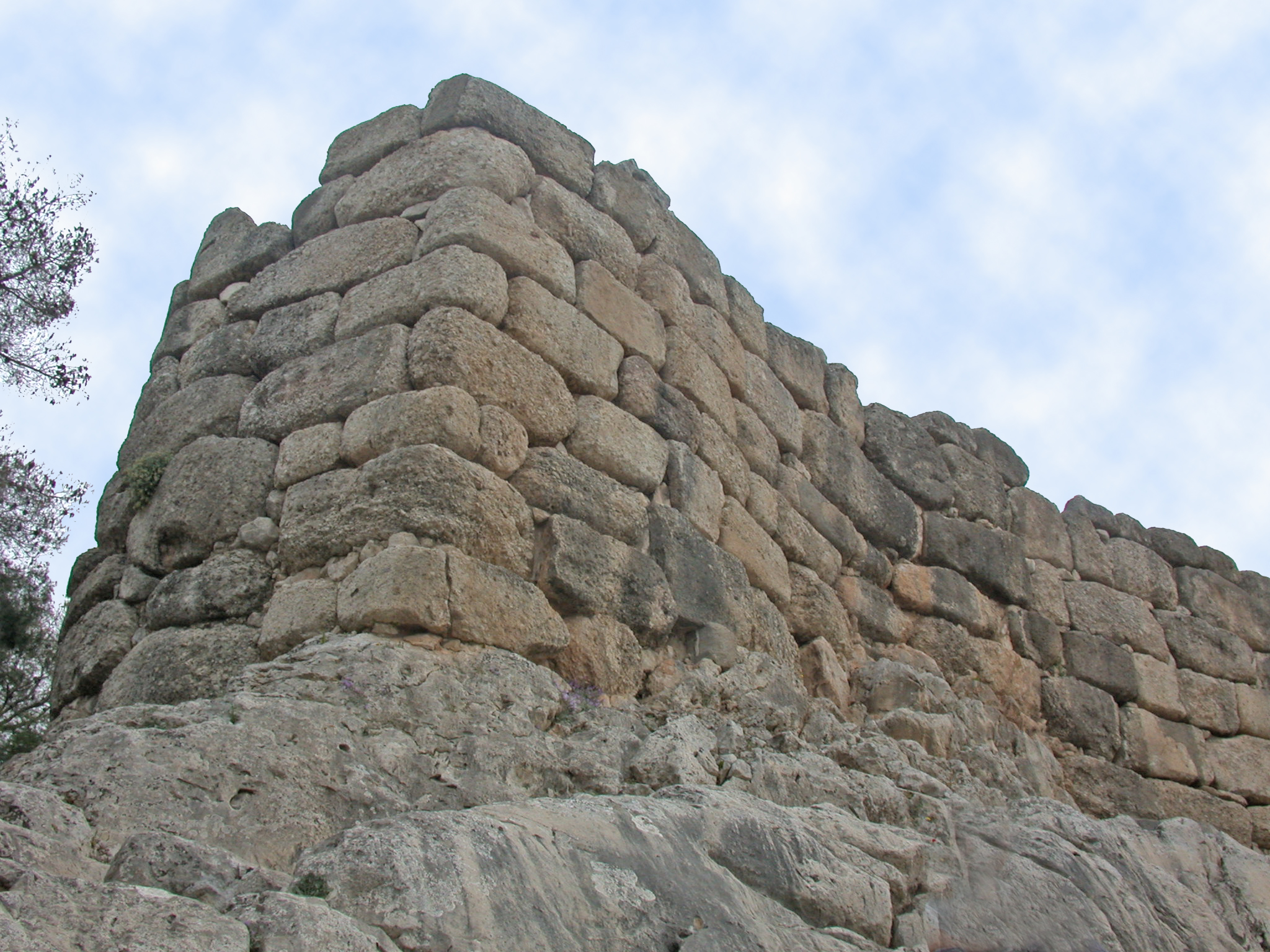
'Cyclopean' walls at Mycenae.

Cyclopes were also said to have been the builders of the so-called 'Cyclopean' walls of Mycenae, Tiryns, and Argos. Although they can be seen as being distinct, the Cyclopean wall-builders share several features with the Hesiodic Cyclopes: both groups are craftsmen of supernatural skill, possessing enormous strength, who lived in primordial times. These builder Cyclopes were apparently used to explain the construction of the stupendous walls at Mycenae and Tiryns, composed of massive stones that seemed too large and heavy to have been moved by ordinary men.

These master builders were famous in antiquity from at least the fifth century BC onwards. The poet Pindar has Heracles driving the cattle of Geryon through the "Cyclopean portal" of the Tirynian king Eurystheus. The mythographer Pherecydes says that Perseus brought the Cyclopes with him from Seriphos to Argos, presumably to build the walls of Mycenae. Proetus, the mythical king of ancient Argos, was said to have brought a group of seven Cyclopes from Lycia to build the walls of Tiryns.

The late fifth and early fourth-century BC comic poet Nicophon wrote a play called either Cheirogastores or Encheirogastores (Hands-to-Mouth), which is thought to have been about these Cyclopean wall-builders. Ancient lexicographers explained the title as meaning "those who feed themselves by manual labour", and, according to Eustathius of Thessalonica, the word was used to describe the Cyclopean wall-builders, while "hands-to-mouth" was one of the three kinds of Cyclopes distinguished by scholia to Aelius Aristides. Similarly, possibly deriving from Nicophon's comedy, the first-century Greek geographer Strabo says these Cyclopes were called "Bellyhands" (gasterocheiras) because they earned their food by working with their hands.

The first-century natural philosopher Pliny the Elder, in his Natural History, reported a tradition, attributed to Aristotle, that the Cyclopes were the inventors of masonry towers. In the same work Pliny also mentions the Cyclopes, as being among those credited with being the first to work with iron, as well as bronze. In addition to walls, other monuments were attributed to the Cyclopes. For example, Pausanias says that at Argos there was "a head of Medusa made of stone, which is said to be another of the works of the Cyclopes".

== Principal sources ==
=== Hesiod ===
According to the Theogony of Hesiod, Uranus (Sky) mated with Gaia (Earth) and produced eighteen children. First came the twelve Titans, next came the three one-eyed Cyclopes:

Then [Gaia] bore the Cyclopes, who have very violent hearts, Brontes (Thunder) and Steropes (Lightning) and strong-spirited Arges (Bright), those who gave thunder to Zeus and fashioned the thunderbolt. These were like the gods in other regards, but only one eye was set in the middle of their foreheads; and they were called Cyclopes (Circle-eyed) by name, since a single circle-shaped eye was set in their foreheads. Strength and force and contrivances were in their works.

Following the Cyclopes, Gaia next gave birth to three more monstrous brothers, the Hecatoncheires, or Hundred-Handed Giants. Uranus hated his monstrous children, and as soon as each was born, he imprisoned them underground, somewhere deep inside Gaia. Eventually Uranus' son, the Titan Cronus, castrated Uranus, becoming the new ruler of the cosmos, but he did not release his brothers, the Cyclopes and the Hecatoncheires, from their imprisonment in Tartarus.

For this failing, Gaia foretold that Cronus would eventually be overthrown by one of his children, as he had overthrown his own father. To prevent this, as each of his children were born, Cronus swallowed them whole; as gods they were not killed, but imprisoned within his belly. His wife, Rhea, sought her mother's advice to avoid losing all of her children in this way, and Gaia advised her to give Cronus a stone wrapped in swaddling clothes. In this way, Zeus was spared the fate of his elder siblings, and was hidden away by his mother. When he was grown, Zeus forced his father to vomit up his siblings, who rebelled against the Titans. Zeus released the Cyclopes and Hecatoncheires, who became his allies. While the Hundred-Handed Giants fought alongside Zeus and his siblings, the Cyclopes gave Zeus his great weapon, the thunderbolt, with the aid of which he was eventually able to overthrow the Titans, establishing himself as the ruler of the cosmos.

=== Homer ===
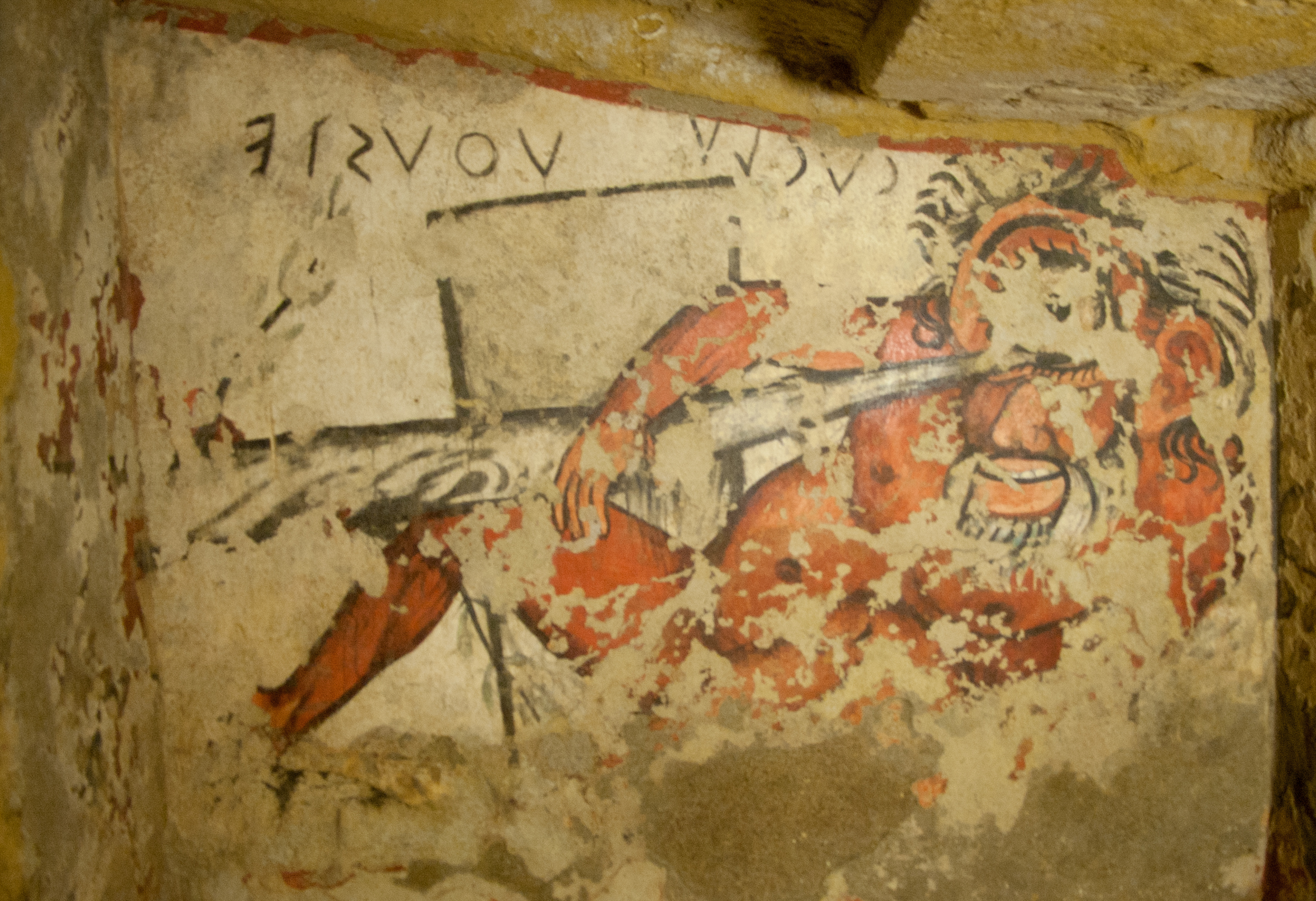
Fresco of Odysseus and the Cyclops in the Tomb of Orcus, Tarquinia, 4th century BC

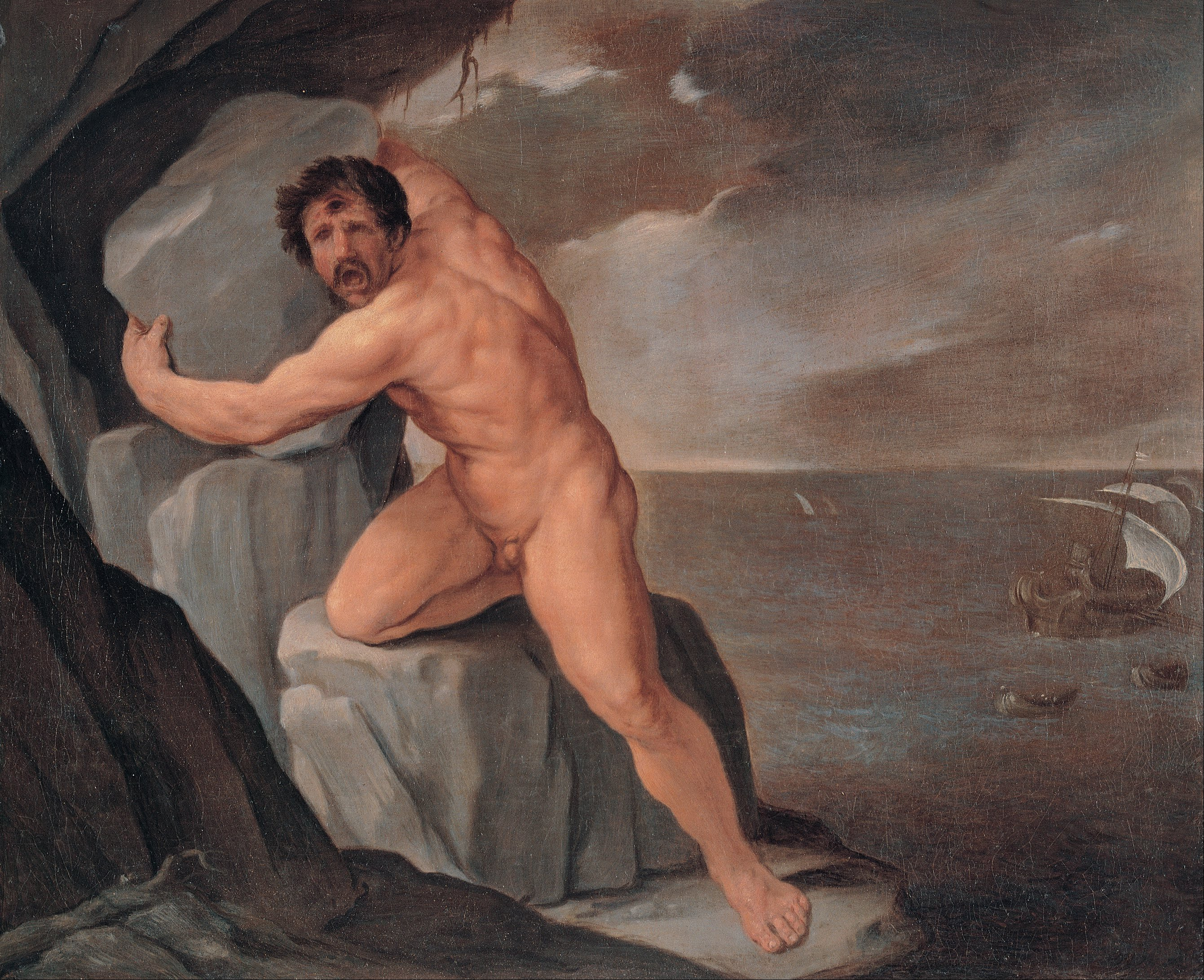
The blinded Polyphemus seeks vengeance on Odysseus: Guido Reni's painting in the Capitoline Museums.

In Book 9 of the Odyssey, Odysseus describes to his hosts the Phaeacians his encounter with the Cyclops Polyphemus. Having just left the land of the Lotus-eaters, Odysseus says "Thence we sailed on, grieved at heart, and we came to the land of the Cyclopes". Homer had already (Book 6) described the Cyclopes as "men overweening in pride who plundered [their neighbors the Phaeacians] continually", driving the Phaeacians from their home. In Book 9, Homer gives a more detailed description of the Cyclopes as:

an overweening and lawless folk, who, trusting in the immortal gods, plant nothing with their hands nor plough; but all these things spring up for them without sowing or ploughing, wheat, and barley, and vines, which bear the rich clusters of wine, and the rain of Zeus gives them increase. Neither assemblies for council have they, nor appointed laws, but they dwell on the peaks of lofty mountains in hollow caves, and each one is lawgiver to his children and his wives, and they reck nothing one of another.

According to Homer, the Cyclopes have no ships, nor ship-wrights, nor other craftsman, and know nothing of agriculture. They have no regard for Zeus or the other gods, for the Cyclopes hold themselves to be "better far than they".

Homer says that "godlike" Polyphemus, the son of Poseidon and the nymph Thoosa, the daughter of Phorcys, is the "greatest among all the Cyclopes". Homer describes Polyphemus as a shepherd who:

mingled not with others, but lived apart, with his heart set on lawlessness. For he was fashioned a wondrous monster, and was not like a man that lives by bread, but like a wooded peak of lofty mountains, which stands out to view alone, apart from the rest, ... [and as] a savage man that knew naught of justice or of law.

Although Homer does not say explicitly that Polyphemus is one-eyed, for the account of his blinding to make sense he must be. If Homer meant for the other Cyclopes to be assumed (as they usually are) to be like Polyphemus, then they too will be one-eyed sons of Poseidon; however Homer says nothing explicit about either the parentage or appearance of the other Cyclopes.

=== Euripides ===
The Hesiodic Cyclopes: makers of Zeus' thunderbolts, the Homeric Cyclopes: brothers of Polyphemus, and the Cyclopean wall-builders, all figure in the plays of the fifth-century BC playwright Euripides. In his play Alcestis, where we are told that the Cyclopes who forged Zeus' thunderbolts, were killed by Apollo. The prologue of that play has Apollo explain:

House of Admetus! In you I brought myself to taste the bread of menial servitude, god though I am. Zeus was the cause: he killed my son Asclepius, striking him in the chest with the lightning bolt, and in anger at this I slew the Cyclopes who forged Zeus’s fire. As my punishment for this Zeus compelled me to be a serf in the house of a mortal.

Euripides' satyr play Cyclops tells the story of Odysseus' encounter with the Cyclops Polyphemus, famously told in Homer's Odyssey. It takes place on the island of Sicily near the volcano Mount Etna where, according to the play, "Poseidon’s one-eyed sons, the man-slaying Cyclopes, dwell in their remote caves." Euripides describes the land where Polyphemus' brothers live, as having no "walls and city battlements", and a place where "no men dwell". The Cyclopes have no rulers and no government, "they are solitaries: no one is anyone’s subject." They grow no crops, living only "on milk and cheese and the flesh of sheep." They have no wine, "hence the land they dwell in knows no dancing". They show no respect for the important Greek value of Xenia ("guest friendship). When Odysseus asks if they are pious and hospitable toward strangers (φιλόξενοι δὲ χὤσιοι περὶ ξένους), he is told: "most delicious, they maintain, is the flesh of strangers ... everyone who has come here has been slaughtered."

Several of Euripides' plays also make reference to the Cyclopean wall-builders. Euripides calls their walls "heaven-high" (οὐράνια), describes "the Cyclopean foundations" of Mycenae as "fitted snug with red plumbline and mason’s hammer", and calls Mycenae "O hearth built by the Cyclopes". He calls Argos "the city built by the Cyclopes", refers to "the temples the Cyclopes built" and describes the "fortress of Perseus" as "the work of Cyclopean hands".

=== Callimachus ===
For the third-century BC poet Callimachus, the Hesiodic Cyclopes Brontes, Steropes and Arges, become assistants at the forge of the smith-god Hephaestus. Callimachus has the Cyclopes make Artemis' bow, arrows and quiver, just as they had (apparently) made those of Apollo. Callimachus locates the Cyclopes on the island of Lipari, the largest of the Aeolian Islands in the Tyrrhenian Sea off the northern coast of Sicily, where Artemis finds them "at the anvils of Hephaestus" making a horse-trough for Poseidon:

And the nymphs were affrighted when they saw the terrible monsters like unto the crags of Ossa: all had single eyes beneath their brows, like a shield of fourfold hide for size, glaring terribly from under; and when they heard the din of the anvil echoing loudly, and the great blast of the bellows and the heavy groaning of the Cyclopes themselves. For Aetna cried aloud, and Trinacia cried, the seat of the Sicanians, cried too their neighbour Italy, and Cyrnos therewithal uttered a mighty noise, when they lifted their hammers above their shoulders and smote with rhythmic swing the bronze glowing from the furnace or iron, labouring greatly. Wherefore the daughters of Oceanus could not untroubled look upon them face to face nor endure the din in their ears. No shame to them! on those not even the daughters of the Blessed look without shuddering, though long past childhood’s years. But when any of the maidens doth disobedience to her mother, the mother calls the Cyclopes to her child—Arges or Steropes; and from within the house comes Hermes, stained with burnt ashes. And straightway he plays bogey to the child and she runs into her mother’s lap, with her hands upon her eyes. But thou, Maiden, even earlier, while yet but three years old, when Leto came bearing thee in her arms at the bidding of Hephaestus that he might give thee handsel and Brontes set thee on his stout knees—thou didst pluck the shaggy hair of his great breast and tear it out by force. And even unto this day the mid part of his breast remains hairless, even as when mange settles on a man’s temples and eats away the hair.

And Artemis asks:

Cyclopes, for me too fashion ye a Cydonian bow and arrows and a hollow casket for my shafts; for I also am a child of Leto, even as Apollo. And if I with my bow shall slay some wild creature or monstrous beast, that shall the Cyclopes eat.

=== Virgil ===
The first-century BC Roman poet Virgil seems to combine the Cyclopes of Hesiod with those of Homer, having them live alongside each other in the same part of Sicily. In his Latin epic Aeneid, Virgil has the hero Aeneas follow in the footsteps of Odysseus, the hero of Homer's Odyssey. Approaching Sicily and Mount Etna, in Book 3 of the Aeneid, Aeneas manages to survive the dangerous Charybdis, and at sundown comes to the land of the Cyclopes, while "near at hand Aetna thunders". The Cyclopes are described as being "in shape and size like Polyphemus ... a hundred other monstrous Cyclopes [who] dwell all along these curved shores and roam the high mountains." After narrowly escaping from Polyphemus, Aeneas tells how, responding to the Cyclops' "mighty roar":

the race of the Cyclopes, roused from the woods and high mountains, rush to the harbour and throng the shores. We see them, standing impotent with glaring eye, the Aetnean brotherhood, their heads towering to the sky, a grim conclave: even as when on a mountaintop lofty oaks or cone-clad cypresses stand in mass, a high forest of Jove or grove of Diana.

Later, in Book 8 of the same poem, Virgil has the Hesiodic Cyclopes Brontes and Steropes, along with a third Cyclopes which he names Pyracmon, work in an extensive network of caverns stretching from Mount Etna to the Aeolian Islands. As the assistants of the smith-god Vulcan, they forge various items for the gods: thunderbolts for Jupiter, a chariot for Mars, and armor for Minerva:

In the vast cave the Cyclopes were forging iron—Brontes and Steropes and bare-limbed Pyracmon. They had a thunderbolt, which their hands had shaped, like the many that the Father hurls down from all over heaven upon earth, in part already polished, while part remained unfinished. Three shafts of twisted hail they had added to it, three of watery cloud, three of ruddy flame and the winged South Wind; now they were blending into the work terrifying flashes, noise, and fear, and wrath with pursuing flames. Elsewhere they were hurrying on for Mars a chariot and flying wheels, with which he stirs upmen and cities; and eagerly with golden scales of serpents were burnishing the awful aegis, armour of wrathful Pallas, the interwoven snakes, and on the breast of the goddess the Gorgon herself, with neck severed and eyes revolving.

=== Apollodorus ===
The mythographer Apollodorus, gives an account of the Hesiodic Cyclopes similar to that of Hesiod's, but with some differences, and additional details. According to Apollodorus, the Cyclopes were born after the Hundred-Handers, but before the Titans (unlike Hesiod who makes the Titans the eldest and the Hundred-Handers the youngest).

Uranus bound the Hundred-Handers and the Cyclopes, and cast them all into Tartarus, "a gloomy place in Hades as far distant from earth as earth is distant from the sky." But the Titans are, apparently, allowed to remain free (unlike in Hesiod). When the Titans overthrew Uranus, they freed the Hundred-Handers and Cyclopes (unlike in Hesiod, where they apparently remained imprisoned), and made Cronus their sovereign. But Cronus once again bound the six brothers, and reimprisoned them in Tartarus.

As in Hesiod's account, Rhea saved Zeus from being swallowed by Cronus, and Zeus was eventually able to free his siblings, and together they waged war against the Titans. According to Apollodorus, in the tenth year of that war, Zeus learned from Gaia, that he would be victorious if he had the Hundred-Handers and the Cyclopes as allies. So Zeus slew their warder Campe (a detail not found in Hesiod) and released them, and in addition to giving Zeus his thunderbolt (as in Hesiod), the Cyclopes also gave Poseidon his trident, and Hades a helmet (presumably the same cap of invisibility which Athena borrowed in the Iliad), and "with these weapons the gods overcame the Titans".

Apollodorus also mentions a tomb of Geraestus, "the Cyclops" at Athens upon which, in the time of king Aegeus, the Athenians sacrificed the daughters of Hyacinth.

=== Nonnus ===
The Dionysiaca, composed in the 4th or 5th century AD, is the longest surviving poem from antiquity – 20,426 lines. It is written by the poet Nonnus in the Homeric dialect, and its main subject is the life of Dionysus. It describes a war that occurred between Dionysus' troops and those of the Indian king Deriades. In book 28 of the Dionysiaca the Cyclopes join with Dionysian troops, and they prove to be great warriors and crush most of the Indian king's troops.

== Transformations of Polyphemus ==
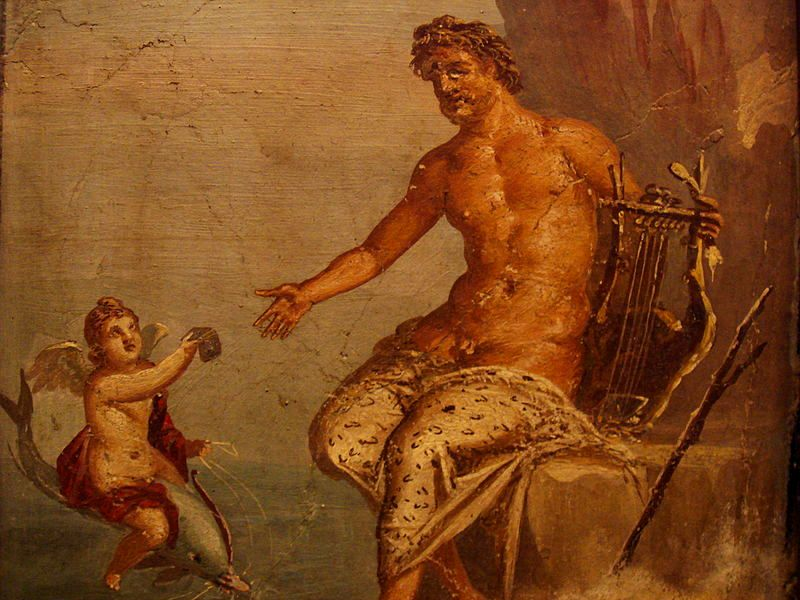
Polyphemus receives a love-letter from Galatea, a 1st-century AD fresco from Pompeii

Depictions of the Cyclops Polyphemus have differed radically, depending on the literary genres in which he has appeared, and have given him an individual existence independent of the Homeric herdsman encountered by Odysseus. In the Odyssey, he was a man-eating monster dwelling in an unspecified land. Some centuries later, a dithyramb by Philoxenus of Cythera, followed by several episodes by the Greek pastoral poets, created of him a comedic and generally unsuccessful lover of the water nymph Galatea. In the course of these he woos his love to the accompaniment of either a cithara or the pan-pipes. Such episodes take place on the island of Sicily, and it was here that the Latin poet Ovid also set the tragic love story of Polyphemus and Galatea recounted in the Metamorphoses. Still later tradition made him the eventually successful husband of Galatea and the ancestor of the Celtic and Illyrian races.

== Location ==
From at least the fifth-century BC onwards, Cyclopes have been associated with the island of Sicily, or the volcanic Aeolian islands just off Sicily's north coast. The fifth-century BC historian Thucydides says that the "earliest inhabitants" of Sicily were reputed to be the Cyclopes and Laestrygones (another group of man-eating giants encountered by Odysseus in Homer's Odyssey). Thucydides also reports the local belief that Hephaestus (along with his Cyclopean assistants?) had his forge on the Aeolian island of Vulcano.

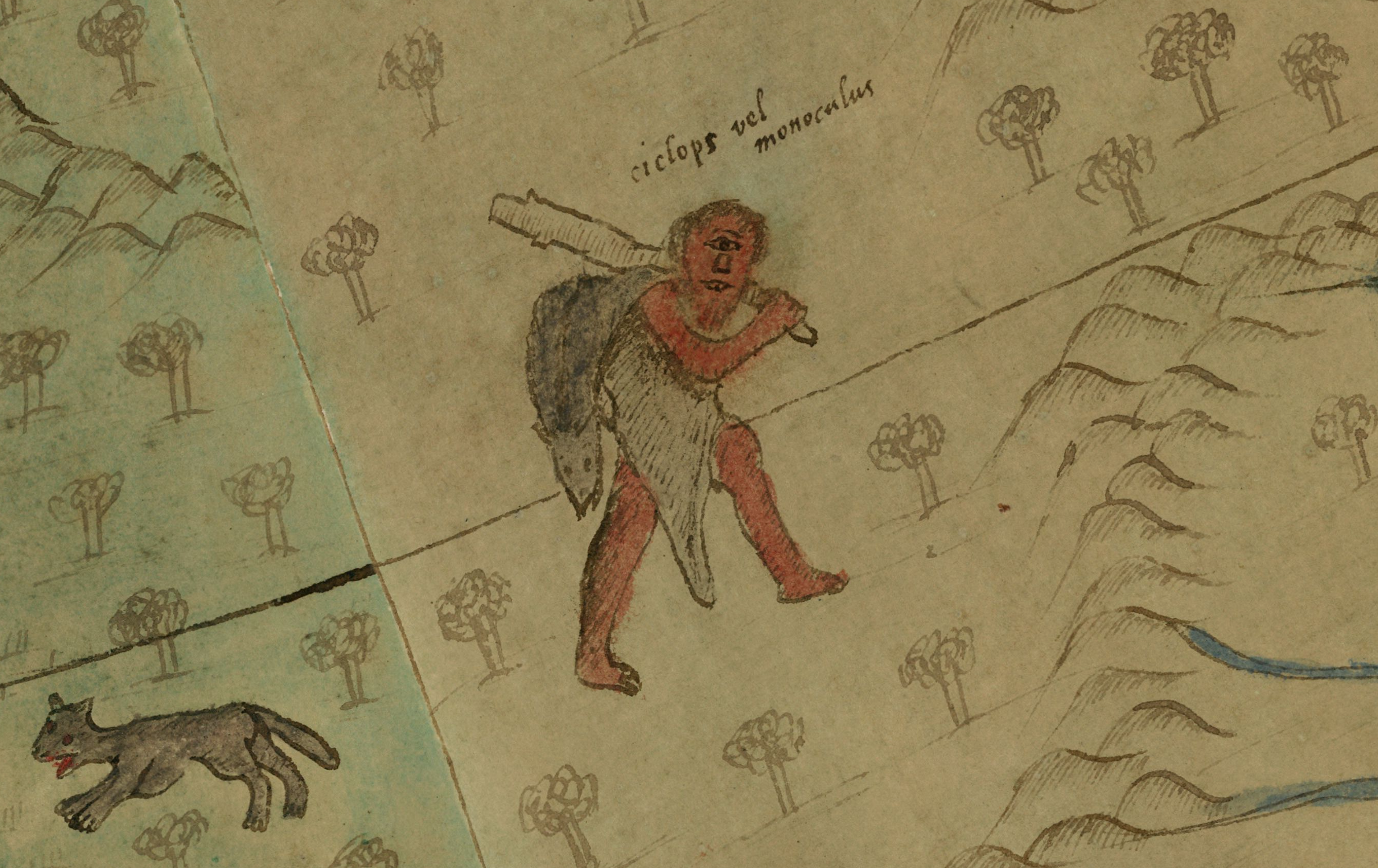
A "ciclops" from Urbano Monti's 1587 world map.

Euripides locates Odysseus' Cyclopes on the island of Sicily, near the volcano Mount Etna, and in the same play addresses Hephaestus as "lord of Aetna". The poet Callimachus locates the Cyclopes' forge on the island of Lipari, the largest of the Aeolians. Virgil associates both the Hesiodic and the Homeric Cyclopes with Sicily. He has the thunderbolt makers: "Brontes and Steropes and bare-limbed Pyracmon", work in vast caverns extending underground from Mount Etna to the island of Vulcano, while the Cyclops brethren of Polyphemus live on Sicily where "near at hand Aetna thunders".

As Thucydides notes, in the case of Hephaestus' forge on Vulcano, locating the Cyclopes' forge underneath active volcanoes provided an explanation for the fire and smoke often seen rising from them.

In 1587, Italian cartographer Urbano Monti depicted a "ciclops" on a portion of his world map identified as New Guinea.

== Etymology ==
For the ancient Greeks, the name "Cyclopes" meant "Circle-eyes" or "Round-eyes", derived from the Greek kúklos ("circle") and ops ("eye"). This meaning can be seen as early as Hesiod's Theogony (8th–7th century BC), which explains that the Cyclopes were called that "since a single circle-shaped eye was set in their foreheads". Adalbert Kuhn, expanding on Hesiod's etymology, proposed a connection between the first element kúklos (which can also mean "wheel") and the "wheel of the sun", producing the meaning "wheel (of the sun)-eyes". Other etymologies have been proposed which derive the second element of the name from the Greek klops ("thief") producing the meanings "wheel-thief" or, deriving the first element from Proto-Indo-European *péḱu, "cattle-thief". Although Walter Burkert has described Hesiod's etymology as "not too attractive", Hesiod's explanation still finds acceptance by modern scholars.

== Possible origins ==
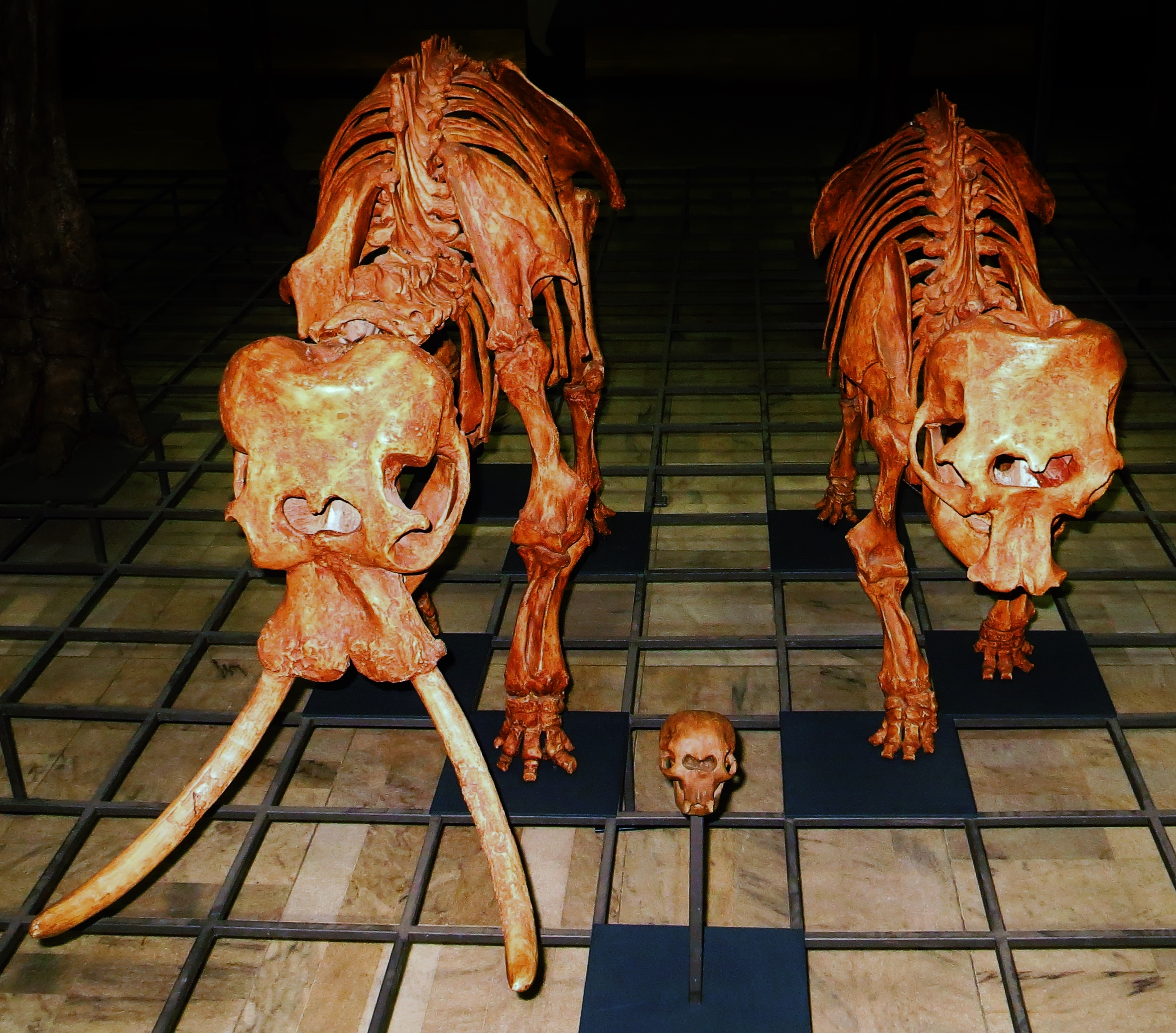
Palaeoloxodon falconeri skeletons, showing the large nasal orifice alleged by some authors to be the inspiration for the cyclopes

Various origin hypotheses for the Cyclopes, including its distinctive one-eyed appearance, have been offered.

A possible origin for one-eyed Cyclopes was advanced by the palaeontologist Othenio Abel in 1914, 1925 and 1939. Abel proposed that fossil skulls of Pleistocene dwarf elephants, specifically the Sicilian dwarf elephant Palaeoloxodon falconeri, inspired the cyclopes myth. Abel suggested that the large, central nasal cavity (for the trunk) in the skull might have been interpreted as a large single eye-socket. However, this claim has been criticised by Greek mythology scholars Mercedes Aguirre and Richard Buxton as lacking evidence and being unfalsifiable. Othenio Abel's hypothesis was widely popularized because he claimed that Greek philosopher Empedocles identified elephant bones as cyclopes remains. However, this claim has "no basis in any surviving records". Paleontologist Mark Witton and Richard Hing were similarly critical of the dwarf elephant hypothesis, stating that "without his literary evidence [of the Empedocles story], Abel's geomyth becomes baseless: elephant fossils and myths of one-eyed monsters exist all over the world, and there is no evidence from historic texts or artwork that makes their connection in Sicily particularly notable or important". Other similarly unverifiable and unfalsifiable explanations include that the eye originated from the appearance of volcanism related features, such as craters, or bubbles in volcanic water and mud. Mercedes Aguirre and Richard Buxton write that while these scientific explanations for the Cyclopes might have "an air of plausibility" they lack a "robust chain of argument, a demonstrable sequence of circumstances, that might link the supposed origin with the myth" or a good reason to favour one explanation over another.

Cyclopia, a rare birth defect, can result in foetuses which have a single eye. Although the possibility has been raised of a link between this deformity and the myth of the one-eyed Cyclopes, in such cases, the eye is below the nose—rather than above as in ancient Greek depictions.

As noted above, Walter Burkert sees the possibility of the Hesiodic Cyclopes having ancient smith guilds as their basis.

== See also ==
- List of one-eyed creatures in mythology and fiction
- Polyphemus § Possible origins, for stories of other cyclopian giants similar to the story of Polyphemus's encounter with Odysseus
