= Melchiorre Gioia =

Italian writer

Melchiorre Gioja
- Born: 10 September 1767; Piacenza, Italy
- Died: 2 January 1829 (aged 61); Milan, Italy
- Occupations: Writer on philosophy and political economy
- Notable work: Del merito e delle ricompense, Nuovo Prospetto delle scienze economiche, Filosofia della statistica

Signature
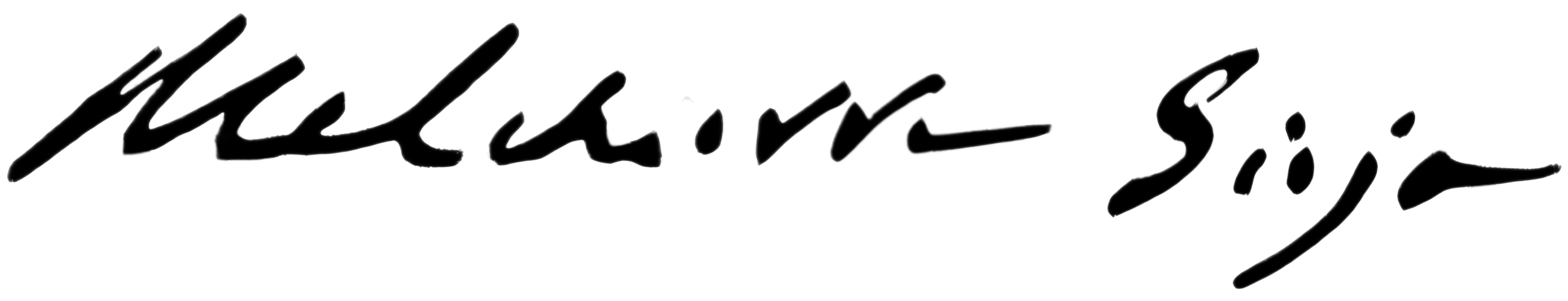

Melchiorre Gioja (10 September 1767 – 2 January 1829) was an Italian writer on philosophy and political economy. His name is spelled Gioia in modern Italian.

== Biography ==
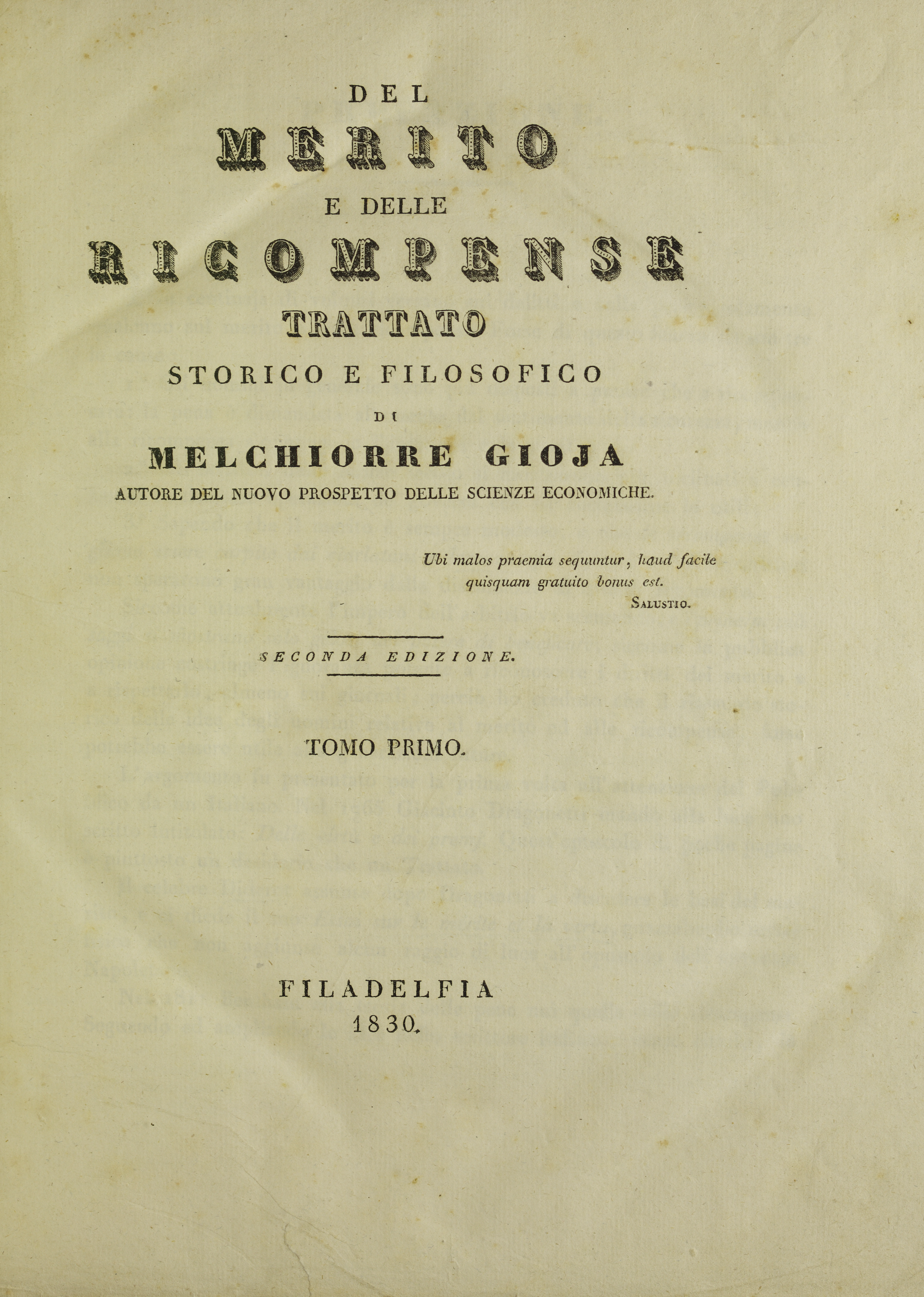
Del merito e delle ricompense

Gioia was born at Piacenza, in what is now northern Italy. Originally intended for the church, he took orders, but renounced them in 1796 and went to Milan, where he devoted himself to the study of political economy. Having obtained the prize for an essay on "the kind of free government best adapted to Italy" he decided upon the career of a publicist.

The arrival of Napoleon in Italy drew him into public life. He advocated a republic under the dominion of the French in a pamphlet I Tedeschi, i Francesi, ed i Russi in Lombardia, and under the Cisalpine Republic he was named historiographer and director of statistics. He was imprisoned several times, once for eight months in 1820 on a charge of being implicated in a conspiracy with the Carbonari. After the fall of Napoleon he retired into private life, and does not appear to have held office again.

Gioja's fundamental idea is the value of statistics or the collection of facts. Philosophy itself is with him classification and consideration of ideas. Logic he regarded as a practical art, and his Esercizio logico has the further title, Art of deriving benefit from ill-constructed books. In ethics Gioja follows Bentham generally, and his large treatise Del merito e delle recompense (1818) is a clear and systematic view of social ethics from the utilitarian principle.

In political economy this avidity for facts produced better fruits. The Nuovo Prospetto delle scienze economiche (1815-1817), although long to excess, and overburdened with classifications and tables, contains much valuable material. The author prefers large properties and large commercial undertakings to small ones, and strongly favours association as a means of production. He defends a restrictive policy and insists on the necessity of the action of the state as a regulating power in the industrial world. He was an opponent of ecclesiastical domination. He must be credited with the finest and most original treatment of division of labour since the Wealth of Nations.

Much of what Babbage taught later on the subject of combined work is anticipated by Gioja. His theory of production is also deserving of attention from the fact that it takes into account and gives due prominence to immaterial goods. Throughout the work there is continuous opposition to Adam Smith. Gioja's latest work Filosofia della statistica (2 vols, 1826; 4 vols, 1829-1830) contains in brief compass the essence of his ideas on human life, and affords the clearest insight into his aim and method in philosophy both theoretical and practical.

Gioia was one of the founders of the Annali Universali di Statistica, published in Milan between 1824 and 1871. Issued in monthly installments, which were then collected into quarterly volumes, the Annali featured contributions from prominent Italian economists and intellectuals, including Pietro Custodi and Gian Domenico Romagnosi. Gioia died in Milan on 2 January 1829.
