= Abbondio Collina =

Italian monk, priest, mathematician, and geographer

- Born: 1691; Bologna
- Died: 12 December 1757 (aged 65–66); Bologna
- Known for: Monograph on the discovery of the compass
- Scientific career
- Fields: mathematics and geography
- Workplaces: University of Pisa

Abbondio Collina (sometimes written Abondio), O.S.B. Cam. (1691 – 21 December 1757) was an Italian Camaldolese monk, priest, mathematician, and geographer.

== Life ==
Abbondio Collina was born (al secolo) Giovanni in Bologna to Pietro Collina and Giacoma Santi. In Ravenna at the monastery of Classe he became a Camaldolese monk in 1709. He was sent in 1717 to the University of Pisa to study under Luigi Guido Grandi. He then moved to Bologna to occupy the cathedra of geography and Nautics at the Istituto delle Scienze. He was also named lecturer of geometry, endowed by his brother Marco Antonio Collina Sbaraglia. A third brother, Bonifacio (al secolo Giuseppe) Collina was similarly educated like Abbondio, and endowed to teach philosophy in Bologna. He was a founding member of the Accademia Benedettina of Bologna. In 1742, he was named as Governor of the Monastery of Santi Cosma e Damiano del Monaftero de' Santi Cofma, e Damiano di Bologna.

Among these lectures was a set of around the topic of the Invention of the Compass, published in the Acts of the Academy of Sciences of the Institute of Bologna.

Later these were collected in a monograph titled Considerazioni Istoriche sopra l'origine della Bussola nautica nell'Asia, published in quarto by the Padre Abate Trombelli in Faenza in 1748.

Collina also translated some recollections of travels by two Arabs published by ab. Renaudot. This translation was published in quarto in Bologna 1749. His poetry was included in collections. He died in December 1753 and left manuscript titled: Geografia Storica, a Istituzioni Nautiche and the Annali d'Italia del Muratori compilati e corretti.
