= Pietro Custodi =

Italian economist

The Right Honourable Pietro Custodi
- Bust of Pietro Custodi by Gaetano Matteo Monti
- Born: November 29, 1771; Galliate, Kingdom of Sardinia
- Died: 15 May 1842 (aged 70); Galbiate, Kingdom of Lombardy–Venetia
- Occupations: Economist; Journalist; Politician
- Known for: editing a collection of the principal Italian economists
- Title: Baron
- Spouses: Febronia Colombo (m. 1805; died 1829) Nina Arioli (m. 1829)
- Parent(s): Giuseppe Custodi; Geltrude Milanesi
- Awards: Order of the Iron Crown

Academic background
- Education: University of Pavia

Academic work
- Discipline: Political economy, political philosophy
- School or tradition: Classical economics

Pietro Custodi (29 November 1771 – 15 May 1842) was an Italian economist and journalist.

== Biography ==
Born in Galliate, near Novara, Custodi was by profession a lawyer, but soon entered into journalism and directed the newspaper L'Amico della libertà italiana. He was arrested by Napoleon but freed after the establishment of the Kingdom of Italy and appointed secretary-general of the finance department in Milan. Later he was made a baron and became a state councilor. He died in Galbiate, near Milan, in 1842.

Custodi continued Pietro Verri's History of Milan and edited the unpublished works of Baretti; as an economist he is widely known as the editor of a collection of the principal Italian economists in fifty volumes.

== Works ==
His greatest contribution to economics was the compilation of 50 volumes of Italian essays and articles on political economy, Scrittori classici italiani di economia politica (1803–16). Many of these papers, written from the earliest times to the beginning of the 19th century, had not been published before. In 1824 Custodi founded, together with Gioia and Romagnosi, the Annali Universali di Statistica, one of the first Italian economic reviews.

== Bibliography ==
- Pantaleoni, Maffeo (1894). "Custodi, Pietro". In Inglis Palgrave (ed.). Dictionary of Political Economy. Vol. 1. London: Macmillan and Company. p. 474.
- Gallavresi, Giuseppe (1931). "CUSTODI, Pietro, barone". Enciclopedia Italiana. Rome: Istituto dell'Enciclopedia Italiana.
- Antonielli, Livio (1985). "CUSTODI, Pietro". Dizionario Biografico degli Italiani (in Italian). Vol. 31: Cristaldi–Dalla Nave. Rome: Institute of the Italian Encyclopaedia. ISBN 978-88-12-00032-6.
