= Clelia Grillo Borromeo =

Italian mathematician and scientist

Clelia Grillo Borromeo Arese
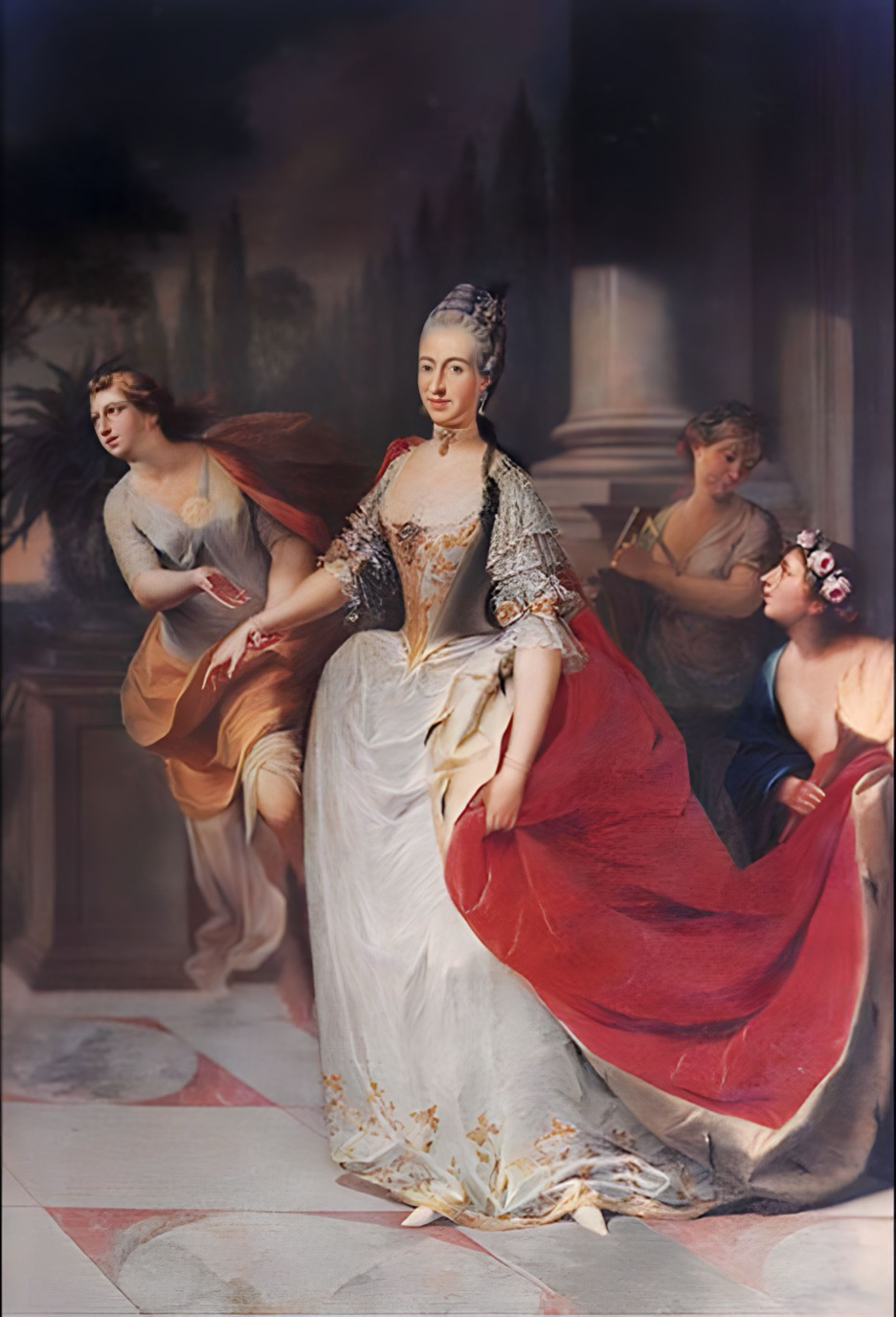
- Born: 1684; Genoa, Republic of Genoa
- Died: 23 August 1777 (aged 92–93); Milan, Duchy of Milan
- Resting place: Santa Maria Podone
- Occupations: Natural philosopher; Mathematician; Scientist
- Known for: Discovering the clélie curve
- Spouse: Giovanni Benedetto Borromeo Arese (1707–1744)
- Children: 8
- Parent(s): Marcantonio Grillo and Maria Antonia Grillo (née Imperiali)

Clelia Grillo Borromeo Arese (1684 – 23 August 1777) was an Italian (Genoese) natural philosopher, mathematician and scientist.

== Life and education ==
Clelia Borromeo was a member of one of the most important patrician families of Northern Italy. She was born in Genoa, the daughter of Marcantonio Grillo, duke of Mondragone, and Maria Antonia Imperiali.

Borromeo was educated in several languages, mathematics, natural science and mechanics. She spoke eight languages and was interested in geometry, natural science and mathematics. She was educated first by her mother and then in a convent, but it is unknown where she received education in the subjects she became known for.

In 1707, she married count Giovanni Benedetto Borromeo Arese (1707–1744), and became the mother of eight children.

Borromeo died in Milan on 23 August 1777. She was buried in the collegiate church of Santa Maria Podone.

== Contributions ==
Borromeo was famous for her ability to solve every mathematical problem presented to her. Borromeo was described as an independent person, which was regarded as eccentric because it was not considered natural for her gender. She opened her salon to the best scientific minds of the time during those years. The most frequent visitor to the salon of the Countess was Antonio Vallisneri, physician, naturalist and Professor of medicine at the University of Padua.

In 1719 she founded the Clelian Academy (Academia Clœlia Vigilantium), whose members gathered in her palace in Milan. The Academy was modeled on the Accademia del Cimento, the Royal Society and the French Academy of Sciences. Prominent members included the Abbot Luigi Guido Grandi, Jesuits and distinguished mathematicians Tommaso Ceva and Giovanni Girolamo Saccheri, the physicists Giovanni Francesco Crivelli (fellow of the Royal Society, proponent of the equal importance of theoretical physics with experimental physics) and Alessandro Volta and the scholars Francesco Saverio Quadrio and Giuseppe Antonio Sassi. Vallisneri himself drew up the statutes of the Academy.

The Clelian Academy played a major role in the scientific cultural debate at the time. It played a significant role in the dissemination of Newtonian physics and Leibnizian philosophy in Italy.

During the war in 1746, Borromeo took the side of Spain against Austria and was therefore exiled. When she was allowed to return to Milan, she was celebrated as a heroine.

== Clelia curves ==
In 1728, Luigi Guido Grandi described the so-called Clelia curves in his book Flores geometrici ex rhodonearum et cloeliarum, which he dedicated to Borromeo. These are curves on the sphere for whose points there is a linear relationship between longitude and colatitude. That is, their spherical coordinates satisfy $\varphi = m\theta$ for some constant $m$.

== Recognition ==
The city of Genoa honored her with a medal with the inscription Genuensium Gloria (The Honor of Genoa).

== Bibliography ==
- Dröscher, Ariane. "Grillo Borromeo Arese Clelia". Scienza a due voci.
- Fagioli Vercellone, Guido G. (2000). "Grillo, Clelia (del)". Dizionario Biografico degli Italiani (in Italian). Vol. 55: Ginammi–Giovanni da Crema. Rome: Istituto dell'Enciclopedia Italiana. pp. 450–454. ISBN 978-88-12-00032-6.
- Findlen, Paula (2009). "Founding a Scientific Academy: Gender, Patronage and Knowledge in Early Eighteenth-Century Milan". Republics of Letters. 1 (1): 1–43.
- Generali, Dario, ed. (2011). Clelia Grillo Borromeo Arese: un salotto letterario settecentesco tra arte, scienza e politica. Florence: Leo S. Olschki. ISBN 9788822260512.
