= Clelia (given name) =

- Gender: Female

Origin
- Origin: Italian

Other names
- Related names: Cloelia, Clélia, Clélie, Klelia

Clelia is a feminine given name derived from the Latin Cloelia, associated with the root of the verb cluere "to have renown, fame," and the name therefore means "illustrious, famous." In Roman legend Cloelia was a maiden who was given to an Etruscan invader as a hostage, but managed to escape by swimming across the Tiber.

== People named Clelia ==
- Clelia Barbieri (1847–1870), Italian Catholic saint
- Clelia Grillo Borromeo (1684–1777), Italian mathematician, scientist, and countess
- Clelia Farnese (c. 1556 – 1613), daughter of Cardinal Alessandro Farnese (1520–1589)
- Clelia Durazzo Grimaldi (1760–1830), Italian botanist and marchesa
- Clelia Haji-Ioannou (born 1970/1971), Cypriot billionaire
- Clelia Matania (1918–1981), Italian actress
- Clelia Duel Mosher (1863–1940), American hygienist and women's health advocate
- Clelia Maria Josepha (Giuseppina) Strepponi (1815–1897), Italian operatic soprano, wife of Giuseppe Verdi
- Clelia Tini (born 1992), Sammarinese swimmer
- Lilian Mercedes Letona, known as Commander Clelia (1954–1983), Salvadoran guerrilla and revolutionary
- Clelia Lollini (1890–1963), Italian medical doctor
- Clelia Murphy (born 1975), Irish actress

== Fictional characters ==
- Clélia Conti, a character in the novel The Charterhouse of Parma by Stendhal
- Clélia, a character played by Sophie Marceau in the film La Fidélité
- Metastasio's libretto for "Il trionfo di Clelia" - opera set by Hasse, Gluck, and other composers
- Clelia Waldgrave, a character in "The Nerd," a two-act comedy written by American actor/playwright Larry Shue
