= Monti (given name) =

Monti is a given name. Notable people with the name include:

- Monti Amundson, American guitar player
- Monti Martin (1921–2000), American soldier who joined the German army and became an SS soldier
- Monti Belot (born 1943), Senior United States District Judge
- Monti Carlo (born 1975), Puerto Rican chef
- Monti Davis (1958–2013), American basketball player
- Monti Mohsen (born 2000), Canadian soccer player
- Monti Ossenfort (born 1976), American football executive
- Monti Sharp (born 1967), American actor

== See also ==
- Monte (name), given name and surname
- Monti (surname)
- Montie, given name and surname
- Monty, given name and surname
