= Monty =

Monty is a masculine given name, often a short form of Montgomery, Montague and other similar names. It is also a surname.

Notable people with the name or nickname include:

== Nickname ==
- Bernard Montgomery (1887–1976), British Second World War field marshal
- Bruce Montgomery (musical director) (1927–2008), American music composer and former director of the Penn Glee Club
- Chris Montgomery (born 1972), American computer specialist and founder of the Xiph.Org Foundation
- Colin Montgomerie (born 1963), Scottish golfer
- Michael Widenius (born 1962), Finnish computer programmer, the main author of the open-source MySQL database and a founding member of the MySQL AB company
- Montagu Corry, 1st Baron Rowton (1838–1903), British philanthropist and public servant, longtime private secretary to Benjamin Disraeli
- Montgomery Clift (1920–1966), American actor
- Monty (rapper), American rapper known for featuring on Fetty Wap's 679 and My Way
- Monty Basgall (1922–2005), American Major League Baseball player and coach
- Monty Berman (1905–2006), British cinematographer and film and television producer
- Monty Bowden (1865–1892), English cricketer and wicket-keeper
- Monty Burton (1918–1999), British pilot
- Monty Don (born 1955), British horticulturist and television presenter
- Monty Dumond (born 1982), South African rugby union player
- Monty Kaser (1941–2009), American golfer
- Monty Mason (born 1967), American politician
- Monty Montgomery (American football) (born 1973), former American football cornerback
- Monty Newborn (born 1938), American professor of electrical engineering and computer science
- Monty Panesar (born 1982), England cricketer Mudhsuden Singh Panesar
- Monty Roberts (born 1935), American horse trainer
- Monty Williams (born 1971), American National Basketball Association associate head coach and former player
- Richard Montgomerie (1999–2007), Sussex cricketer

== Given name ==
- Monty Alexander (born 1944), Jamaican jazz pianist
- Monty Banks (1897–1950), Italian comedian and film producer born Mario Bianchi
- Monty Beisel (born 1978), American National Football League player
- Monty Betham (born 1978), New Zealand boxer and former rugby league footballer and junior world karate champion
- Monty Brown (born 1970), American professional wrestler and National Football League player
- Monte Collins (1898–1951), American film actor and screenwriter also credited as Monty Collins
- Monty Fariss (born 1967), American baseball player
- Monty Grow (born 1971), American football player
- Monty Hall (born Monte Halparin, 1921–2017), Canadian-American television game show host
- Monty Halls (born 1966), English TV broadcaster, explorer and marine biologist
- Monty Lewis (born 1963), American collegiate head football coach
- Monty Lewis (artist) (1907–1997), Welsh-born American artist
- Monty Montgomery (baseball) (born 1946), American Major League Baseball pitcher
- Monty Montgomery (producer) (born 1963), American film producer, director, actor and screenwriter
- Monty Norman (1928–2022), British singer and film composer
- Monty Oum (1981–2015), American animator, director, and screenwriter
- Monty Powell (born 1961), American country music songwriter
- Monty Rice (born 1999), American football player
- Monty Sopp (born 1963), American pro wrestler, more commonly known as Billy Gunn

== Surname ==
- Gloria Monty (1921–2006), American soap opera producer
- Ole Monty (1908–1977), Danish film actor
- Pete Monty (born 1974), American National Football League player
- Rodolphe Monty (1874–1928), Canadian politician

== Fictional characters ==
- A character on Sesame Street
- Montgomery Montgomery, in the A Series of Unfortunate Events books, movie and series
- A nickname for Montana Max, a Tiny Toon Adventures character
- Monty, the cat in the Stuart Little films
- Uncle Monty, in the film Withnail and I
- Nickname of C. Montgomery Burns, evil billionaire on The Simpsons
- Old Monty, in the 2003 remake of The Texas Chain Saw Massacre
- Monty de la Cruz, a character in the Netflix series 13 Reasons Why
- Monty Mole, the player character in a 1980s series of video games by the English company Gremlin Graphics
- Monty, a large red dump truck in Thomas and Friends, who debuted in the short-lived spin-off series, Jack and the Sodor Construction Company
- Nickname of Monterey Jack, a character in the Chip 'n Dale Rescue Rangers animated television series
- Dr. Monty, in the video game Call of Duty: Black Ops III
- Monty Green, a main character in the TV show The 100
- Monty, a vulture-like bird in the 2017 film Smurfs: The Lost Village
- Monty Montahue, main character of the American comic strip Monty
- Monty Richardson, title character of the short-lived Fox sitcom Monty, played by Henry Winkler
- Monty Kirkham, in the film Big Fat Liar, played by Amanda Detmer
- Birth name of Lightning McQueen, a racer in Pixar's Cars
- Henry “Monty” Montague, a character from the novel The Gentleman's Guide to Vice and Virtue by Mackenzi Lee
- Montgomery Gator (Monty) from the video game Five Nights at Freddy's: Security Breach
- Monty, main character on the Zee Horror Show

== See also ==
- Monte (name), a given name and surname
- Monti (given name)
- Monti (surname)
- Montie, a given name and surname
