= Clélie =

Clelia curve for c=1/4 with an orientation (arrows) (At the coordinate axes the curve runs upwards, see the corresponding floorplan below, too)

Clelia curves: floor plans of examples, arcs on the lower half of the sphere are dotted. The last four curves (spherical spirals) start at the south pole and end at the northpole. The upper four curves are due to the choice of parameter $c$ periodic (see: rose).

In mathematics, a Clélie or Clelia curve is a curve on a sphere with the property:

If the surface of a sphere is described as usual by the longitude (angle $\varphi$) and the colatitude (angle $\theta$) then

$$\varphi=c\;\theta, \quad c>0$$.

The curve was named by Luigi Guido Grandi after Clelia Borromeo.

Viviani's curve and spherical spirals are special cases of Clelia curves. In practice Clelia curves occur as the ground track of satellites in polar circular orbits, i.e., whose traces on the earth include the poles. If the orbit is a geosynchronous one, then $c=1$ and the trace is a Viviani's curve.

== Parametric representation ==
If the sphere of radius $r$ is parametrized in the spherical coordinate system by

$$\begin{align}
x &= r \cdot \cos \theta \cdot \cos \varphi \\
y &= r \cdot \cos \theta \cdot \sin \varphi \\
z &= r \cdot \sin \theta
\end{align}$$

where $\theta$ and $\varphi$ are angles, the longitude and latitude (respectively) of a point on the sphere and these two angles are connected by a linear equation $\; \varphi=c\theta$, then using this equation to replace $\varphi$ gives a parametric representation of a Clelia curve:

$$\begin{align}
x &= r \cdot \cos \theta \cdot \cos c\theta \\
y &= r \cdot \cos \theta \cdot \sin c\theta \\
z &= r \cdot \sin \theta.
\end{align}$$

== Examples ==
Any Clelia curve meets the poles at least once.

Spherical spirals: $\quad c \ge 2 \ , \quad -\pi/2\le \theta\le \pi/2$

A spherical spiral usually starts at the south pole and ends at the north pole (or vice versa).

Viviani's curve: $\quad c=1\ , \quad 0 \le \theta\le 2\pi$

Trace of a polar orbit of a satellite: $\quad c\le 1\ ,\quad \theta\ge 0$

In case of $\;c\le 1\;$ the curve is periodic, if $c$ is rational (see rose). For example: In case of $\; c=1/n\;$ the period is $\;n\cdot 2\pi\;$. If $c$ is a non rational number, the curve is not periodic.

The table (second diagram) shows the floor plans of Clelia curves. The lower four curves are spherical spirals. The upper four are polar orbits. In case of $\;c=1/3\;$ the lower arcs are hidden exactly by the upper arcs. The picture in the middle (circle) shows the floor plan of a Viviani's curve. The typical 8-shaped appearance can only be achieved by the projection along the x-axis.
