= Montes (surname) =

Montes is a toponymic surname. In Spanish and Portuguese, the word means places related to "hills" and "mountains" and there are several locations with this name.

The surname may refer to:

- Ana Montes (born 1957), Cuban spy
- Andrés Montes (1955–2009), Spanish sports commentator
- C. J. Montes (born 2002), American football player
- Carlos Montes (21st century), American activist
- César Montes (born 1997), Mexican football player
- Conchita Montes (1914–1994), Spanish film actress
- David Ginesta Montes (born 1987), Spanish handball coach and for player
- Elias Bladimir Montes (born 1973), Salvadoran football (soccer) player
- Eugenio Montes (1900-1982), Spanish politician and writer
- Francisco Montes Reina (1804–1851), Spanish bullfighter
- Gala Montes (born 2000), Mexican actress and singer
- Gustavo Vázquez Montes (1962–2005), Mexican politician
- Ingrid del Carmen Montes González (born 1985), Chemistry Professor and Director-at-large at ACS
- Ismael Montes (1861–1933), Bolivian general and political figure
- Jorge García Montes (1896–1982), Cuban lawyer and politician
- José Francisco Montes (19th century), President of Honduras
- Juan Alberto Montes (1902–1986), Argentinian historian
- Julia Montes (born 1995), Filipina actress and model
- Julio Montes Taracena (1915–1997), Guatemalan farmer and scouting leader
- Lina Montes (1923–1984), Cuban actress
- Lola Montes (dancer) (1918–2008), Spanish dancer
- Lola Montes (singer) (1898–1983), Spanish singer
- Luis Montes (born 1986), Mexican footballer
- Miguel Montes (born 1980), Salvadoran footballer
- Pablo Montes (athlete) (1945–2008), former Cuban sprinter
- Ricardo Ernesto Montes i Bradley (1905–1976), Argentine non-fiction writer
- Segundo Montes (1933–1989), scholar, philosopher, educator, sociologist and Jesuit priest
- Verónica Montes (born 1990), Peruvian actress
- Virginia "Ginny" Montes (1943–1994), civil rights activist and feminist
- Yolanda "Tongolele" Montes (1932–2025), exotic dancer and actress

== See also ==
- Montes-Bradley
