= Montecorvino =

Montecorvino may refer to:

== Localities ==
- Montecorvino Pugliano, Italian municipality of the province of Salerno
- Montecorvino Rovella, Italian municipality of the province of Salerno
- Motta Montecorvino, Italian municipality of the province of Foggia
- Pietramontecorvino, Italian municipality of the province of Foggia

== Personalities ==
- John of Montecorvino, Italian franciscan missionary

== Religion ==
- Montecorvino (titular see), Italian Roman Catholic titular see
- Roman Catholic Diocese of Montecorvino, suppressed Italian Roman Catholic diocese
