= Montes, West Virginia =

Montes
- Unincorporated community
- Location within the state of West Virginia Montes (the United States)
- Coordinates: 38°50′46″N 79°43′42″W
- Country: United States
- State: West Virginia
- County: Randolph
- Elevation: 2,425 ft (739 m)
- Time zone: UTC-5 (Eastern (EST))
  - Summer (DST): UTC-4 (EDT)
- GNIS ID: 1727190

Montes was an unincorporated community in Randolph County, West Virginia.
