= Gaetano Monti =

Italian sculptor (c. 1750 – 1824)

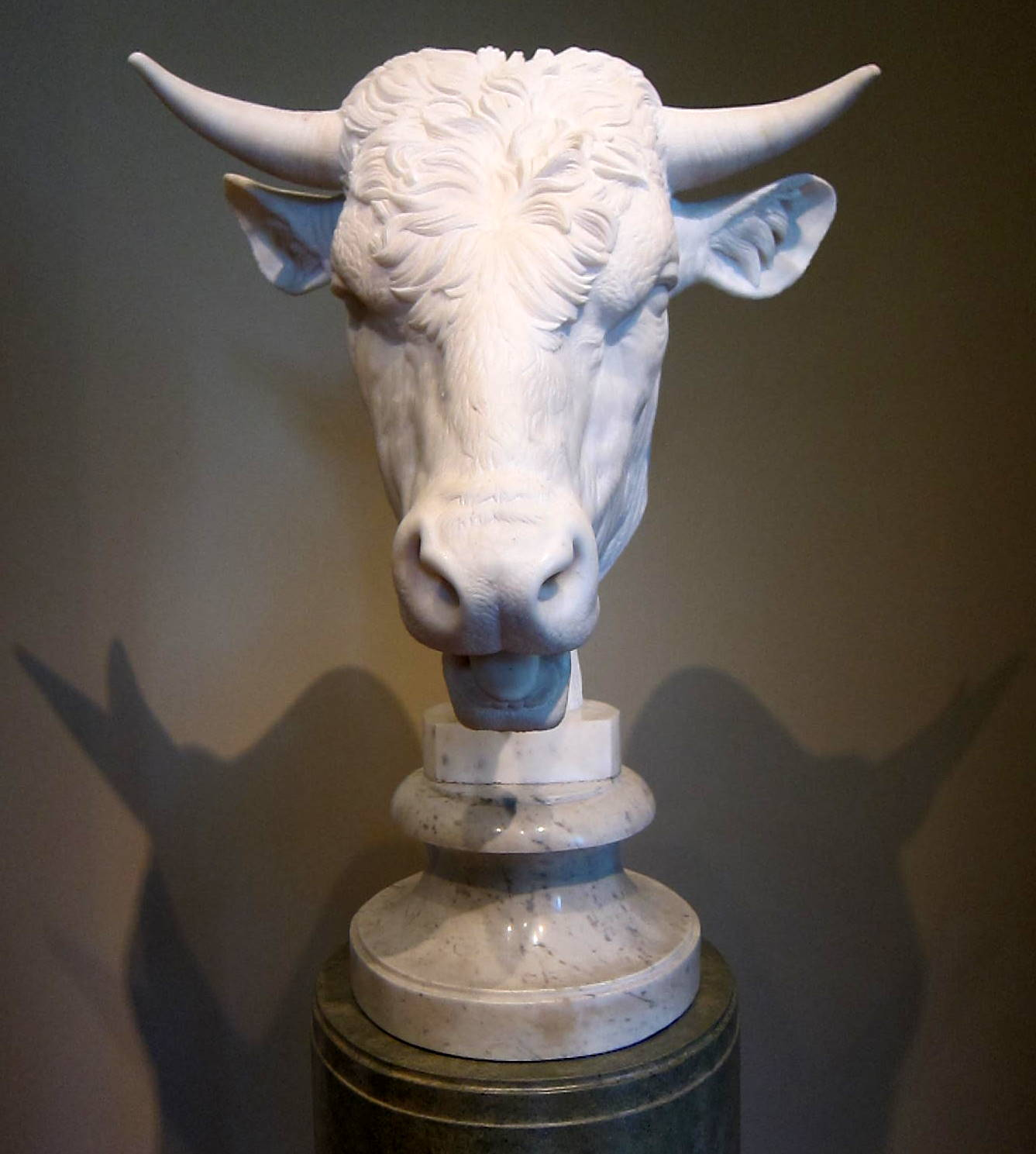
Head of a Bull (1824) in the National Gallery of Art, Washington, D.C.

Gaetano Monti (c. 1750 – 1824) was an Italian sculptor, active in Milan. Little is known about his career; he was, for a time, active as a teacher of anatomy at the Ospedale Maggiore, where he numbered among his pupils Andrea Appiani and Gaetano Matteo Monti. Monti is sometimes confused with the latter due to the similarity between their names and the fact that the younger artist also spent part of his career in Milan.
