= Gaetano Matteo Monti =

Italian sculptor

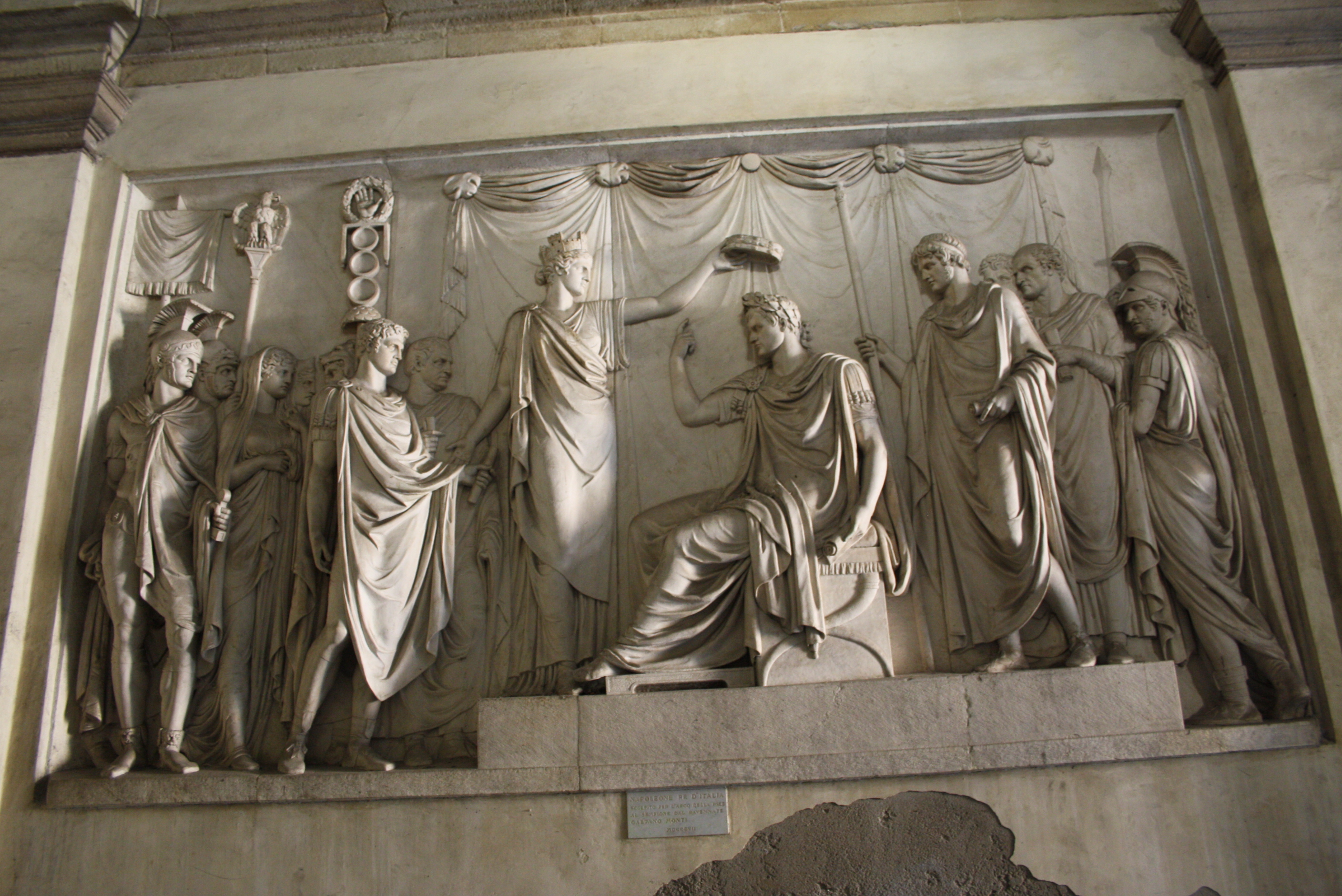
Gaetano Matteo Monti, Napoleon crowned King of Italy (1807). Originally place in Arco della Pace, but removed, now in Brera

Gaetano Matteo Monti (13 March 1776 in Ravenna – 27 May 1847 in Milan) was an Italian sculptor, working in the Neoclassical style.

He studied in Bologna and Rome and then moved to Milan, where he worked on Milan Cathedral (Duomo de Milano) and the Arco della Pace with a similarly named Milanese sculptor, Gaetano Monti (1750–1827).

His son was the sculptor Raffaelle Monti.

== Works ==
- Tomb of Count Paolo Tosio, Vantiniano Cemetery, Brescia 1842
- Bust of Countess Maria Laderchi of Faenza,).
- Bust of Ambrogio Calepino ca. 1839
- Monuments to Giuseppe Parini and Giuseppe Zanoja in Pinacoteca di Brera
- Tomb of Bishop Gabrio Maria Nava, Duomo of Brescia,
- Moses Fountain, at the Sacro Monte in Varese
- Tomb of Bishop Gabrio Maria Nava in Duomo of Brescia,
