= Luigi Guido Grandi =

Italian monk, philosopher and mathematician (1671–1742)

Dom Guido Grandi FRS
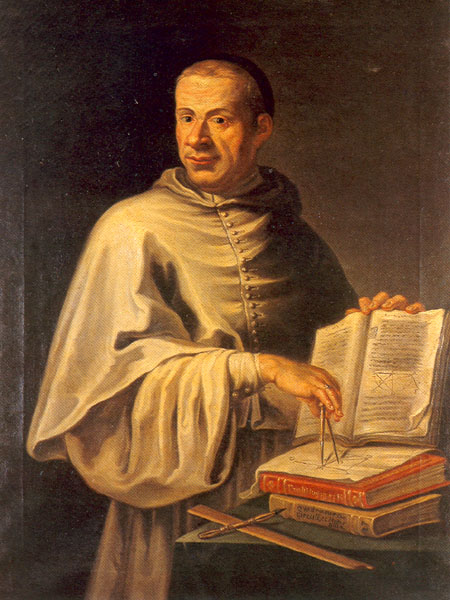
- Guido Grandi
- Born: Francesco Lodovico Grandi; 1 October 1671; Cremona, Duchy of Milan
- Died: 4 July 1742 (aged 70); Pisa, Grand Duchy of Tuscany
- Resting place: San Michele in Borgo
- Other name: Dubeno Erimanzio
- Known for: Studies on the rose curve Grandi's series
- Parent(s): Pietro Martire Grandi and Caterina Grandi (née Legati)
- Scientific career
- Fields: Mathematics
- Workplaces: University of Pisa
- Notable students: Giammaria Ortes; Giovanni Lami

Dom Guido Grandi, O.S.B. Cam. FRS (1 October 1671 – 4 July 1742) was an Italian monk, priest, philosopher, theologian, mathematician, and engineer.

== Life ==
Grandi was born on 1 October 1671 in Cremona, Italy and christened Luigi Francesco Lodovico. When he was of age, he was educated at the Jesuit college there. After he completed his studies there in 1687, he entered the novitiate of the Camaldolese monks at Ferrara and took the name of Guido. In 1693 he was sent to the Monastery of St. Gregory the Great, the Camaldolese house in Rome, to complete his studies in philosophy and theology in preparation for Holy Orders. A year later, Grandi was assigned as professor of both fields at the Camaldolese Monastery of St. Mary of the Angels in Florence. It appears that it was during this period of his life that he took an interest in mathematics. A review of his treatise Geometrica divinatio Vivianeorum problematum (1699) in the Acta Eruditorum brought him recognition in Italy and abroad. In 1700 the Grand Duke of Tuscany, Cosimo III de' Medici appointed him professor of philosophy at the University of Pisa. Among his pupils were several prominent intellectuals of the Italian Enlightenment, including Giovanni Lami, Giammaria Ortes and Pier Francesco Foggini.

By 1707, Dom Grandi had developed such a reputation in the field of mathematics that he was named court mathematician to Cosimo III. In that post, he also worked as an engineer, being appointed Superintendent of Water for the Duchy, and in that capacity, he was involved in the drainage of the Chiana Valley. In 1709 he visited England where he clearly impressed his colleagues there, as he was elected a Fellow of the Royal Society. The University of Pisa named him Professor of Mathematics in 1714. It was there that he died on 4 July 1742.

== Mathematical studies ==
In 1701 Grandi published a study of the conical loxodrome, followed by a study in 1703 of the curve which he named versiera, from the Latin: vertere (to turn). This curve was later studied by one of the few women scientists to achieve a degree, Maria Gaetana Agnesi. Through a mistranslation by the translator of her work into English who mistook the term "witch" (Italian: avversiera) for Grandi's term, this curve became known in English as the witch of Agnesi. It was through his studies on this curve that Grandi helped introduce Leibniz' ideas on calculus to Italy.

In mathematics Grandi is best known for his work Flores geometrici (1728), studying the rose curve, a curve which has the shape of a petalled flower, and for Grandi's series. He named the rose curve rhodonea. He also contributed to the Note on the Treatise of Galileo Concerning Natural Motion in the first Florentine edition of Galileo Galilei's works.

== List of works ==
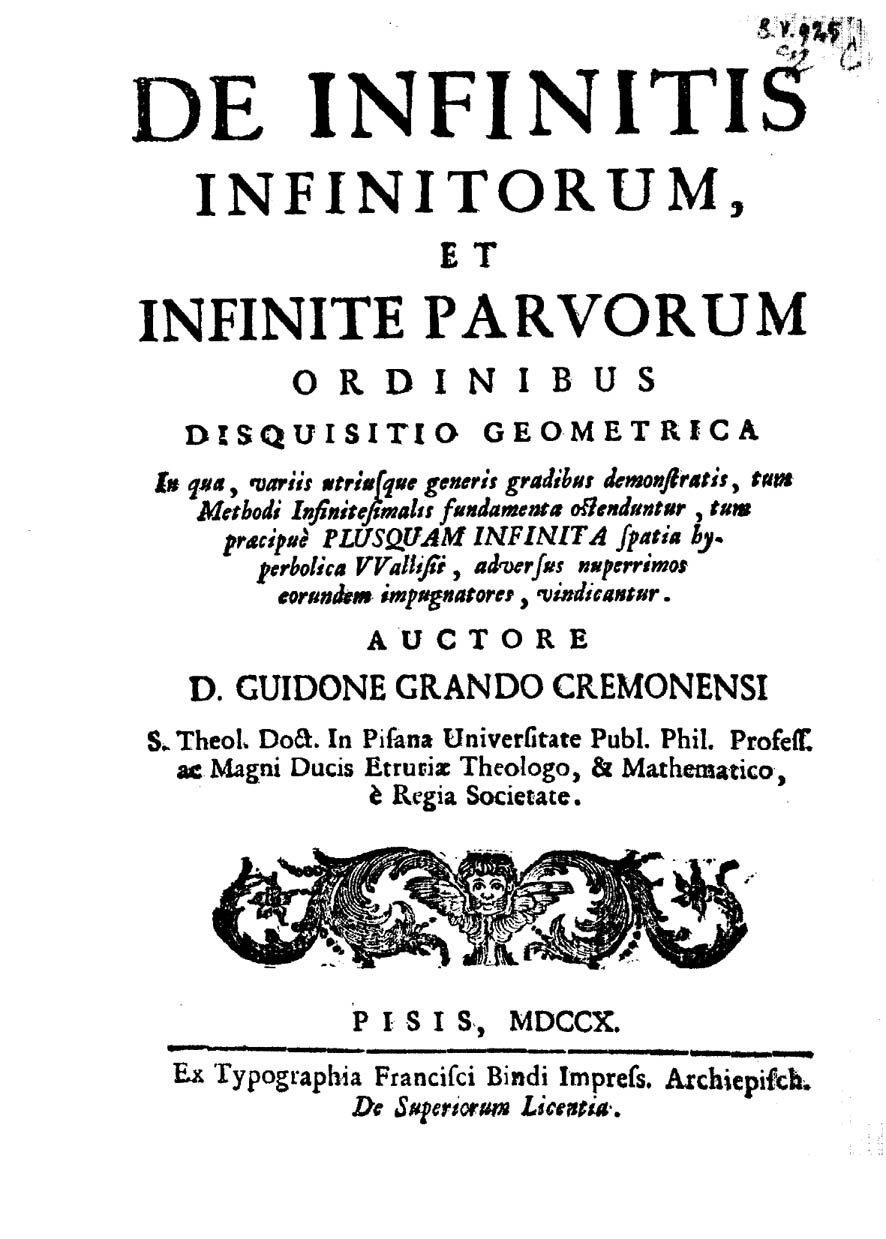
De infinitis infinitorum

- Geometrica demonstratio Vivianeorum problematum. Florentiae: ex Typographia Iacobi de Guiduccis propè Conductam. 1699.
- De infinitis infinitorum, et infinite parvorum ordinibus disquisitio geometrica. Pisis: ex Typographia Francisci Bindi impress. archiepisch. 1710.
- Epistola mathematica de momento gravium in planis inclinatis. Lucae: typis Peregrini Frediani. 1711.
- Dialoghi circa la controversia eccitatagli contro dal sig. Alessandro Marchetti. In Lucca: ad istanza di Francesco Maria Gaddi librajo in Pisa. 1712.
- Prostasis ad exceptiones clari Varignonii libro De infinitis infinitorum ordinibus oppositas circa magnitudinum plusquam-infinitarum Vallisii defensionem et anguli contactus. Pisis: ex Typographia Francisci Bindi impress. archiepisch. 1713.
- Del movimento dell'acque trattato geometrico. Firenze.
- Relazione delle operazioni fatte circa il padule di Fucecchio. In Lucca: per Leonardo Venturini. 1718.
- Trattato delle resistenze. Firenze: per Tartini e Franchi. 1718.
- Compendio delle Sezioni coniche d'Apollonio con aggiunta di nuove proprietà delle medesime sezioni. In Firenze: nella Stamperia di S.A.R. per gli Tartini e Franchi. 1722.
- Instituzioni meccaniche. In Firenze: nella Stamperia di S.A.R. per Gio: Gaetano Tartini e Santi Franchi. 1739.
- Istituzioni di aritmetica pratica. In Firenze: nella Stamperia di S.A.R. per Gio: Gaetano Tartini e Santi Franchi. 1740.
- Sectionum conicarum synopsis. Florentiae: ex typographio Ioannis Paulli Giovannelli. 1750.

== See also ==
- Tommaso Perelli
