= Urbano Monti =

Italian cartographer (1544–1613)

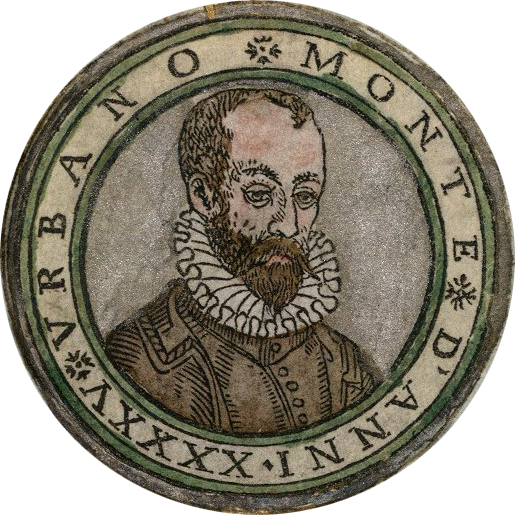
- Self-portrait in the Trattato universale. Descrittione et sito de tutta la Terra sin qui conosciuta.
- Born: 15 August 1544; Milan, Duchy of Milan
- Died: 15 May 1613 (aged 68); Milan, Duchy of Milan
- Resting place: San Carlo al Corso, Milan
- Occupations: Geographer; Cartographer
- Spouse: Margarita Niguarda
- Children: 5
- Parent(s): Giovanni Battista Monti and Angela de Menclozzi

Urbano Monti (16 August 1544 – 15 May 1613), alternatively spelt Urbano Monte, was an Italian geographer and cartographer.

== Life ==
He was born and raised in Milan, Italy, in a family of the minor nobility. He grew up together with his two younger brothers and his paternal cousins in the family house in Milan. Despite his noble status, Monti never held public office, but instead occupied himself with scholarship, particularly history and geography, with administering the family property, and with philanthropic endeavours. At the age of 35, he married eighteen-year-old Margarita Niguarda, by whom he had four sons and one daughter. He died in Milan on 15 May 1613 and was buried in the family chapel in the church of San Carlo al Corso.

== Career ==
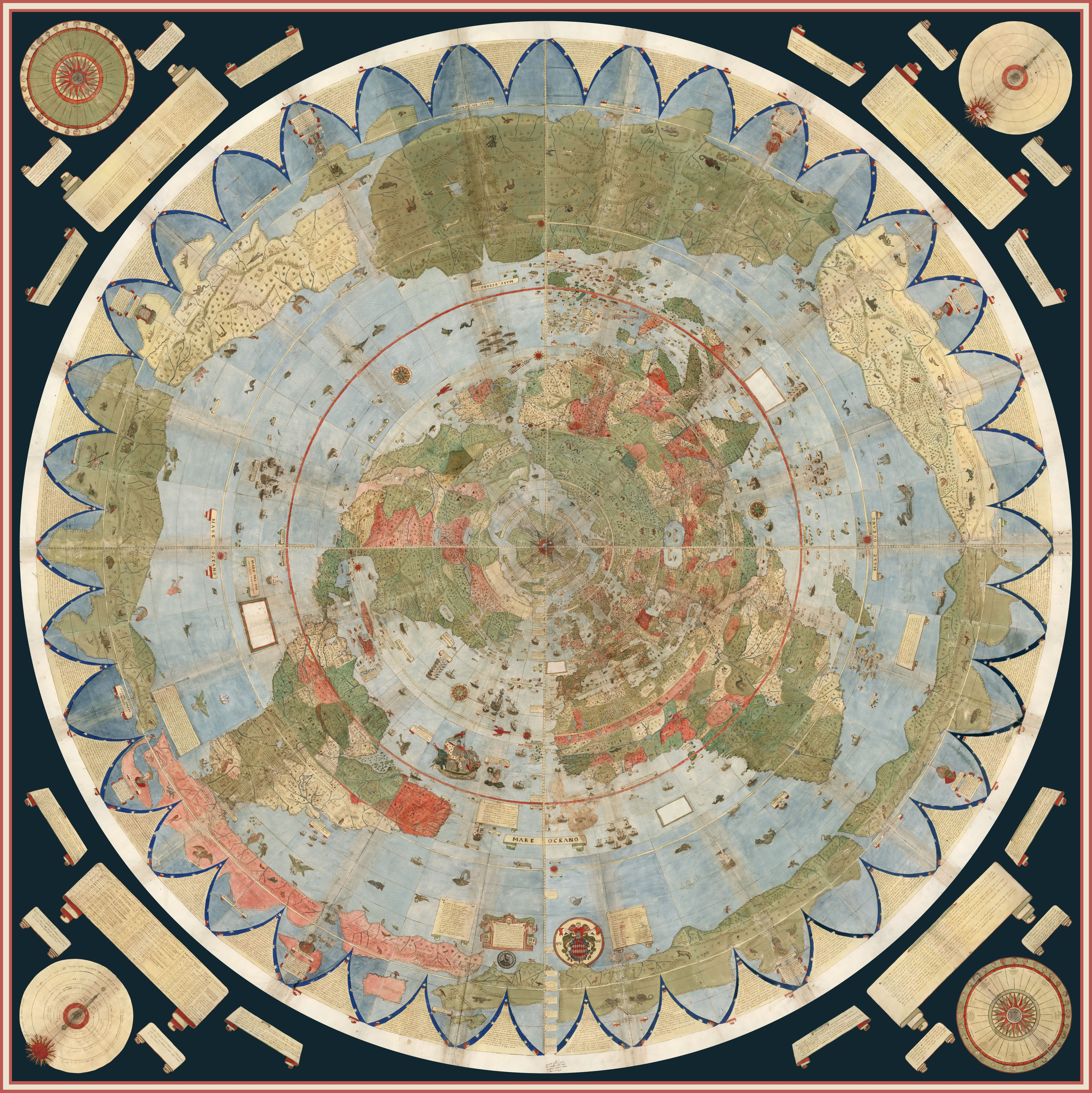
Monti's world map

Monti's most famous work is a large-scale world map accompanied by a multi-volume treatise on geography and cosmology. The map reflects the geographical knowledge of his time, but in some ways it is surprisingly advanced. While drawing on the works of other early modern cartographers like Gerardus Mercator and Abraham Ortelius, he included some of the most recent discoveries of his time, including the archipelago of Tierra del Fuego. His depiction of Japan is particularly detailed and contains many place names not present on other Western maps of the time.

One of the only three surviving copies of Monti's world map is today a part of the David Rumsey Map Collection of Stanford University and have been recently digitized.

== Notable works ==
His notable books include:

- Descrizione del mondo sin qui conosciuto
- Un prezioso cimelio della cartografia italiana

== Sources ==
- Picinelli, Filippo (1670). Ateneo dei letterati milanesi. Milan: Francesco Vigone. p. 515.
- Almagià, Roberto (1941). "Un prezioso cimelio della cartografia italiana Il planisfero di Urbano Monti". La Bibliofilía. 43 (7/9): 156–193. JSTOR 26210250.
- Miller, Greg (2017). "Bizarre, Enormous 16th-Century Map Assembled for First Time". National Geographic.
- Van Duzer, Chet (2020). "Urbano Monte's World Maps: Sources and Development" (PDF). Imago temporis: medium Aevum. XIV: 415–435. doi:10.21001/itma.2020.14.15.
- D'Ascenzo, Annalisa (2012). "MONTI, Urbano". Dizionario Biografico degli Italiani (in Italian). Vol. 76: Montauti–Morlaiter. Rome: Istituto dell'Enciclopedia Italiana. ISBN 978-88-12-00032-6.
