= Montie =

Montie is a given name and surname. Notable people with the name include:

- Montie Brewer (born 1957), former president and CEO of Air Canada
- Montie Montana (1910–1998), American rodeo trick rider and trick roper, actor, stuntman and cowboy born Owen Harlen Mickel
- Montie Rissell (born 1959), American serial killer and rapist
- Irene Montie (1921–2018), American statistician

== See also ==
- Monte (disambiguation)
- Monti (disambiguation)
- Monty (disambiguation)
