= Paxino da Nova =

Italian painter

Paxino da Nova was an Italian painter of the second half of the 14th century active in Bergamo.

== Biography ==
He was born in Bergamo. He painted in nave of Santa Maria Maggiore in Bergamo. Among his pupils was Bartolomeo, son of Isnardo De Goldi.
