= Donizetti's birthplace =

- Casa natale di Gaetano Donizetti
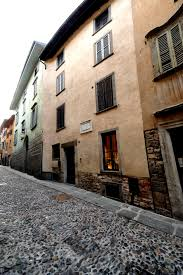
- Interactive map of the Donizetti's birthplace area

General information
- Location: Via Borgo Canale, 14, Bergamo, Italy
- Coordinates: 45°42′22.71″N 9°39′22.15″E

Website
- casanatale.donizetti.org/en/

Donizetti's birthplace (Casa natale di Gaetano Donizetti) is a cultural site in Bergamo, in Lombardy, Italy. The composer Gaetano Donizetti was born here on 29 November 1797; since 2009 it has been a museum.

The building is open to visitors on Sundays; special visits on Monday to Friday may be arranged by appointment.

== History ==
The composer was the youngest of three sons in the family. They lived in the basement of the house, and Donizetti's father was caretaker of the municipal pawnshop. Donizetti's musical education began as a choirboy at Santa Maria Maggiore, where the maestro di cappella Simon Mayr recognized his musical ability.

The oldest parts of the building date from the 14th/15th centuries. Facing Via Borgo Canale, it shows four storeys; on the other side of the house, facing Via degli Orti downhill, there are five storeys above ground.

The building was purchased by the Municipality of Bergamo in 1925, and was declared a national monument the following year. It continued in use as a residential building from the mid-1930s until the mid-1960s. In 1948 (the centenary of the composer's death) and 1973, the basement was restored and opened to the public. The entire building was restored from 2007 and opened to the public in 2009, the space within being organized by the Donizetti Foundation.

== Description ==
The basement where the Donizetti family lived, now bare of furniture, can be viewed. The ground floor has display boards outlining the lives of the composer and his teacher Simon Mayr. On the floor above there is a large room dedicated to the theatre, Donizetti being known above all as a composer of operas. The next floor houses a small auditorium, where meetings and cultural events may take place.

== See also ==
- Donizetti Museum
- List of music museums
