= Grata of Bergamo =

Saint Grata of Bergamo
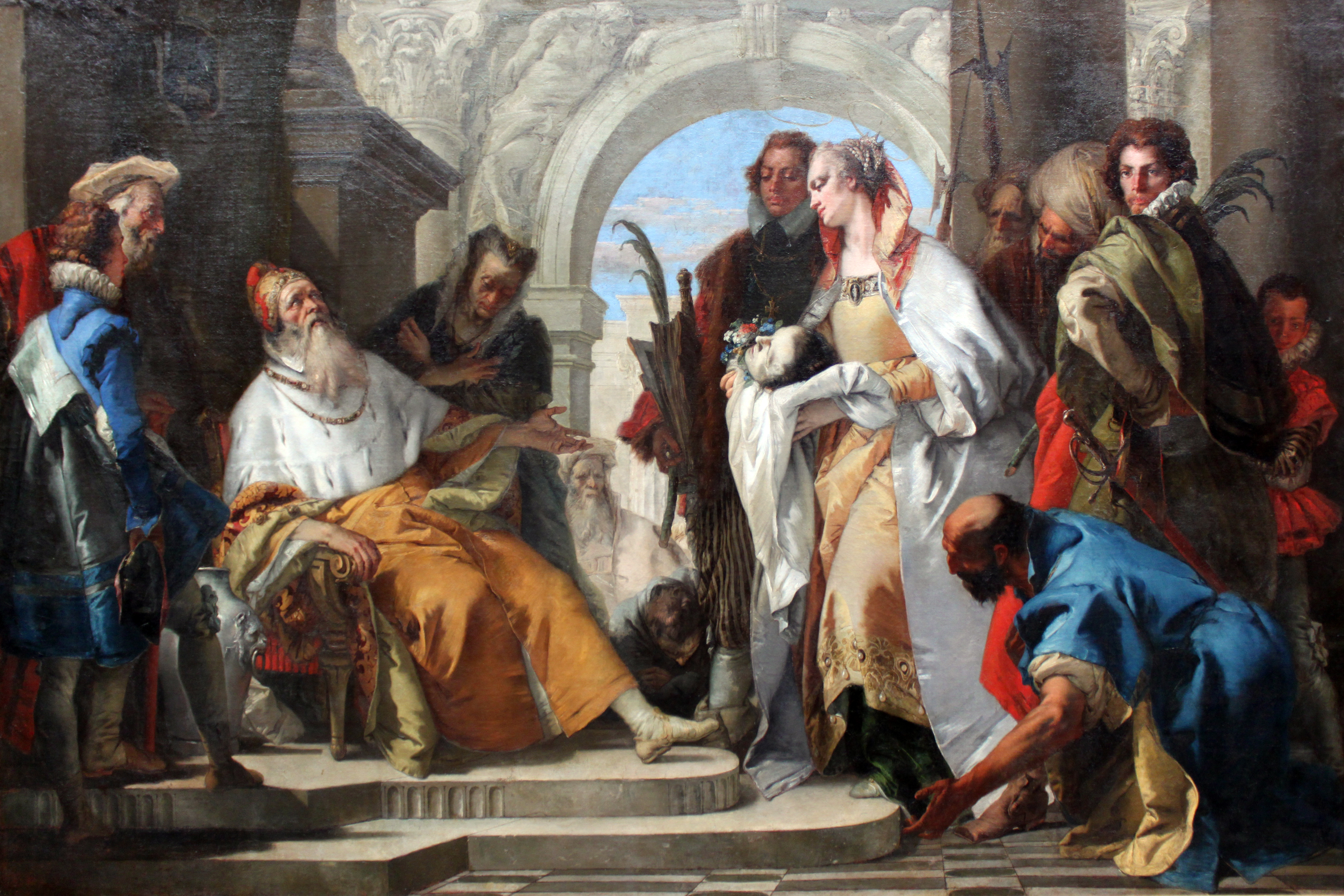
- The Patron Saints of the Crotta Family (1750), by Giovanni Domenico Tiepolo. Saint Grata is presenting the head of the martyred St. Alexander to her father.

Martyr
- Died: 307; Bergamo, Italy
- Venerated in: Catholic Church, Antiochian Orthodox Church, Eastern Orthodox Church
- Patronage: Bergamo

Grata of Bergamo (early 4th century) is an Italian saint and martyr, and sister of Asteria of Bergamo. Her parents were Saint Lupo of Bergamo and Saint Adelaide, duke and duchess of Bergamo. According to hagiographer Agnes B.C. Dunbar, Grata's husband was "a great king in Germany". She did not become a Christian until after his death, when she converted her parents to Christianity and persuaded them to build the cathedral of Bergamo. She became known as a holy woman in Bergamo, "especially for her zeal in securing Christian burial for the bodies of martyrs". She built three churches and a hospital for the poor in Begamo. She and her sister Asteria buried the body of St. Alexander of Rome, after Grata wrapped his head in a napkin. After her parents' death, she governed Bergamo "with wisdom and benevolence". Grata was put to death for burying Alexander. Her feast day is September 4.

She is the co-patron of the city of Bergamo. St. Grata seems to have been a popular subject for female writers, being the subject of a 1596 biography by Flavia Grumelli and a 1723 one by the nun Maria Aurelia Tassis. The Church of San Grata Inter Vites (in English, "among the vines") because it was surrounded by vineyards until 17th century in Bergamo, where she was buried until 1000 CE, is dedicated in her honor. Her body was moved to another church, also named for her, inside the city's walls.

== Asteria of Bergamo ==
Saint Asteria of Bergamo martyr
- Died: 307; Bergamo, Italy
- Venerated in: Catholic Church, Antiochian Orthodox Church
- Patronage: Bergamo

Asteria of Bergamo, also called Hesteria (died 307) is an Italian saint and martyr, and sister of Grata of Bergamo. She is the patroness saint of Bergamo in Northern Italy.

Asteria and Grata, at the time of Diocletian and Maximian, buried Alexander of Rome. Grata was put to death; Asteria buried her, and then she was arrested, and tortured. An ancient epitaph describes her as having been beheaded as a Christian under Diocletian, when she had already reached her sixtieth year. Asteria, Grata, and Alexander were all martyred for refusing to worship the god Jupiter as Maximian had ordered.

Asteria's feast day is 10 August.
