= Luigi Deleidi =

Italian painter (1784–1853)

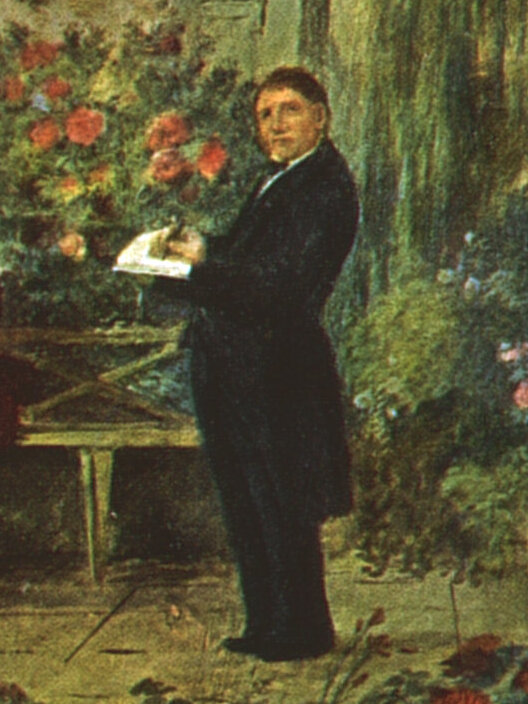
Self-portrait, detail from Donizetti and friends, 1840

Luigi Deleidi (15 November 1784, Bergamo - 2 September 1853, Bergamo) was an Italian Pre-Romantic painter; primarily of landscapes and vedute. He was often referred to by his nickname, "Il Nebbia" (The Fog).

== Biography ==
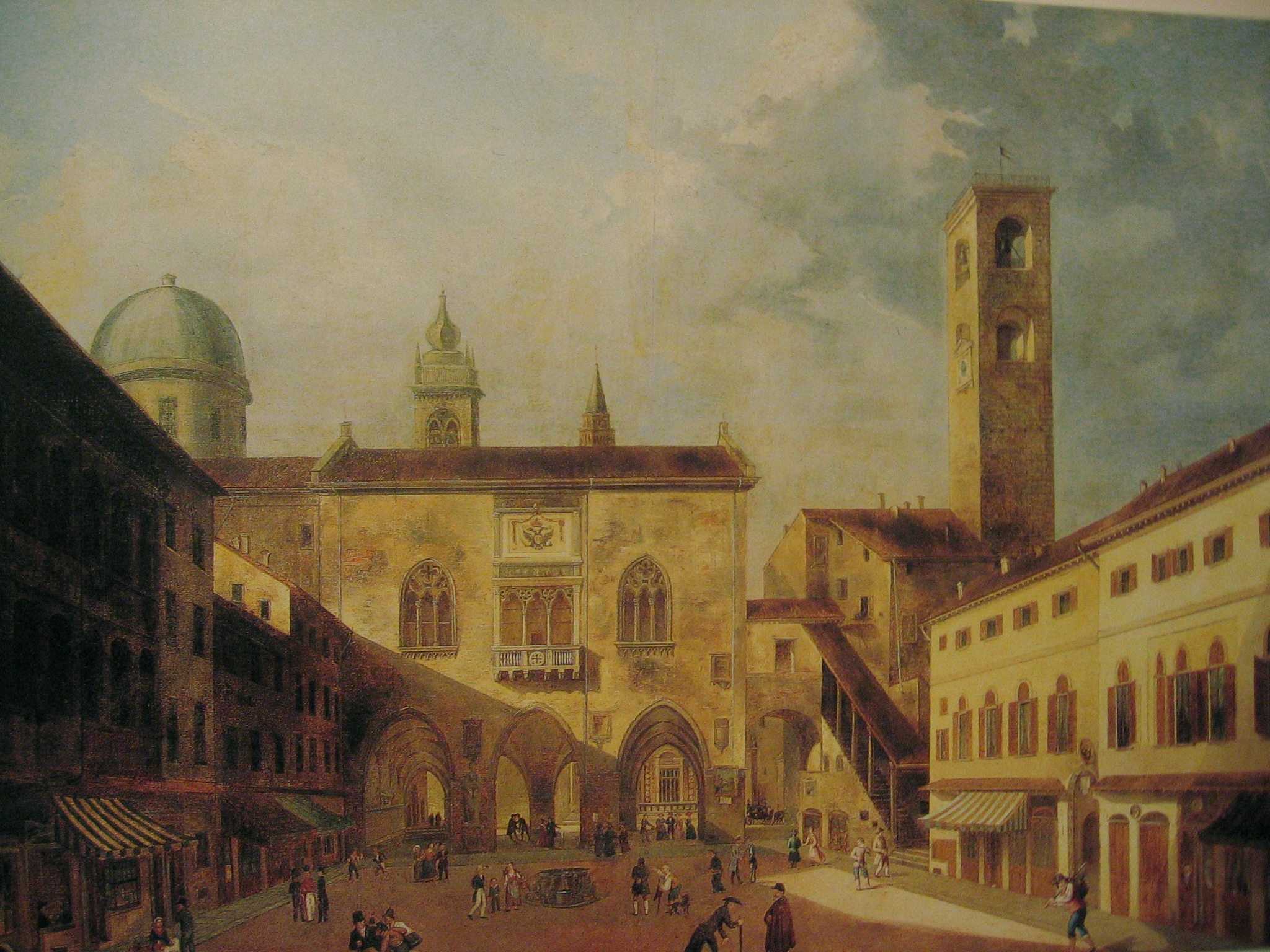
Piazza Vecchia, the old square of Bergamo, now in the Accademia Carrara

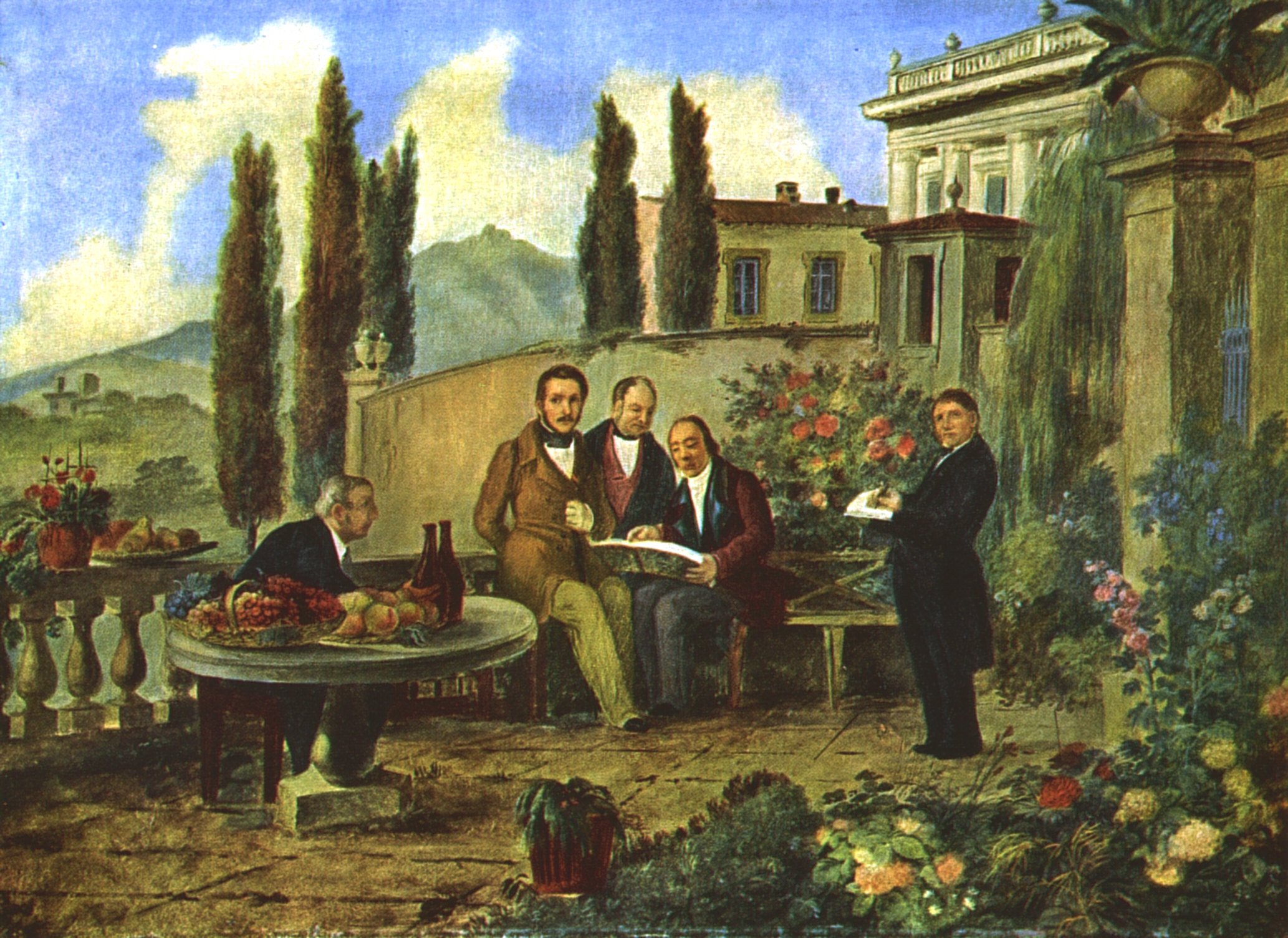
Donizetti and friends, 1840, now in the Museo Donizettiano in Bergamo. From left: Luigi Bettinelli, Gaetano Donizetti, Antonio Dolci, Simon Mayr and Luigi Deleidi

He was born to an artistically inclined family. His mother was the daughter of Pietro Antonio Gualdi Lodrini, a well-known local painter of religious works, and his brother Marco (1780-1843) also became a painter, although none of his works have been positively identified. After displaying an ability to draw at an early age, Luigi was sent to the "Scuola di Pittura e Scenografia" in Milan, where he studied with Alessandro Sanquirico. He may have visited Rome at this time, and returned to Bergamo in 1825.

He decided to specialize in landscapes and was nicknamed "The Fog" because his paintings all had a slightly hazy color, and many were set in the winter.

He was a talented musician as well, and often played the bassoon with local orchestras or, occasionally, as a soloist. He performed at both the Teatro Sociale and the Teatro Riccardi (now known as the Teatro Donizetti). In fact, he was a friend of Donizetti and an associate of other Bergamese artists, including Giuseppe Diotti, Francesco Coghetti and Paolo Vincenzo Bonomini.

Many members of the local nobility commissioned him to do frescoes at their villas, and he obtained many similar commissions during a stay in Rome from 1837 to 1842. Notable among these are the frescoes at the Castello di Calepio and the Castello di Costa di Mezzate, both belonging to the Vertova family. He is also credited with decorations at a building owned by the Torlonia family, identified as either the Villa Torlonia at Castel Gandolfo, or the Palazzo Torlonia. If the latter, he probably worked together with his friend, Coghetti. He also decorated several theaters and participated in the production design.

He died, unmarried, at his home in 1853. The cause was given as apoplexy. It is unknown if he ever had any students. In 1856, a bust of him by Giovanni Maria Benzoni was placed in the Accademia Carrara.
