= Donizetti Museum =

- Museo Donizettiano
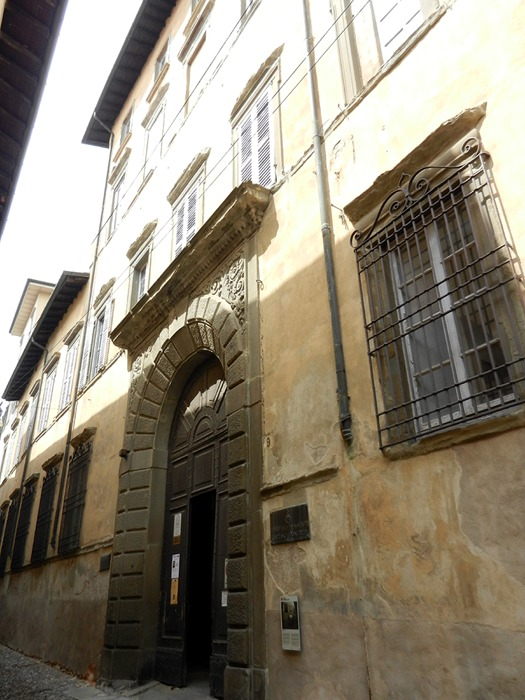

General information
- Address: Via Arena, 9
- Town or city: Bergamo
- Country: Italy
- Coordinates: 45°42′13.81″N 9°39′36.18″E

Website
- www.donizetti.org/en/visit-bergamo/the-donizetti-museum/

The Donizetti Museum (Museo Donizettiano) is a cultural site in Bergamo, in Lombardy, Italy. It is dedicated to the composer Gaetano Donizetti (1797–1848), who was born in the city.

== History ==
The centenary in 1897 of the composer's birth was marked in Bergamo by an exhibition at the Palazzo delle Scuole in Contrada Tre Passi, and the unveiling of the Donizetti Monument in Piazza Cavour. From these events the idea of a permanent exhibition originated.

The Rota Basoni family had looked after the composer during the last months of his life. In 1902 Giovanna Ginevra Rota Basoni, widow of Giovanmaria Scotti, donated what the family possessed at Palazzo Scotti of the composer's belongings to the Congregation of Charity of Bergamo; these included the furnishings of the room where the composer died, a portrait painted in 1848 by Giuseppe Rillosi, autograph scores, books and personal belongings.

They were donated on condition that the material should be preserved in a museum. The collection was the basis of the Donizetti Museum, which opened in September 1906. Further exhibits have been added over the following decades. Guido Zavadini (1868–1958) was the museum's director from 1909 to his death, and published a catalogue of the museum in 1936.

== Description ==
The museum is on the first floor of the Domus Magna, in Via Arena. An exhibition of portraits, memorabilia and documents shows the composer at different stages of his life: his studies in Bergamo and Bologna from 1806 to 1817, the developing composer to 1822, and the successful composer of operas between then and 1845. It also shows the personal life of Donizetti, and, through autograph scores, the composer at work.

== See also ==
- Donizetti's birthplace
- List of music museums
