= The Patron Saints of the Crotta Family =

1750 painting by Giovanni Domenico Tiepolo

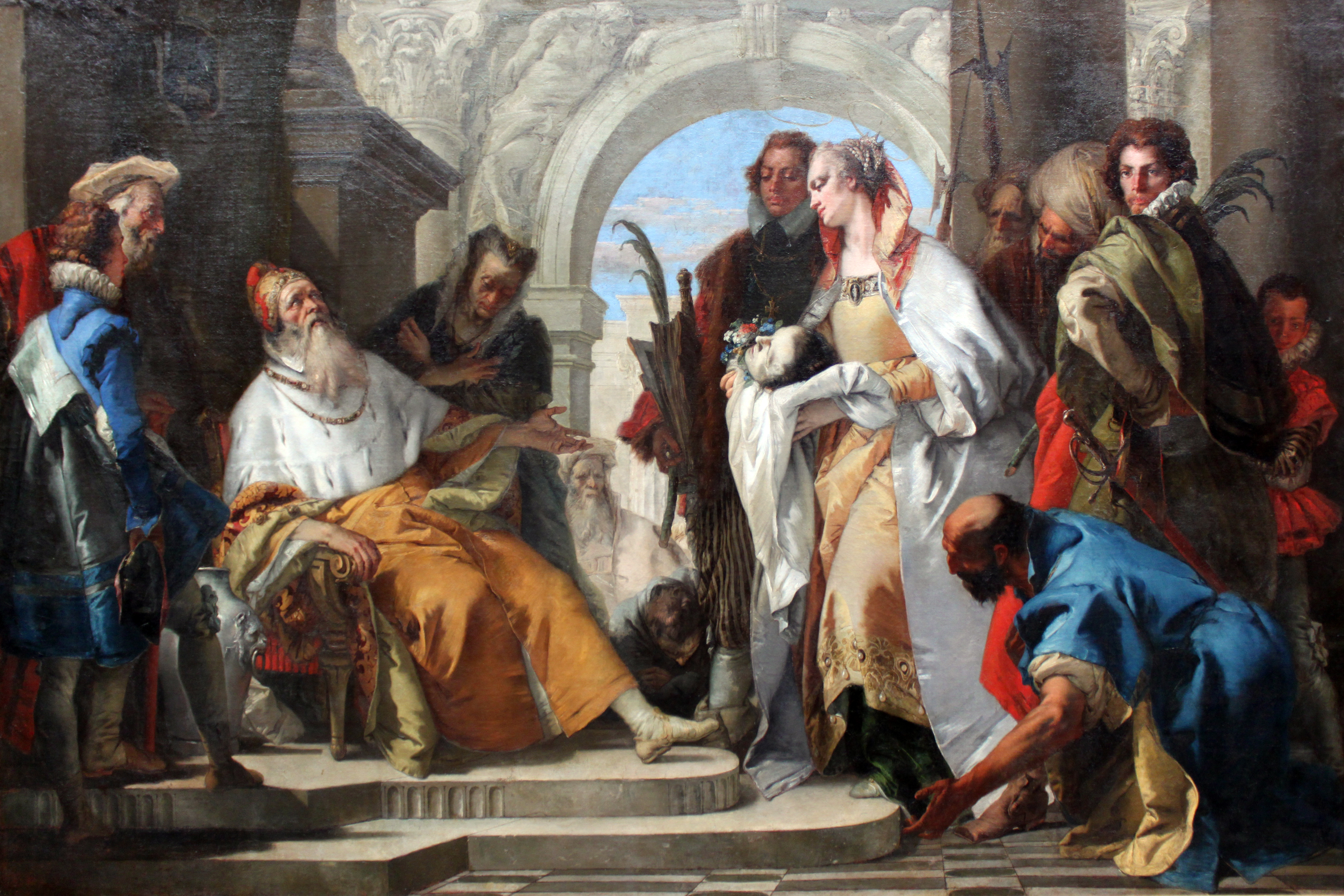
- Artist: Giovanni Domenico Tiepolo
- Year: 1750
- Subject: St. Grata converts the Crotta family to Christianity
- Dimensions: 194 × 318.5 cm
- Location: Städel Museum, Frankfurt
- Owner: Städel Museum

The Patron Saints of the Crotta Family is a 1750 oil painting by the Italian artist Giovanni Domenico Tiepolo.

The work depicts the legend of St. Grata, supposedly an ancestor of the Crotta family. Grata, accompanied by the martyrs Firmus and Rusticus, presents her pagan father with the head of Alexander of Bergamo. Instead of blood flowing from the disembodied head, flowers bloom from the wound. Having seen this miraculous sight, Grata's father embraces Christianity and introduces it to Bergamo.

The Crotta family, Bergamese transplants to Venice, were looking to burnish their Venetian social standing with this painting.
