= Santa Maria Maggiore, Bergamo =

Coordinates: 45°42′11″N 9°39′44″E

Santa Maria Maggiore
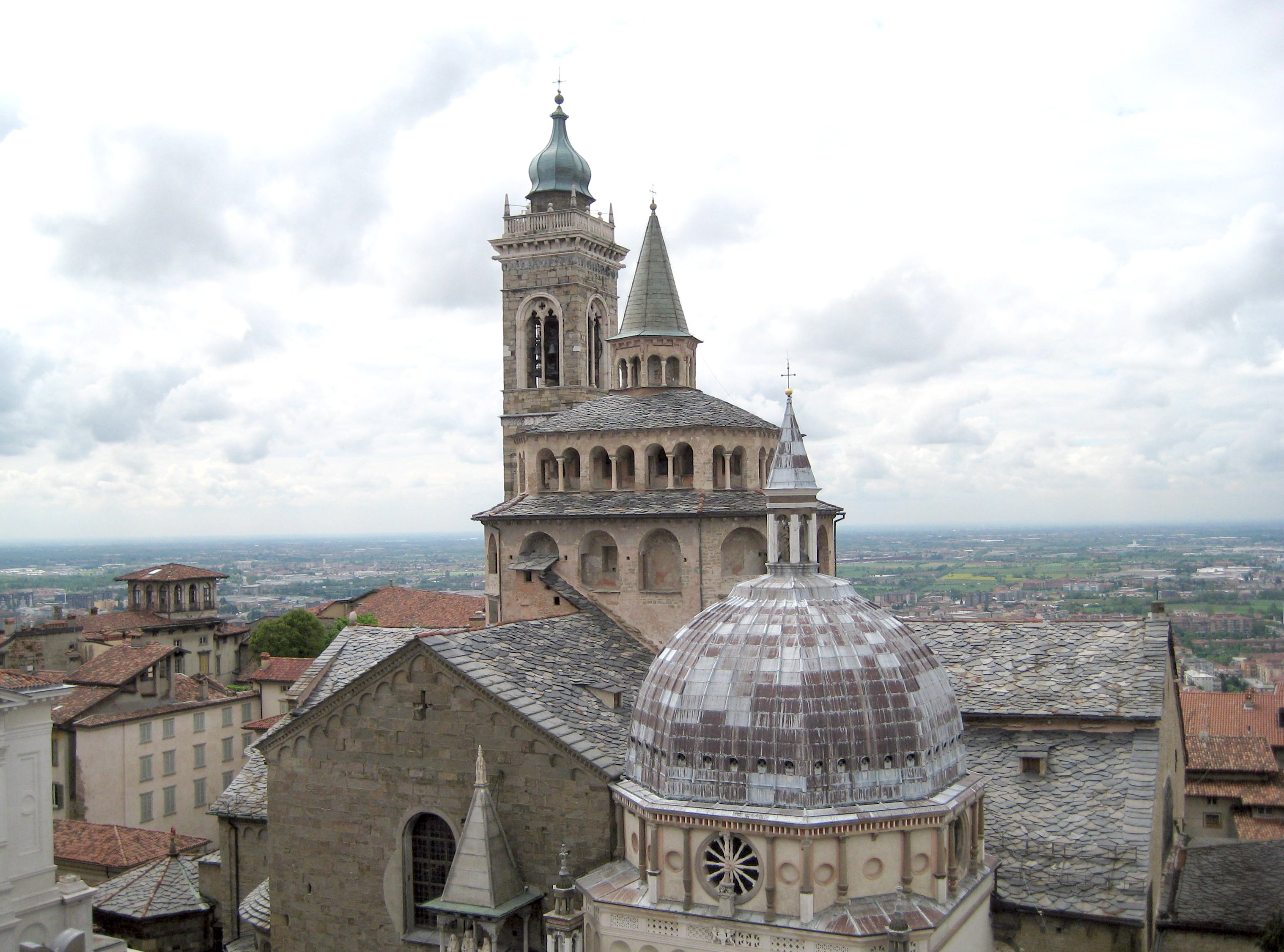
- Santa Maria Maggiore
- Location: Bergamo
- Country: Italy
- Denomination: Catholic
- Website: Official website

History
- Status: Minor Basilica

Architecture
- Functional status: Active
- Style: Romanesque exterior, Baroque interior

Administration
- Diocese: Bergamo

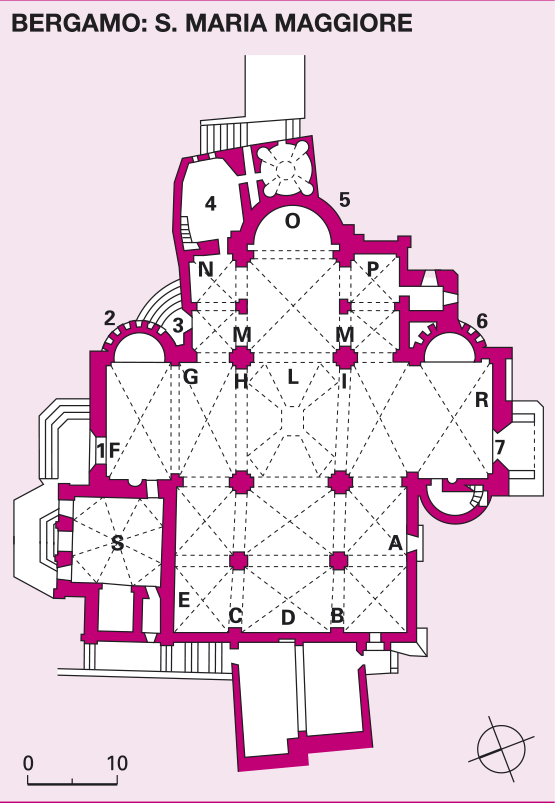
Church plan

The Basilica of Santa Maria Maggiore is a major church in the upper town of Bergamo, Northern Italy.

== History ==
According to the popular tradition, partially supported by documents, the church was built to comply with a vow made to the Virgin Mary in 1133 by the citizens of Bergamo to protect the city from the plague that was hitting northern Italy at that time.

The inscription on the portal of the southern entrance (known as entrance of the "White Lions") says that the church was founded in 1137 on the site of another church from the 8th century dedicated to St Mary, which had been in turn erected over a Roman temple of the Clemence. The high altar was consecrated in 1185 and in 1187 the presbytery and the transept wings were completed. Due to financial troubles, the works dragged for the whole 13th–14th centuries. The bell tower was built from 1436 (being completed around the end of the century), while in 1481–1491 a new sacristy added after the old one had been destroyed by Bartolomeo Colleoni to erect his personal mausoleum, the Colleoni Chapel.

On the 23 of June 1449, the Senate and the Grand Council of Bergamo entrusted the management of the church to the Consorzio della Misericordia Maggiore, a prestigious association founded in 1265 by Pinamonte da Brembate, in order to preserve and enrich the artistic heritage of the Basilica. On the 14 of March 1453, Pope Nicholas V declared the church exempt from episcopal jurisdiction, and dependent on papal jurisdiction. This allowed the creation of free grammar and music schools for children in need, at the service of the liturgies in the Basilica.

In 1521, Pietro Isabello finished the south-western portal, also known as Porta della Fontana. The edifice was restored and modified in the 17th century.

== Architecture ==
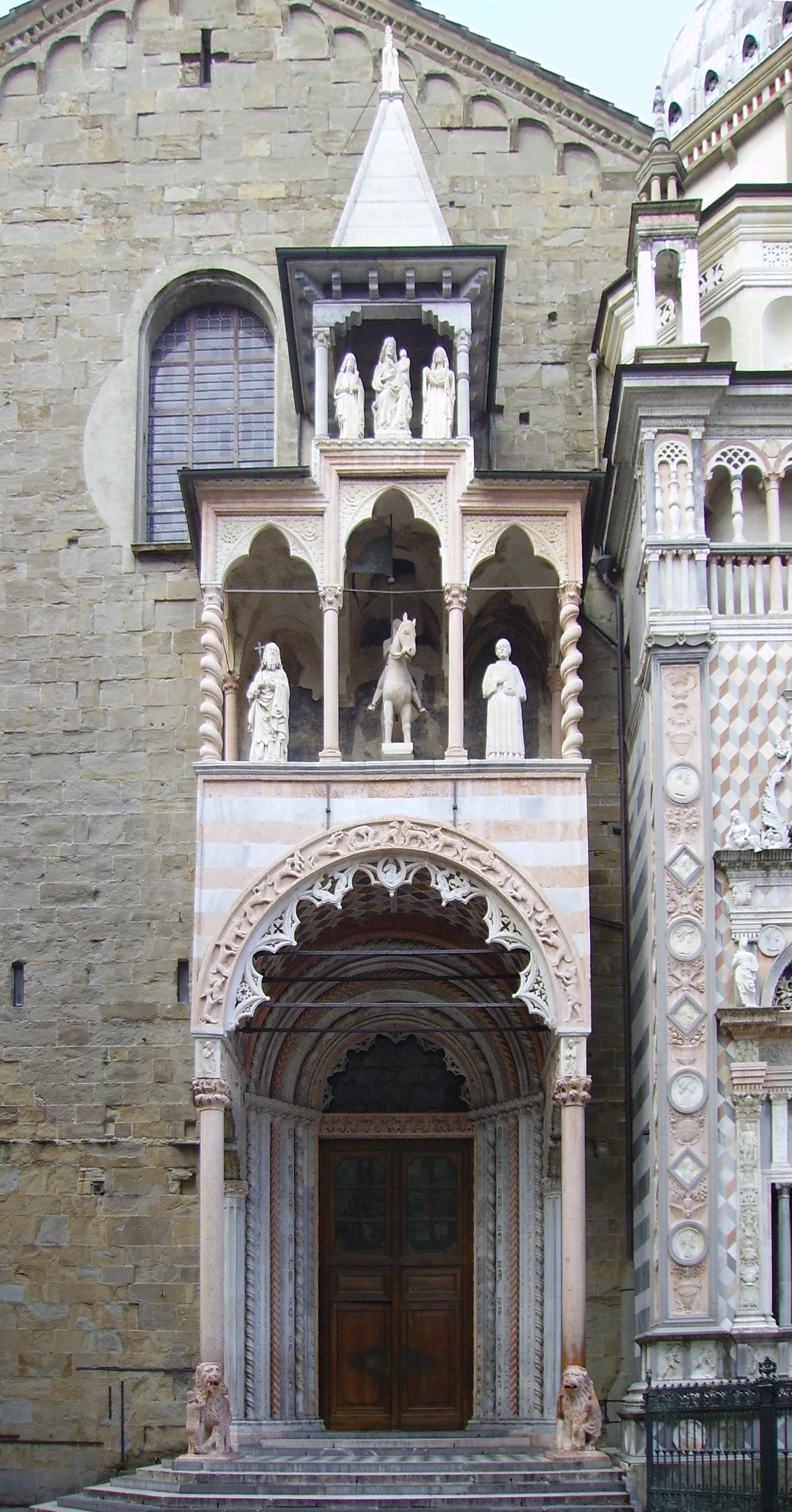
Giovanni da Campione's porch on the left transept.

The church opens on the square (Piazza Duomo) on its own left side, as the main façade has no entrance, being once united to the Bishops' Palace. The external appearance has largely maintained its Lombard Romanesque origins. The church can be accessed by two entrances by Giovanni da Campione (1353) and by Isabello's Porta della Fontana.

The main apse is crowned by a loggia surmounted by two frieze with geometrical and vegetables patterns, and has blind arcades with semi-columns. The latter's capitals have also vegetable themes, with the exception of one, decorated by Angels with Last Judgement's Trumpets. The transept's apses have a structure similar to the main one.

Notable is Giovanni da Campione's porch in the left transept, which is supported by columns departing from lions in Veronese marble. the arch has a frieze with hunting scenes, while the vault is decorated by polychrome lozenges. A loggia houses statues of St Barbara, St Vincent and St Alexander. At the peak is a Gothic niche by Hans von Fernach (1403), with the Madonna with Child flanked by St Esther and St Grata (1398). also by Giovanni da Campione is the porch of the right transept, with a similar though simpler structure. The columns are supported by lions in white marble. It has reliefs with Christ Crowned by Saints and Birth of the Baptist.

Isabello's Renaissance porch has, in the lunette, a fresco of Mary's Nativity attributed to Andrea Previtali.

== Interior ==
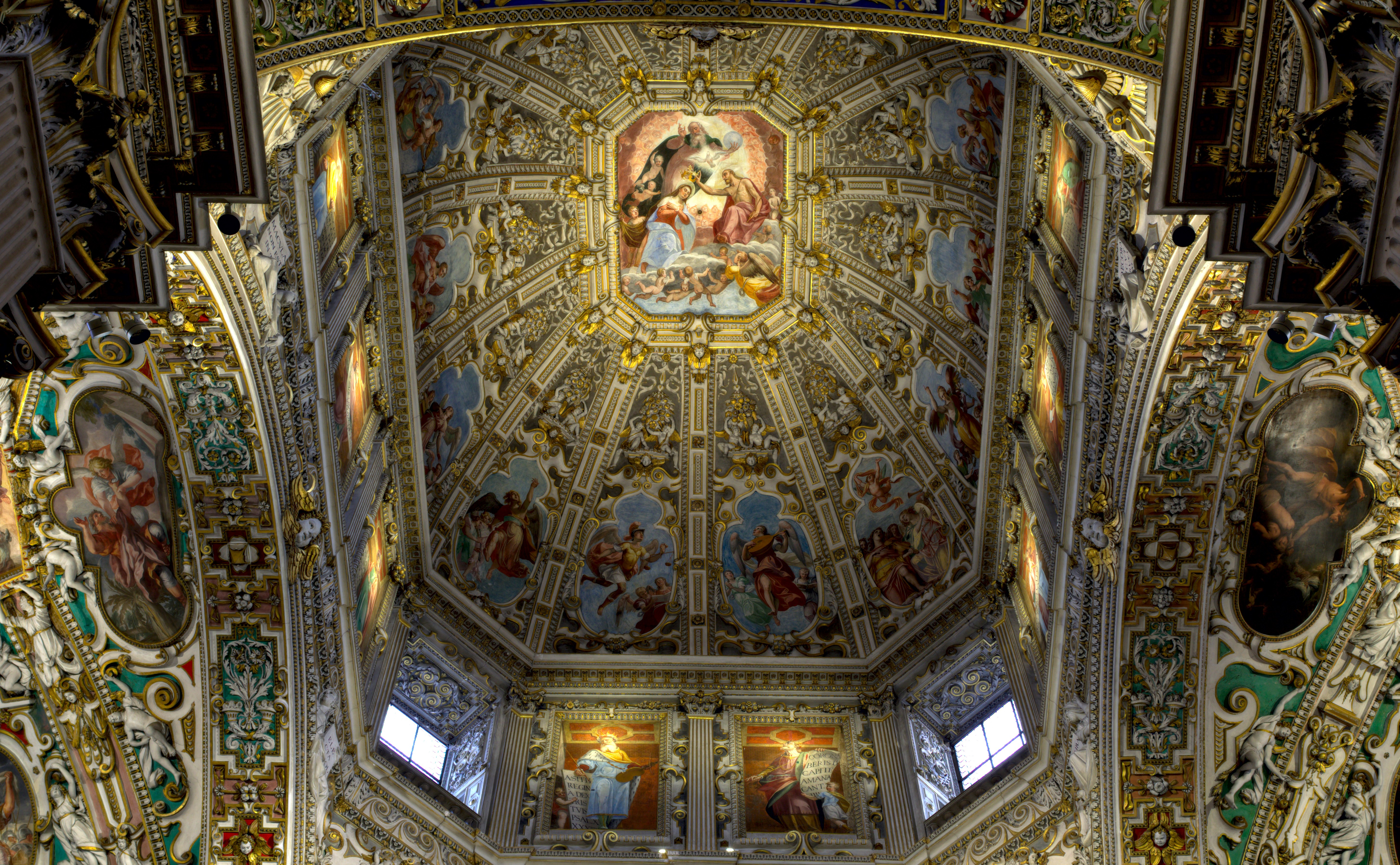
Interior view of dome

The interior has maintained the original Romanesque Greek cross plan, with a nave and two aisles divided by piers and ending with an apse, but the decoration its largely from the 17th century Baroque renovation.

On the walls are tapestries, partly executed in Florence (1583–1586) under Alessandro Allori's design, partly of Flemish manufacture, depicting the Life of Mary. Over the tapestry of the Crucifixion (executed in Antwerp on Ludwig van Schoor's cartoons, 1698) is a painting by Luca Giordano, with the Passage of the Red Sea (1691).

Left to the entrance is the sepulchre of Cardinal Guglielmo Longhi, work by Ugo da Campione (1313–1320). At the beginning of the left aisle is the Baroque confessional carved by Andrea Fantoni in 1704. A crucifix from the 14th century is on the presbytery's balustrade. On the rear wall are the tomb of the composer Gaetano Donizetti, by Vincenzo Vela (1855) and that of the latter's master Simone Mayr (1852). Mayr established the Bergamo Conservatory at the Santa Maria Maggiore in 1805, and the church operated the school until it became an independent institution in 1908. Donizetti was an early pupil at the conservatory.

In the presbytery itself, housing six bronze candelabra from 1597, is a wooden choir designed by Bernardo Zenale and Andrea Previtali. The reliefs with Biblical tales were executed in 1524–1555 on designs by Lorenzo Lotto. They are characterized by a polychrome effect rendered through the use of different wood types.

The right transepts has Giottesque frescoes from an unknown artist, with Histories of St Aegidius, The Last Supper and the Tree of Life (1347), partially covered by a 17th-century fresco.
