= Alexander of Rome =

3rd-century saint

Saint Alexander of Rome
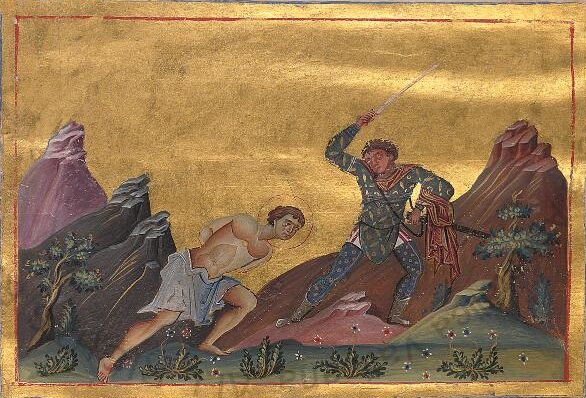
- Martyrdom of Alexander

Martyr
- Died: 289 AD; Karasura
- Venerated in: Roman Catholic Church; Eastern Orthodox Church
- Feast: Catholic Church: March 27; Eastern Orthodox Church: May 26

Alexander of Rome (died 289) is a Christian martyr. The date of his birth is unknown. He died in 289 AD and his mother Pimenia buried him near the river Ergina. His mother was a witness of his martyrdom. Alexander was a Roman soldier and he was serving in the regiment of the tribune Tiberian at Rome. During this period, the Roman emperor Maximian Hercules issued an edict by which all citizens were required to go to the temple of Jupiter to offer sacrifice. Alexander refused to follow this order because of his strong Christian faith. As a result of that, Maximian sent Alexander to Thrace, but Alexander died on the way to this Roman province in 289 AD.

== Feast ==
The Eastern Orthodox Church celebrates him on May 26, except for Romania and Armenian, both of which celebrate him on February 25. In the Macedonian village of Belica near Kičevo, there is a church dedicated to this martyr, the only one dedicated to him in the country. On the archaeological site of the same name, there are some indications that there is the grave of St. Alexander.
