= Di Sangro family =

Italian noble family

Di Sangro
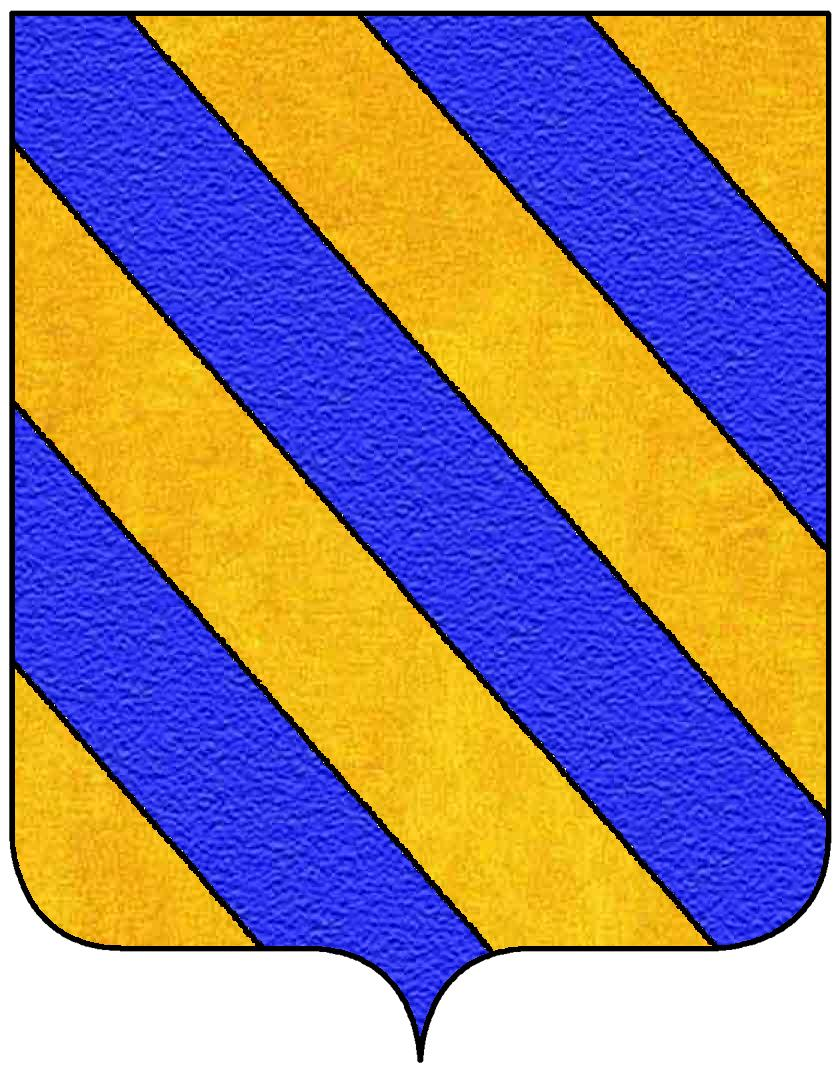
- Coat of arms
- Parent family: Counts of Marsi
- Current region: Italy
- Founded: 1093; 933 years ago
- Founder: Oderisio Di Sangro
- Titles: Prince of Oneglia; Prince of Castelfranco; Prince of Chiusano; Prince of Fondi; Prince of Gesualdo; Prince of San Severo; Prince of Striano; Prince of Viggiano; Duke of Campolieto; Duke of Casacalenda; Duke of Celenza; Duke of Martina; Duke of Pomigliano; Duke of Sangro; Duke of Senise; Duke of Solopaca; Duke of Telese; Duke of Torremaggiore; Duke of Vietri; Marquis of Castelnuovo; Marquis of Castelvecchio; Marquis of Genzano; Marquis of Montefalcione; Marquis of San Lucido; Marquis of Santo Stefano; Count of Agnone, Count of Biccari; Count of Brienza; Count of Buccino; Count of Bugnara; Count of Itri; Count of Sangro
- Motto: Unicum militiae fulmen.
- Estates: Castello Angioino di Civitacampomarano; Palazzo di Sangro di Casacalenda, Naples; Palazzo di Sangro di Sansevero, Naples

The Di Sangro family (or De Sangro) is an Italian noble family.

== Origins ==
The Di Sangro family descends from an Oderisio, who was nephew of Berardo "il Francisco", founder of the Berardi family, known as Counts of Marsi, who inherited the fief of Sangro from his father Rainaldo (today's Castel di Sangro), located near the homonymous river, becoming the 1st count in 1093 and, thanks to the Lombard law of the time that allowed to change one's surname with the name of the fief owned, changed its surname to Di Sangro.

== History ==
Exponents of the family held both state and ecclesiastical positions; among those who received the ecclesiastical ones we remember an Odorisio, who was cardinal of Montecassino, a Gregorio and a Gentile, also cardinals, a Consalvo and an Alfonso, bishops, and an Alessandro, Patriarch of Alexandria and archbishop of Benevento; among the state offices belonged to the family twelve councilors of state, eight courtiers, two executioners, four generals, five field teachers and two general commissioners of the army. The family was also added to the Seggio di Nilo dei Sedili di Napoli.

The Di Sangro family owned a total of six principalities, eleven duchies, six marquisates, nine counties and 180 fiefdoms.

Currently there are descendant genealogical lines of Casacalenda, Castel di Sangro, Fondi and San Severo.

== Notable members ==
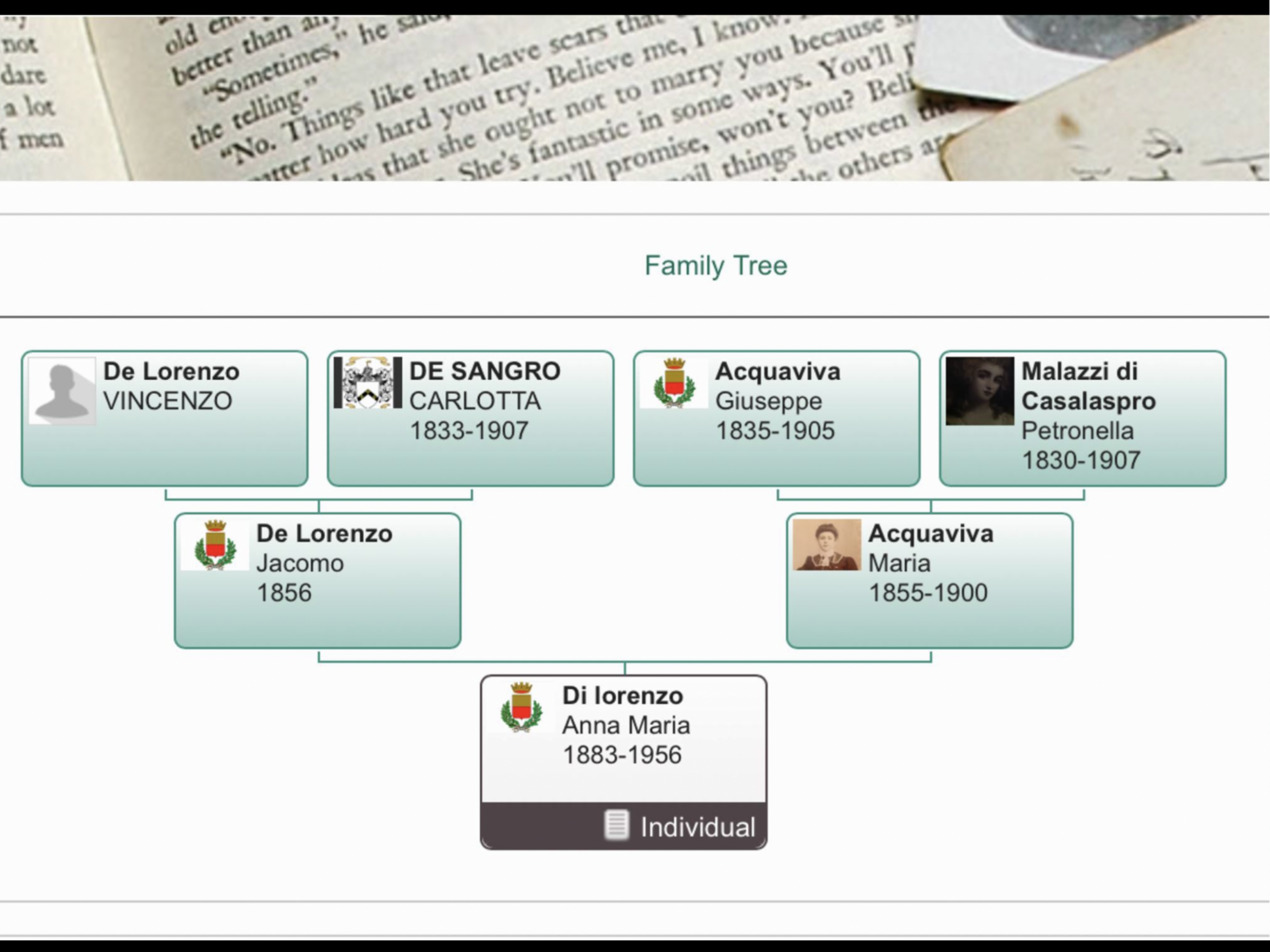
The Di Sangro family descendants

- Raimondo di Sangro (1710–1771), prince of San Severo, a man of multiple interests, whose name is linked to the Cappella Sansevero, which he designed and commissioned.
