= Schiaffino =

Schiaffino is an Italian surname. Notable people with the surname include:

- Bernardo Schiaffino (1678–1725), Italian Baroque sculptor
- David Schiaffino (1913–2005), Argentine sport shooter
- Eduardo Schiaffino (1858–1935), Argentine painter, critic, intellectual and historian
- Francesco Maria Schiaffino (1688–1763), Italian Baroque sculptor
- Juan Alberto Schiaffino (1925–2002), Italian-Uruguayan footballer
- Placido Maria Schiaffino (1829–1889), Italian cardinal
- Raúl Schiaffino (born 1923, date of death unknown), Uruguayan footballer
- Rosanna Schiaffino (1939–2009), Italian actress
- Sergio Schiaffino (born 1992), Mexican professional gridiron football defensive

== See also ==
- Italian destroyer Simone Schiaffino
