= Anatomical Machines =

18th-century anatomical models

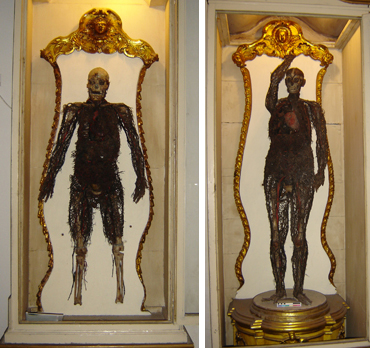
The Anatomical Machines

The Anatomical Machines (Italian: macchine anatomiche) are a pair of anatomical models reproducing the human circulatory system, displayed in the Cappella Sansevero in Naples. Created in the second half of the 18th century, they are constructed over a male and a female human skeleton. The reproduction of the vessel system is formed of metal wire, wax, and silk, but because of its richness of detail it was for a long time believed to be of natural origin.

== History ==
The models were commissioned by Raimondo di Sangro, prince of Sansevero, and realised by Giuseppe Salerno, an anatomist from Palermo, around 1763. Some legends, disproved by modern studies, account for the direct involvement of the prince in the building process, while in fact he only bought them. A contract, found in the notary archive of Naples, states that di Sangro provided to Salerno metal wire and wax for the work.

They were described in detail for the first time in the Breve Nota (short note), an 18th-century guide to Palazzo di Sangro and its chapel. It also accounts the existence of a third machine, a fetus complete with placenta: it was exposed together with the two other machines up to the 1990s, when it was stolen. The models were firstly located in the so-called appartamento della fenice (phoenix's apartment) in Palazzo di Sangro, where in 1775 they were seen by Marquis de Sade, and they were moved to the chapel only after the death of the prince.

The exceptional details in the reproduction of the vessel system is behind a popular legend, referred in the aforementioned guide and also quoted by Benedetto Croce, saying that the two machines were realised through alchemy experiments done by Sansevero on two servants when still alive, injecting in their body a quicksilver-based compound which would have turned their blood into metal, preserving the circulatory system after death. According to an essay by Sergio Attanasio, professor of history of architecture, the prince was not directly involved in the creation of the two models, but he bought them directly from Salerno after they were complete.

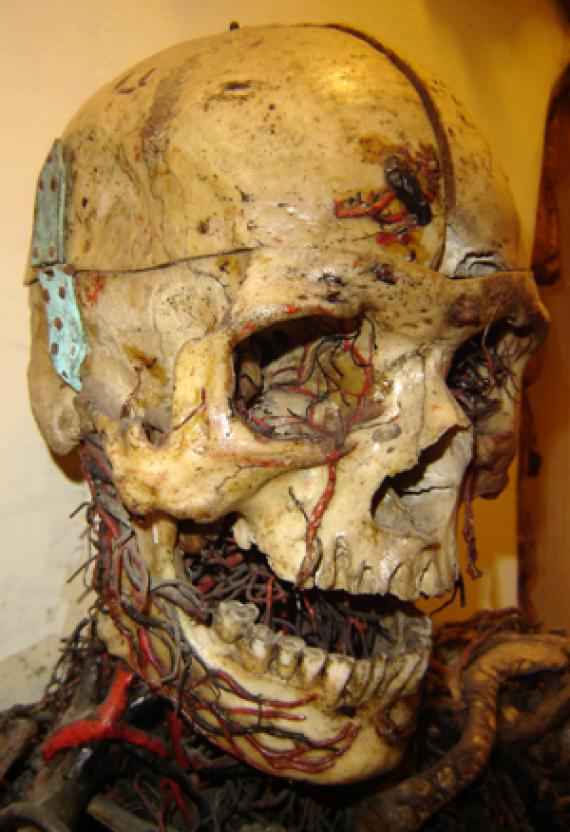
Head of the male model

In 2008 a group of researchers from University College London was authorised from the owners to analyse the models in the chapel. They found that the skeletons are true human ones, while the model of the blood vessels is made with metal wire, coloured wax and silk, using techniques common to anatomical studies of that time, with no evidence in favour of the popular legends. According to their findings, the models contain some mistakes in the reproduction of the circulatory system, referred as not compatible with life. Another analysis conducted in 2014 by a medical team from Ospedale San Gennaro in Naples confirms the authenticity of the two skeletons and the mistakes in the reproduction of the circulatory system, but considered them compatible with life. They also praised the accurate reproduction of the coronary system, despite the lack of knowledge about it at that time.

== Description ==
The two skeletons are located in the cavea sotterranea of the chapel, inside glass showcases. The original location of the female skeleton, on a platform allowing observation from all sides, suggests that the models were intended as curiosity objects as well as models for the study of human anatomy. The two skulls were sawed, and the resulting sections were held together through metal hinges, allowing them to be opened. The pelvis of the female skeleton shows fractures compatible with birth injuries, suggesting that the woman may have died while giving birth to a child. The bones are fixed together with metal wires and nails, and some of them are out of place.

At the woman skeleton's feet was placed a fetus which, according to di Sangro, died together with her mother during birth. It was preserved with exceptional care, complete with placenta and umbilical cord, and it was stolen in the 1990s.

== See also ==
- Cappella Sansevero
- Raimondo di Sangro
