= Antonio Corradini =

Italian sculptor (1688–1752)

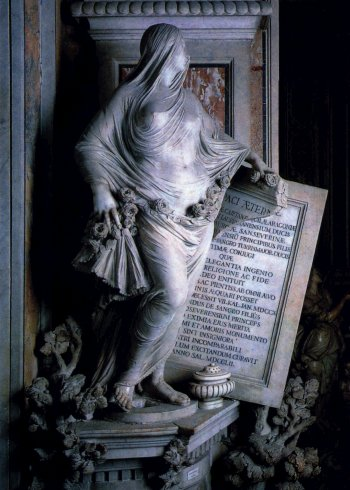
- Corradini's Modesty (1752) at the Cappella Sansevero in Naples, Italy
- Born: October 19, 1688; Venice
- Died: August 12, 1752 (aged 63); Naples
- Known for: Sculpture
- Movement: Rococo

Antonio Corradini (19 October 1688 – 12 August 1752) was an Italian Rococo sculptor from Venice. He is best known for his illusory veiled depictions of the human body, where the contours of the face and body beneath the veil are discernible.

Born in Venice, Corradini spent most of his early career working in his hometown for various patrons in the Venetian Republic, as well as in Dresden and Saint Petersburg. Later, in the 1730s, he spent a decade in Vienna where he was court sculptor for Charles VI, Holy Roman Emperor. In the 1740s he moved first to Rome and later to Naples, where he died.

== Biography ==
=== Early life ===
Corradini was the son of Gerolamo Corradini, a professional veler (packer of sails for ships), and his wife Barbara, and born in the parish of SS. Vito and Modesto in Venice. His family was modest.

Corradini was apprenticed to the sculptor Antonio Tarsia (1663 – c. 1739), for whom he worked probably for four or five years starting at the age of fourteen or fifteen (this was the norm at the time). He later became Tarsia's son-in-law.

=== Early career ===
Corradini seems to have come into his own as a sculptor around 1709. That year he was employed on work for the façade of the church of San Stae in Venice. Two years later, in 1711, he was recorded as having been enrolled in the Arte dei tagliapietra as one of the sculptors. By 1713, he had finally set up his own workshop and was working on the statue of St. Anastasia for the church of San Donato in Zara.

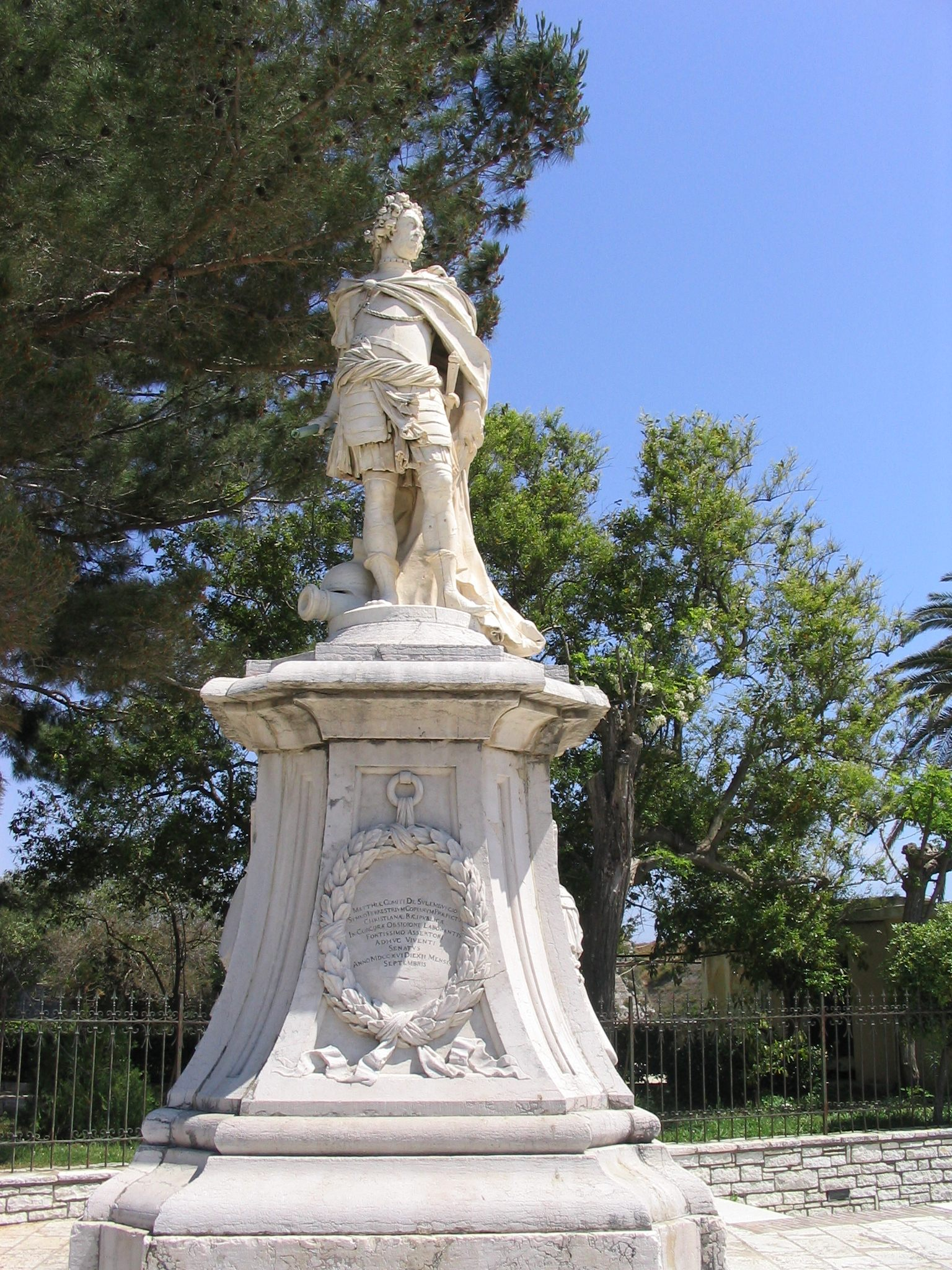
Monument to Johann Matthias Graf von der Schulenburg, Marshall of the Venetian forces, for the island of Corfu

Corradini's commissions for the next several years came from patrons all over Europe. In 1716–17, he completed eighteen busts and two statues for the summer garden of the Russian emperor Peter the Great in St. Petersburg, and the first of his famous veiled women; he would complete two more in the city in 1722. In 1716 he was commissioned to execute a monument to Johann Matthias von der Schulenburg, Marshal of the Venetian forces for the defence of island of Corfu. In 1720 he was paid for a signed altar dedicated to the Blessed Hemma, installed in the crypt of the cathedral in Gurk, Austria. Corradini completed the outdoor marble statuary group Nessus and Deianira in 1716 for a patron in Venice but a few years later, it was bought for the Grosser Garten in Dresden. The Apollo Flaying Marsyas and Zephyrus and Flora (1723–1728) are two life-sized marble sculptures originally commissioned by the King of Poland and Elector of Saxony, Augustus the Strong for the gardens of the Höllandisches Palais in Dresden (now in the Victoria and Albert Museum, London). It was also at this time that Corradini married Maria Tarsia.

In 1723, Corradini reputedly became the first person to legally separate the art of sculptors from the profession of stonemasons, forming part of a college that was established in 1724. He was faced with the task of guiding the new artistic profession through its infancy. In 1725–1726, he was appointed curator of the laws of the institution and became its prior in 1727.

From the mid-1710s onwards, Corradini was awarded a number of commissions in Italy. He completed two statues for the Manin monument in the Cathedral of Udine (1716) and further two for the church of San Giacomo di Udine. The altar of the Blessed Sacrament in the cathedral of Este is a work of 1722–1725. From 1724 to 1728, he worked in Venice on the restoration of the stairway and the sculptures of the Doge's Palace and the facade of the clock tower in the Piazza San Marco. After his wax model was chosen by the Signoria, between 1719 and 1729 Corradini supervised the reconstruction of the bucintoro and completed a few wood carvings for it.

=== Vienna ===
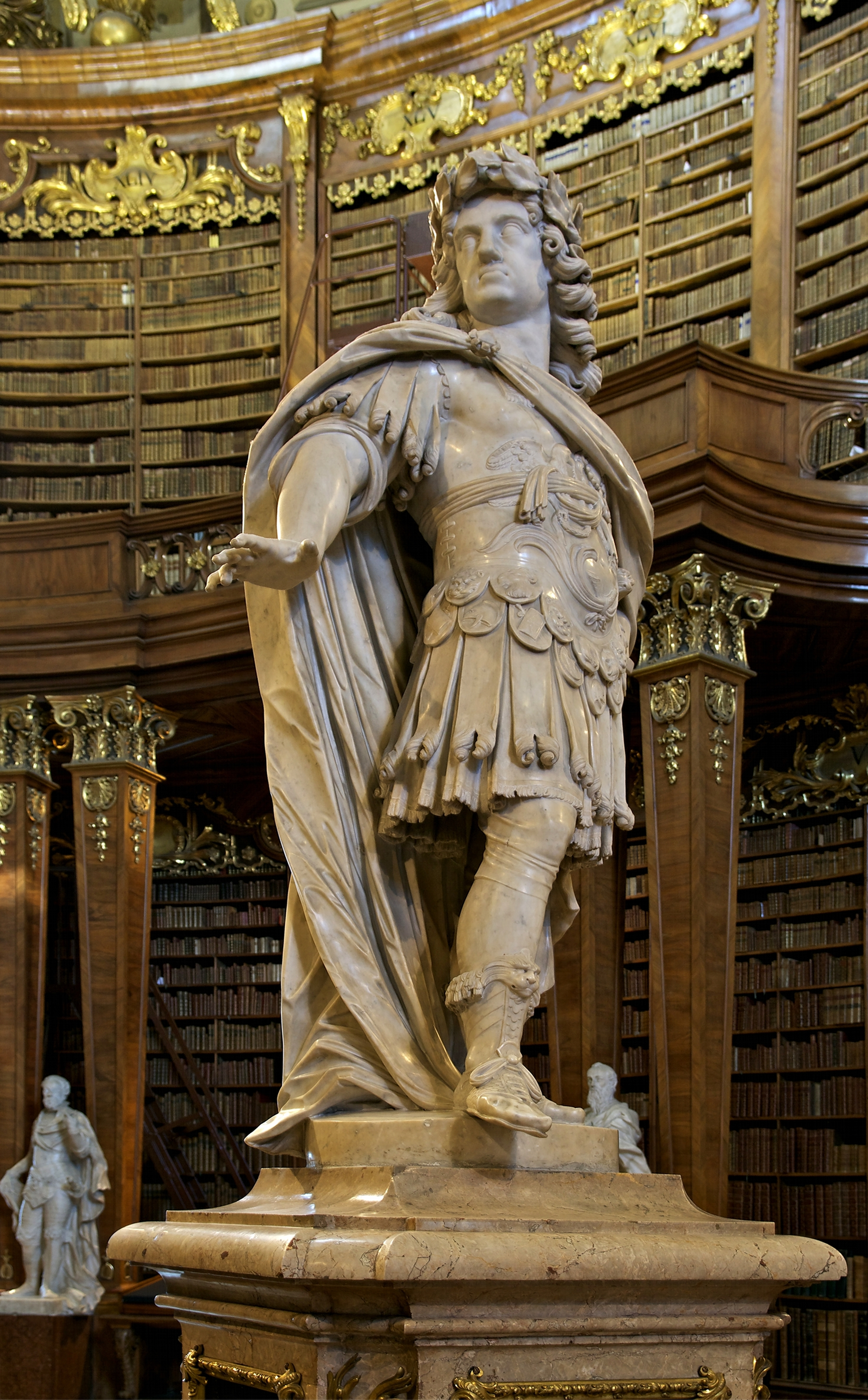
Emperor Charles VI as "Hercules Musarum" (1735) in the Austrian National Library

In 1729–1730, Corradini moved to Vienna, the capital of the Austrian Empire of the Habsburgs, where he was named court sculptor in 1733 and awarded a salary of 1700 florins a year and a housing allowance of 500 florins. He would be based there through the early 1740s. Emperor Charles VI entrusted him with the realization of the Bundesladendenkmal, or monument of the Ark of the Covenant, in Győr, in what is now northwestern Hungary, and in 1735 he worked after a drawing of Joseph Emanuel Fischer von Erlach on a modelleto for tomb of St. Johann Nepomuk in Prague, executed by the silversmith Johann Joseph Würth in St. Vitus Cathedral of the Prague Castle.

Corradini completed a large number of works in Vienna itself during these years. Charles VI employed him in the decoration of the Josephbrunnen and, later, Corradini sculpted four figures for the two side altars below the dome of the Karlskirche and designed and supervised the construction of a wooden theater for animal fights called the Hetztheater. In 1736, together with Antonio Galli Bibbiena, he was named court designer for the bullfights that were held there, and on 14 April 1738 an imperial decree appointed Galli Bibbiena, Corradini, and Antonio Lopez jointly to the post of managers of the theater, which was used until 1749.

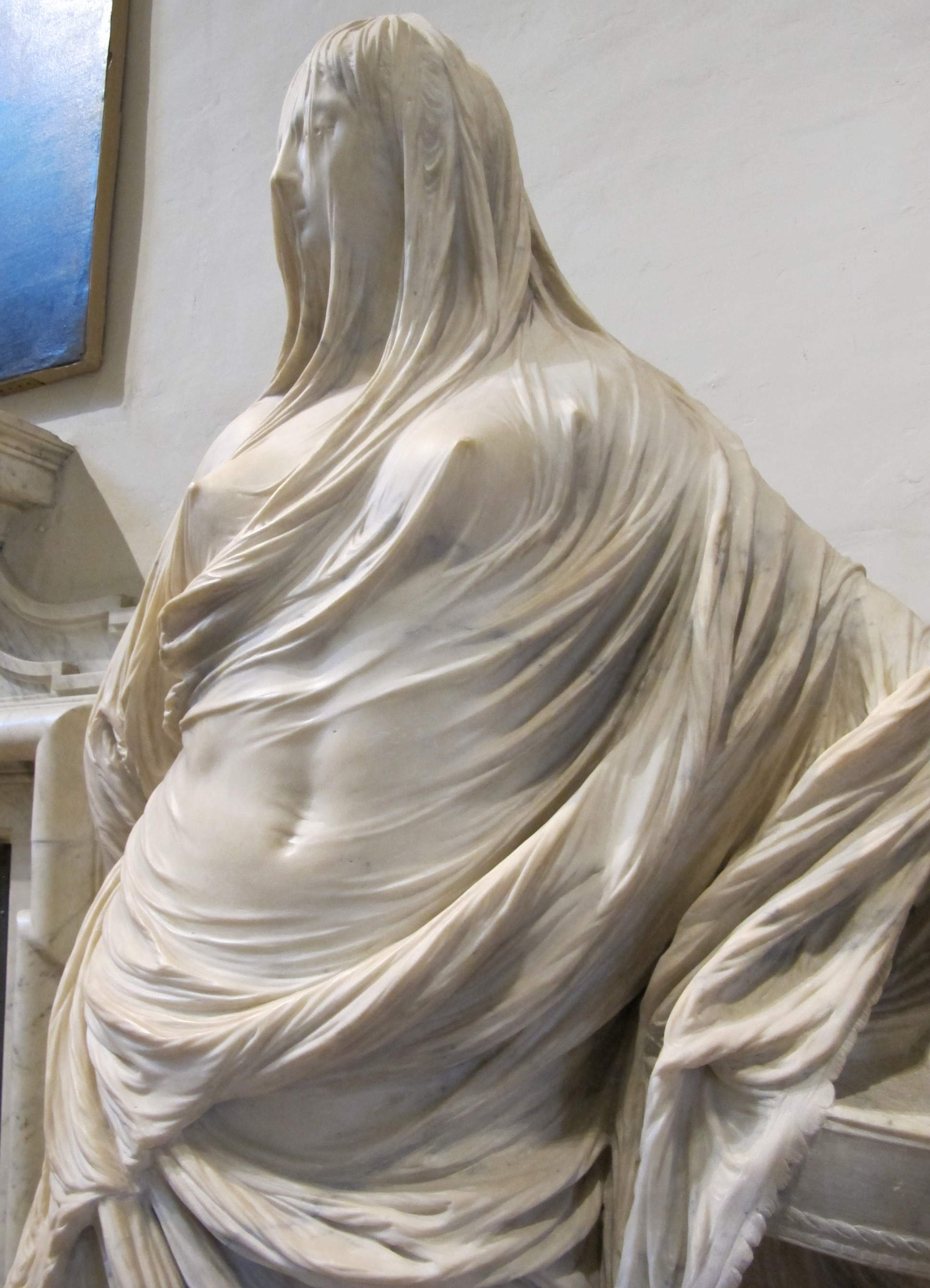
Detail of The Vestal Virgin Tuccia (1743) in the Palazzo Barberini, Rome

=== Rome ===
On the death of Emperor Charles VI in 1740 and his wife in 1741, and the death of Fischer von Erlach in 1742, Georg Raphael Donner became the most prominent sculptor in Vienna. Corradini entered a period of crisis. In 1740 he briefly visited Rome, then in late 1742 he returned first to Venice and then to Rome, where shared room and board with Giovanni Battista Piranesi, even though Empress Maria Theresa reconfirmed him as court sculptor. On 23 January 1743 Corradini asked permission to stay in Rome permanently with the option of returning to Vienna.

In Rome, he devoted himself to sculpting the Vestal Virgin Tuccia, achieved without a commission from any patron (it remained unsold), and was involved in the problem of the restoration of the dome of St. Peter's Basilica. Corradini designed eight models of colossal statues with which it was proposed to place at the foot of the drum of the dome make it more resistant. He also sculpted a bust of Pope Benedict XIV and other minor works.

=== Naples ===
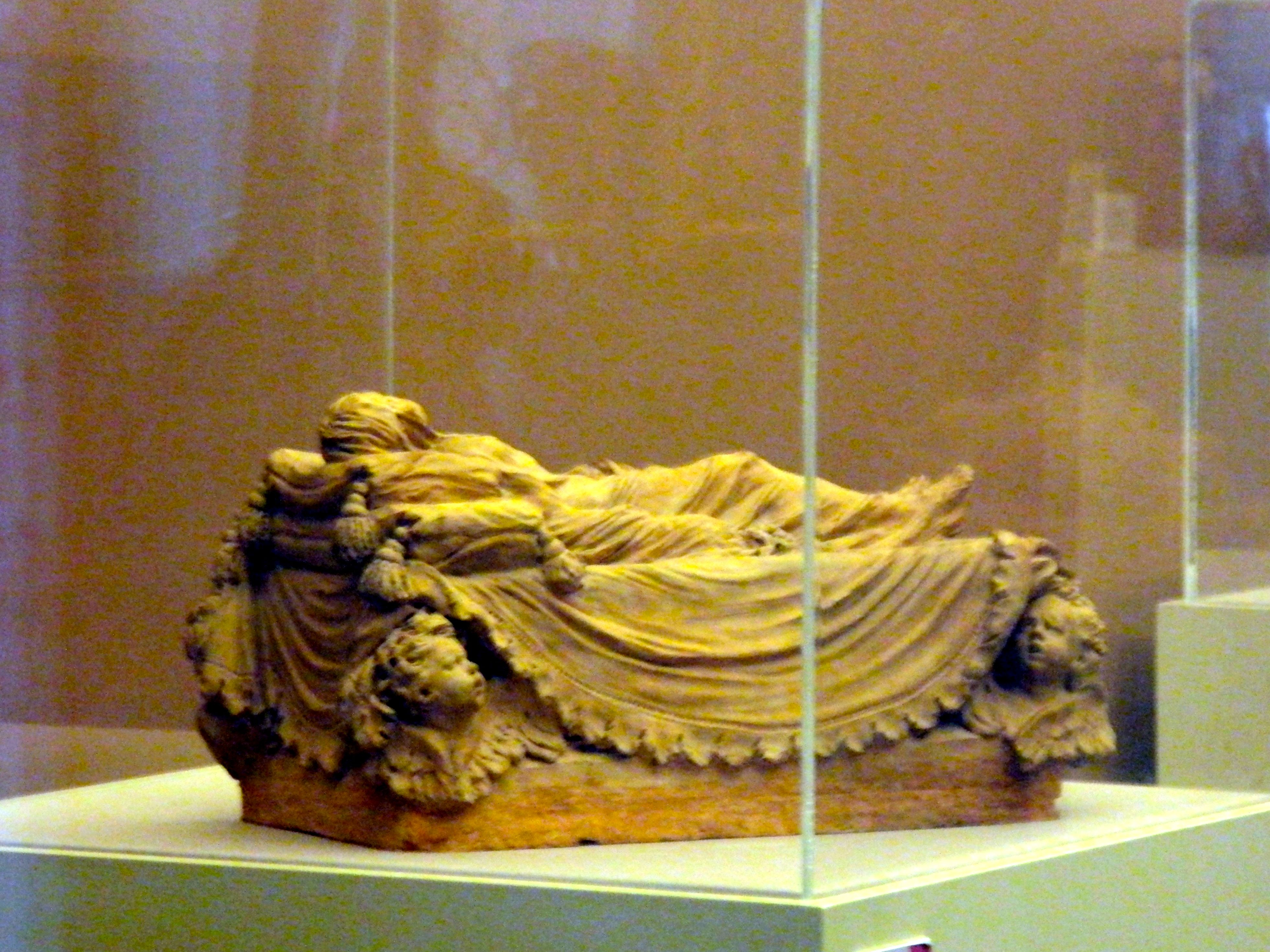
Corradini's Veiled Christ terracotta bozzetto in the Certosa di San Martino. Corradini died before the full statue could be started, and Giuseppe Sammartino's completed marble is exhibited in the Cappella Sansevero in Naples.

In 1744 Corradini moved to Naples to oversee the sculptural renovation of the Sansevero Chapel (Capella Sansevero de' Sangri or Pietatella) at the request of Raimondo di Sangro, Prince of Sansevero VII. Corradini's work on the chapel is a very complex and intricate decoration of statues, pedestals, altar frontals, round and bas-reliefs, for which he prepared 36 bozzetti in clay.

In 1750, he completed Veiled Truth (also called Modesty or Chastity), a tomb monument dedicated to Cecilia Gaetani dell'Aquila d'Aragona, mother of Raimondo di Sangro. Not only is it a technically inspired work, but the conceit of modesty shielded by the flimsiest of veils creates an alluring but ironic tension, perhaps one somewhat unmerited for a chapel funerary monument, but one that does compel remembrance.

Corradini died suddenly on 12 August 1752 in Naples. He was buried there in the parish church of Santa Maria della Rotonda on the same day. Because the work in Sansevero Chapel was incomplete, Raimondo di Sangro commissioned Francesco Queirolo to oversee the remaining work based on Corradini's bozzetti. Starting from a bozzetto by Corradini that is now preserved in the Certosa di San Martino, another artist working on the project Giuseppe Sanmartino sculpted the Veiled Christ using the same artifice of "veiled" marble.
