= Carlo Amalfi =

Italian painter

Carlo Amalfi or Aniello (1707– 1787) was an Italian painter, active in the Kingdom of Naples as mainly a portrait artist.

== Biography ==
Carlo was born in Piano di Sorrento or Vico Equense. Among his most prominent portraits is that of Prince Raimondo di Sangro, located in the Cappella Sansevero of Naples.

Other works by Amalfi can be seen in churches in Nocera, and in the grand council hall of Castel Capuano in Naples, where he worked in 1752 alongside the quadrature painter Giovanni Battista Natali. He also painted some genre works in the style of Gaspare Traversi.
