= Castello marchesale =

Castle in Palmoli, Italy

Coordinates: 41.9388°N 14.5810°E

Marquis Castle
- Castello marchesale
- Palmoli
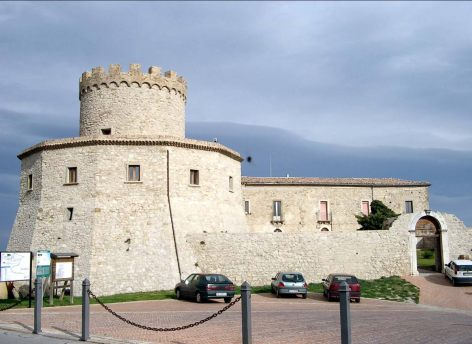
- Castle in Vasto

Site information
- Type: Castle

Location

Site history
- Built: 15th century

Castello marchesale (Italian for Marquis Castle) is a Renaissance castle in Palmoli, Province of Chieti (Abruzzo).

== History ==
The castle was built by the Pandulfo-Di Sangro family, the Counts of Monteodorisio, in 1095, while the marquis' palace dates back to the 15th century, and the chapel of San Carlo was built in 1772 by the Marquis Severino di Gagliati. Recent archaeological excavations have uncovered remains of glazed ceramics from the 11th century, found mostly in the gap between the old circular tower and the polygonal tower.

== Architecture ==
The castle is located in the northern district of the town called Le Coste, defending the Treste river. The manor consists of a dodecagonal tower, possibly from the 16th century, which has incorporated a circular tower, the Severino-Longo palace, and the church of San Carlo Borromeo. Until the early 20th century, there was also a tower known as the "Torrione" with vertical walls lacking a batter. An internal garden within the castle is equipped with casemates for the defense of the marquis' palace. The predominant material used for construction is local limestone, sometimes well squared (in the cornerstones or in the arches). For the cornices, brickwork (bricks and tiles arranged in rows and protruding on the facade) is used. The balconies are made of more compact limestone known as Istrian stone. Scattered around, architectural elements in gray-green sandstone can be admired, as seen in the marquis' palace. Investigations have uncovered urban walls and a brick water conduit adjacent to the batter of the south side of the polygonal tower.
