= Johann Joseph Würth =

Austrian silversmith of the late baroque period

Johann Joseph Würth, also known as Jan Josef Würth (2 April 1706, in Vienna – 30 September 1767, in Vienna) was an Austrian silversmith of the late baroque period. He is best known for the silver tomb with statues on the grave of John of Nepomuk in Prague.

== Life ==
Coming from a famous family of silversmiths, he was able to enter the Viennese guild of goldsmiths, silversmiths and jewellers as a master in 1726, without practice. He worked above all on ecclesiastic silver, such as monstrances, chalices or mass trays, often decorated with precious stones. His master work was the silver tomb with statues on the grave of Saint John of Nepomuk in St. Vitus Cathedral in Prague Castle. He hammered out the silver using wooden models by Italian sculptor Antonio Corradini. It took him two years (1735 - 1736), his helpers were Georg Rafael Donner and Kašpar Gschwandtner. The three all worked together in Prague on the tomb, because moving such a large work in wood would be too expensive. The resulting piece on St John's grave is the largest ecclesiastic silverwork in Central Europe that surviving the Napoleonic Wars. Later he worked for the pilgrimage church of the Virgin Mary in Mariazell, Styria, and erected there a silver altar, and bulkhead with grille. Between 1751 - 1754 he was elected the first chairman of the Viennese guild and later senior guild master.

== Work ==
- Silver tomb with statues upon the grave of John of Nepomuk in Prague, (1735-1736)
- Sun monstrance for the St. Stephan cathedral in Vienna (1751), now in the Cathedral and Diocesan Museum in Vienna,
- Silver altar in the church of Mariazell in Austria.

== Literature ==
- Waltraud NEUWIRTH: Wiener Silber Punzierung 1524 - 1780. Vienna 2004, pp. 300–301.
