= Palmoli =

- Comune
- Comune di Palmoli
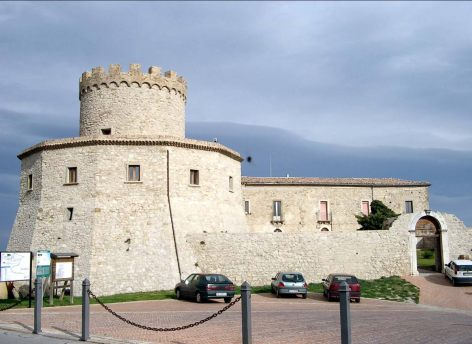
- The tower

- Location within Italy Location within Abruzzo
- Coordinates: 41°56′22″N 14°34′53″E
- Country: Italy
- Region: Abruzzo
- Province: Chieti (CH)
- Frazioni: Cannavela, Fonte la Casa, Immerse, Melania, Pezzo Grosso, Santo Ianni

Government
  - Mayor: Giuseppe Rosario Masciulli

Area
  - Total: 32.78 km^{2} (12.66 sq mi)
- Elevation: 711 m (2,333 ft)

Population (31 December 2017)
  - Total: 922
  - Density: 28.1/km^{2} (72.8/sq mi)
- Demonym: Palmolesi
- Time zone: UTC+1 (CET)
  - Summer (DST): UTC+2 (CEST)
- Postal code: 66050
- Dialing code: 0873
- Patron saint: San Valentino
- Saint day: 14 February
- Website: Official website

Palmoli (Abruzzese: Pàlmërë) is a comune and town in the province of Chieti, Abruzzo, south-eastern Italy.

== Climate ==
Climate data for Palmoli, elevation 650 m (2,130 ft), (1951–2000)
Month	Jan	Feb	Mar	Apr	May	Jun	Jul	Aug	Sep	Oct	Nov	Dec	Year
Record high °C (°F)	17.9 (64.2)	20.7 (69.3)	24.0 (75.2)	27.5 (81.5)	32.0 (89.6)	40.0 (104.0)	39.0 (102.2)	38.8 (101.8)	34.3 (93.7)	29.1 (84.4)	25.3 (77.5)	19.5 (67.1)	40.0 (104.0)
Mean daily maximum °C (°F)	6.9 (44.4)	7.7 (45.9)	10.3 (50.5)	14.6 (58.3)	19.6 (67.3)	23.9 (75.0)	27.1 (80.8)	27.1 (80.8)	23.1 (73.6)	17.1 (62.8)	11.7 (53.1)	8.4 (47.1)	16.5 (61.6)
Daily mean °C (°F)	4.1 (39.4)	4.6 (40.3)	6.8 (44.2)	10.5 (50.9)	15.2 (59.4)	19.2 (66.6)	22.2 (72.0)	22.2 (72.0)	18.6 (65.5)	13.5 (56.3)	8.7 (47.7)	5.7 (42.3)	12.6 (54.7)
Mean daily minimum °C (°F)	1.4 (34.5)	1.4 (34.5)	3.3 (37.9)	6.4 (43.5)	10.8 (51.4)	14.5 (58.1)	17.2 (63.0)	17.2 (63.0)	14.1 (57.4)	9.9 (49.8)	5.7 (42.3)	3.0 (37.4)	8.7 (47.7)
Record low °C (°F)	−13.0 (8.6)	−10.4 (13.3)	−11.7 (10.9)	−4.8 (23.4)	1.5 (34.7)	5.9 (42.6)	8.3 (46.9)	6.6 (43.9)	1.8 (35.2)	−1.5 (29.3)	−4.9 (23.2)	−8.7 (16.3)	−13.0 (8.6)
Average precipitation mm (inches)	67.6 (2.66)	51.0 (2.01)	63.2 (2.49)	63.1 (2.48)	50.8 (2.00)	46.0 (1.81)	35.7 (1.41)	42.2 (1.66)	60.3 (2.37)	74.3 (2.93)	89.3 (3.52)	71.3 (2.81)	714.8 (28.15)
Average precipitation days	8.0	7.4	8.6	7.4	7.0	6.0	4.1	4.8	5.9	7.9	9.2	8.7	85
Source: Regione Abruzzo

== See also ==
- Castello marchesale
