= Roman Catholic Diocese of Fiorentino =

Former Roman Catholic diocese in Apulia, Italy (1059–1391)

The Roman Catholic Diocese of Fiorentino (Latin: Florentinum), named after its see (Castel) Fiorentino (di Puglia), was a medieval Latin Rite bishopric (1059–1391). It was located about four miles southwest of the present 'commune' (municipality) of Torremaggiore. The name has been restored as a titular see.

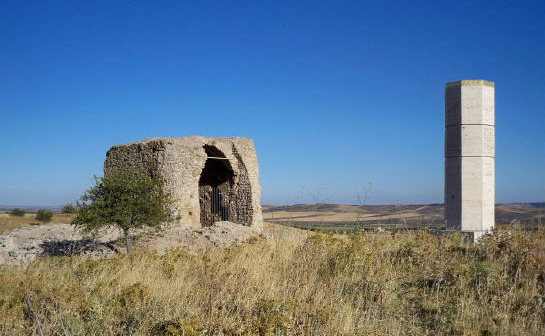
Castel Fiorentino: the Hohenstaufen castle

== History ==
The fortress of Castel Fiorentino, like Troia, Montecorvino, Civitate, Lesina, and Draconara in the Capitanata area, was probably erected not long after his victory over the Apulians in 1018, by the Italian catapan (Byzantine governor) Basilio Boioannes, as a Byzantine ring opposing the expansionist Lombard duchy of Benevento.

The diocese of Fiorentino started as a suffragan of the Patriarchate of Constantinople, using its Greek rite, until Rome's Latin rite was introduced by the conquering Normans mid eleventh century.

On 12 July 1053, Pope Leo IX issued the bull "Cum Summae Apostolicae", in which he confirmed the privileges and possessions of the Church of Benevento for Archbishop Voldaricus. The list of properties did not include Fiorentino.

On 22 January 1055, Pope Victor II transferred those dioceses of the ex-Byzantine capitanate to the Metropolitan Archdiocese of Benevento by papal bulla.

In a bull, "Cum Summae Apostolicae", on 24 January 1058, Pope Stephen IX confirmed for Archbishop Vodalricus of Benevento the privileges and properties granted to the Church of Benevento by Pope Leo IX. These included some which had not appeared in the bull of Leo IX, including Florentino.

The bishop of Fiorentino, whose personal name is unmentioned, was present at the consecration of the church at Montecassino by Pope Alexander III on 1 October 1171.

On 13 December 1250, the Holy Roman Emperor Frederick II died at Fiorentino. In 1224, he had made Fiorentino a civitas of his demesne, and ordered the construction of a castle and a residence for the emperor. The "domus" of Fiorenza is listed in the "Statuum de reparatione castrorum" (c. 1241–1245). In the summer of 1255, Pope Alexander IV sent a papal army against the supporters of Frederick's son Manfred in Apulia and the Capitanata. Gathered at Canosa, they set off on 26 September, following the via di Capitinata, and raviging along the way both Dragonara and Fiorentino, and killing every Saracen they met. The expedition climaxed with an assault on Nocera (Lucera).

Its archeological site comprises a cathedral and one more of a dozen documented churches, including Santa Maria, San Cristoforo, San Giorgio and San Lorenzo, which had an archpriest; San Nicola, Santa Maria, San Donnino and Santissima Trinità, depending on the abbey of Torremaggiore; San Nicola and San Pietro; Santa Maria Coronata, which bishop Ramfredo conceded in 1205 to San Leonardo di Siponto; and San Leone, depending on the extramural monastery San Salvatore.

From the 14th century, according to a 1313 Angevin chancellery document, the city was progressively abandoned, like other cities of the Capitanata, due to unhealthiness, tax burdens, and spoliation. The bishopric was suppressed after bishop Meglio's death in 1410. Its territory was merged into the Diocese of Lucera.

=== Bishops ===
...

- Landolfo (attested 1061, 1062)
- Robertus (I) (prima del 1071- dopo il 1087)

...

- Robertus (II) (attested 1179 – )
- ?Robertus (III) (attested 1197)
- Ramfredus (documentato dal 1205 – 1224)
- [Anonymous] (16 ottobre 1236 - ?)
- Ruggero (I) (documentato nel 1238 – 1239)
- Anonimo (attested 1252 – 1254)
- Guglielmo (attested 1304)
- Giacomo (1321 - ?)
- Anonimo (attested 1331)
- Ruggero II (? - circa 1344)
- Matthaeus, O.S.B. (23 June 1344 - ?)
- Simeone ( ? )
- Elias (4 dicembre 1374 - ?)
- Giovanni (2 febbraio 1389 - ?) Avignon Obedience
- Melius (22 June 1391 - death 1410) Roman Obedience

== Titular see ==
The title of Bishop of Fiorentino, though not the diocese itself, was restored in 1968, to be used as a titular bishopric. It has had the following incumbents:

- Luigi Barbarito (1969 – 2017)
- Francisco Cota de Oliveira (2017 – 2020)

== See also ==
- List of Catholic dioceses in Italy

== Bibliography ==
- Beck, P. (1989). "Archeologia di un complesso castrale: Fiorentino in Capitanata," (in Italian), in: Archeologia medievale 16 (1989), pp. 137–154; Id.,
- Beck, P. (1995). "La domus imperiale di Fiorentino in Capitanata," (in Italian), in: M.S.Calò Mariani e R.Cassano (edd.), Federico II.Immagine e potere: Catalogo della Mostra (Bari, Castello Svevo, 4 febbraio-14 maggio 1995) (Venezia, 1995), pp 183–185.
- Cappelletti, Giuseppe (1864). Le chiese d'Italia: dalla loro origine sino ai nostri giorni (in Italian). Vol. Tomo decimonono (19). Venice: G. Antonelli. pp. 276–278.
- Cardillo, Luigi (1885). Dizionario corografico-storico-statistico della Capitanata e de' luoghi più notevoli dell'antica Daunia. (in Italian). Altamura: F. Leggieri 1885, pp. 46–48.
- Eubel, Conradus, ed. (1913). Hierarchia catholica, Tomus 1 (second ed.). Münster: Libreria Regensbergiana. (in Latin)
- Eubel, Conradus, ed. (1914). Hierarchia catholica, Tomus 2 (second ed.). Münster: Libreria Regensbergiana.
- Gams, Pius Bonifatius (1873). Series episcoporum Ecclesiae catholicae: quotquot innotuerunt a beato Petro apostolo (in Latin). Ratisbon: Typis et Sumptibus Georgii Josephi Manz. p. 892.
- Kehr, Paulus Fridolin (1962). Italia pontificia. Regesta pontificum Romanorum. Vol. IX: Samnia – Apulia – Lucania. Berlin: Weidmann. (in Latin). p. 162.
- Mariani, Maria Stella Calò (2007). "I "villages désertés" della Capitanata. Fiorentino e Montecorvino," in Atti del 27º convegno sulla preistoria-protostoria-storia della Daunia, San Severo 2007, pp. 43–55.
- Mariani, Maria Stella Calò (2012). "La cattedrale di Fiorentino e il territorio. Osservazioni sull’architettura e sulla suppellettile sacra," (in Italian), in: Fiorentino ville désertée, nel contesto della Capitanata medievale (ricerche 1982-1993) Rome: École française de Rome 2012.
- Mariani, Maria Stella Calò (2012b). "La domus di Fiorentino e l’architettura residenziale di età svevo-angioina. Il rapporto con la natura," (in Italian), in: Fiorentino ville désertée, nel contesto della Capitanata medievale (ricerche 1982-1993), Roma: École française de Rome 2012.
- Martin, J.-M.; Noyé, G. (1991). La Capitanata nella storia del Mezzogiorno medievale. (in Italian). Bari 1991.
- Schiraldi, Gaetano (2012). "Rinascimento cristiano in prospettiva umanistica. La diocesi di Lucera nel Quattrocento", (in Italian), in: La Capitanata XLX (2012), pp. 171–185.
- Ughelli, Ferdinando; Coleti, Niccolo (1721). Italia sacra, sive De episcopis Italiae et insularum adjacentium. Vol. Tomus octavus (8). Venice: Apud Sebastianum Coleti. pp. 283–284.

=== External links ===
- Gabriel Chow, GCatholic
- Martin, Jean-Marie (2005). "CASTELFIORENTINO." (in Italian). Federiciana (2005).
