= Hieronymus Löschenkohl =

Austrian copperplate engraver (1753–1807)

Johann Hieronymus Löschenkohl
- Meister Pech als Obrister von der National-Garde. Anti-French caricature by Hieronymus Löschenkohl, 1794, Bibliothèque nationale de France, Paris
- Born: 18 March 1753; Elberfeld, Wuppertal
- Died: 11 January 1807 (aged 53); Vienna, Austrian Empire
- Known for: Engraving
- Movement: Baroque

Johann Hieronymus Löschenkohl (born 18 March 1753 in Elberfeld, now part of Wuppertal, Germany; died 11 January 1807 in Vienna) was a German copperplate engraver active in Vienna in the late 18th century.

== Life and work ==
Löschenkohl arrived in Vienna from Germany in 1780, aged 28, and opened a shop on the Hoher Markt. He began his career by creating silhouette portraits. These striking, relatively inexpensive shadow profiles, almost always in black and white, were highly popular at the time. Through his work, Löschenkohl and his main competitor, the French-born, Vienna-based silhouette artist François Gonord, captured a broad cross-section of Viennese high society, including artists, members of the nobility and wealthy bourgeois citizens. Löschenkohl was particularly successful with his portraits of famous contemporaries such as Joseph Haydn and Wolfgang Amadeus Mozart, with some of his copperplate engravings selling as many as seven thousand copies. Before long, he was able to relocate his business to the Kohlmarkt, one of the city's most prestigious commercial venues.

When the Holy Roman Emperor, Joseph II, relaxed press censorship through his reforms of 1781, it sparked a massive publishing boom known as the Broschürenflut (pamphlet flood). Löschenkohl seized this opportunity, supplying the public with almost daily, hand-colored copper engravings depicting breaking political and social news. His plates depicted scenes of revolutions and wars, aristocratic festivities, sensational crimes and notable events, such as the meeting between Joseph II and Catherine the Great in 1787, the death of Maria Theresa and the Austro-Turkish War. The easing of censorship enabled him to print humorous and highly critical scenes of Viennese society, documenting everything from backroom prostitution in tavern 'snugs' to the latest court scandals. The style of his plates was vivid, at times even stark or graphic. Scenes involving the House of Habsburg, including weddings, baptisms, deaths and domestic and foreign policy, occupied a significant proportion of his work. When necessary, Löschenkohl added a brief text—often ironic and patriotic in tone, especially when the subject involved Austria's adversaries. Following Joseph II's death, such political content became less frequent.

Löschenkohl prints became exceedingly popular with Vienna's middle class. They were sold as individual prints and also adapted for use on items such as fans, boxes and playing cards. Furthermore, Löschenkohl produced calendars, popularised greeting cards in Vienna, sold printed wallpaper and published parlour games. Even if his contemporaries criticised the artistic shortcomings of his work, Löschenkohl's images continue to be displayed in exhibitions and reproduced in books today, serving to illustrate the era of enlightened absolutism under Joseph II.

== Gallery ==
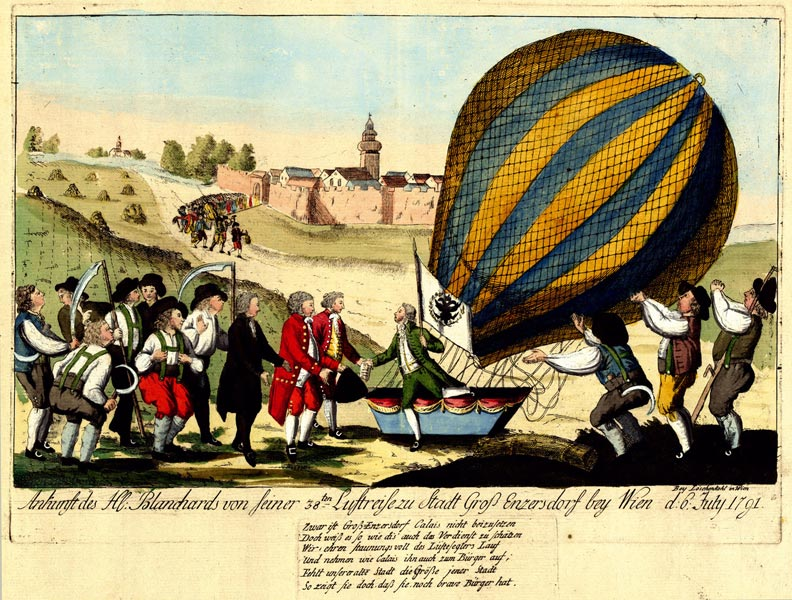
Balloon landing near Vienna (1791)

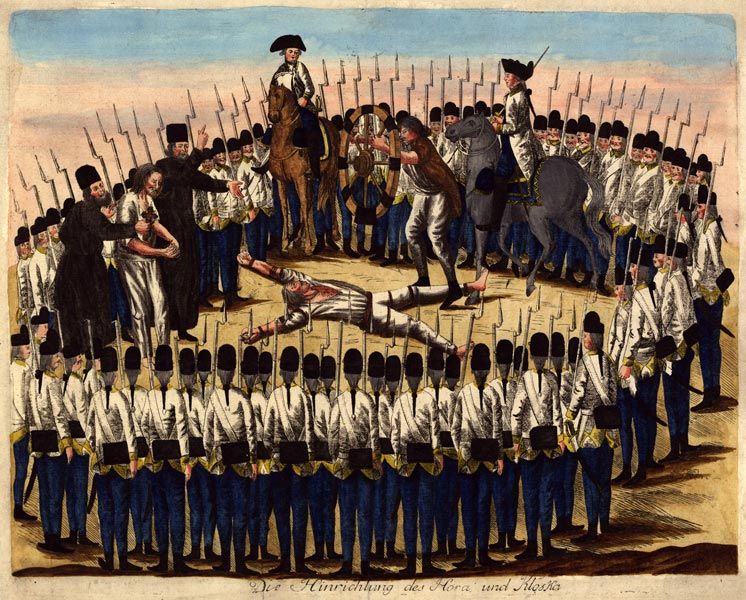
The public execution of the Romanian rebels Horea and Cloșca (1785)

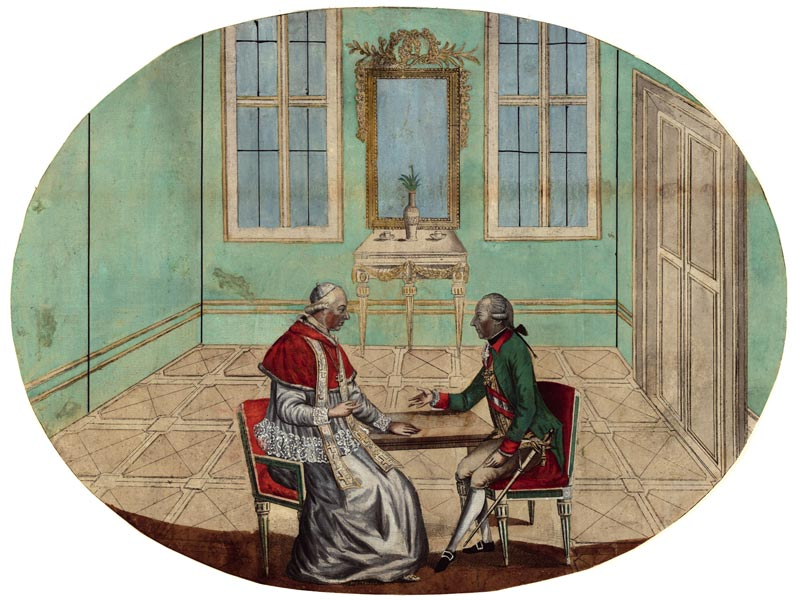
Discussion between Joseph II and Pope Pius VI (1782)

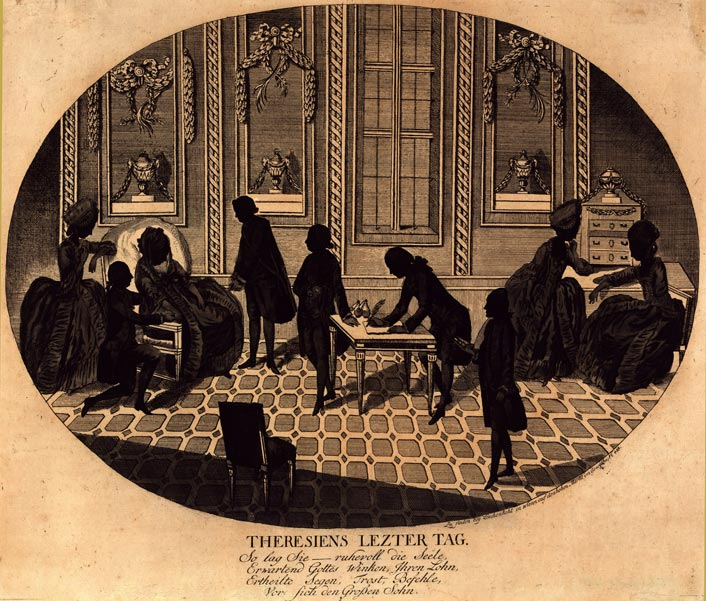
Maria Theresa's Last Day (1781)

The last morning of Joseph II (1790)

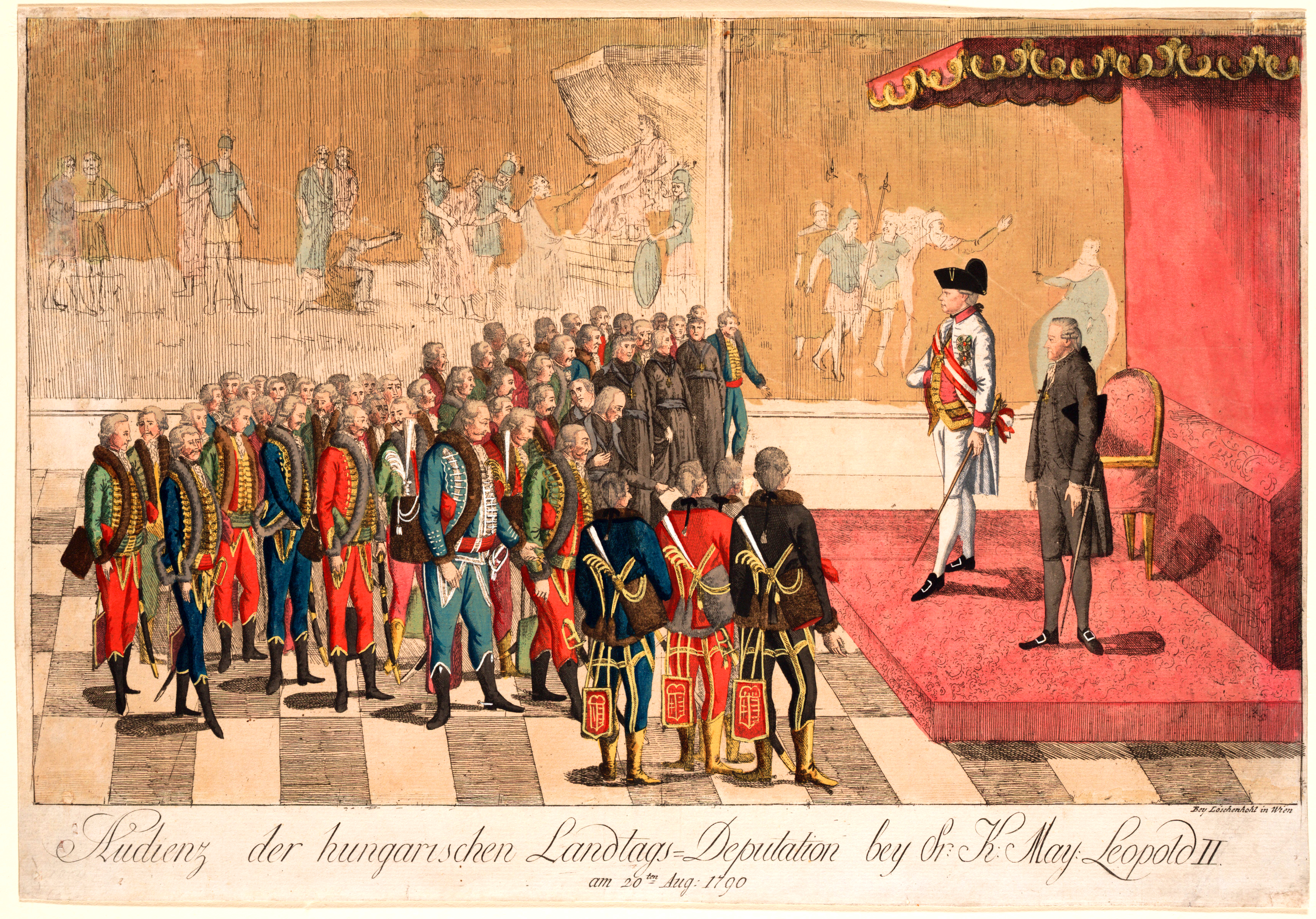
An Hungarian deputation received by Emperor Leopold II (1790)

Der Herr Schneidermeister Coeur als Generalmajor von der National Garde : zieht mit seinen Gesellen zu Felde, anti-French caricature (1794)

Vienna's Hetztheater burning (1796)

== Bibiography ==
- Constantin von Wurzbach: "Löschenkohl, Johann." In: Biographisches Lexikon des Kaiserthums Oesterreich (Biographical Lexicon of the Empire of Austria). Part 15 Kaiserlich-königliche Hof- und Staatsdruckerei, Vienna 1866, p. 400–402 (digitalised).
- Witzmann, Reingard (1978). Hieronymus Löschenkohl. Bildreporter zwischen Barock und Biedermeier. Vienna: Edition Tusch.
- Monika Sommer, ed. (2009). Hieronymus Löschenkohl. Sensationen aus dem Alten Wien. Catalogue of the exhibition of the same name at the Vienna Museum. Vienna: Christian Brandstätter Verlag. ISBN 978-3-85033-315-3.
- Thomas Hubmayer: Hieronymus Löschenkohl im Kontext der Kultur- und Sozialgeschichte des Josephinismus. PhD dissertation, University of Vienna, 2012 (online).
