= Palazzo di Sangro =

Palace in Naples, Italy

Coordinates: 40.848306°N 14.255139°E

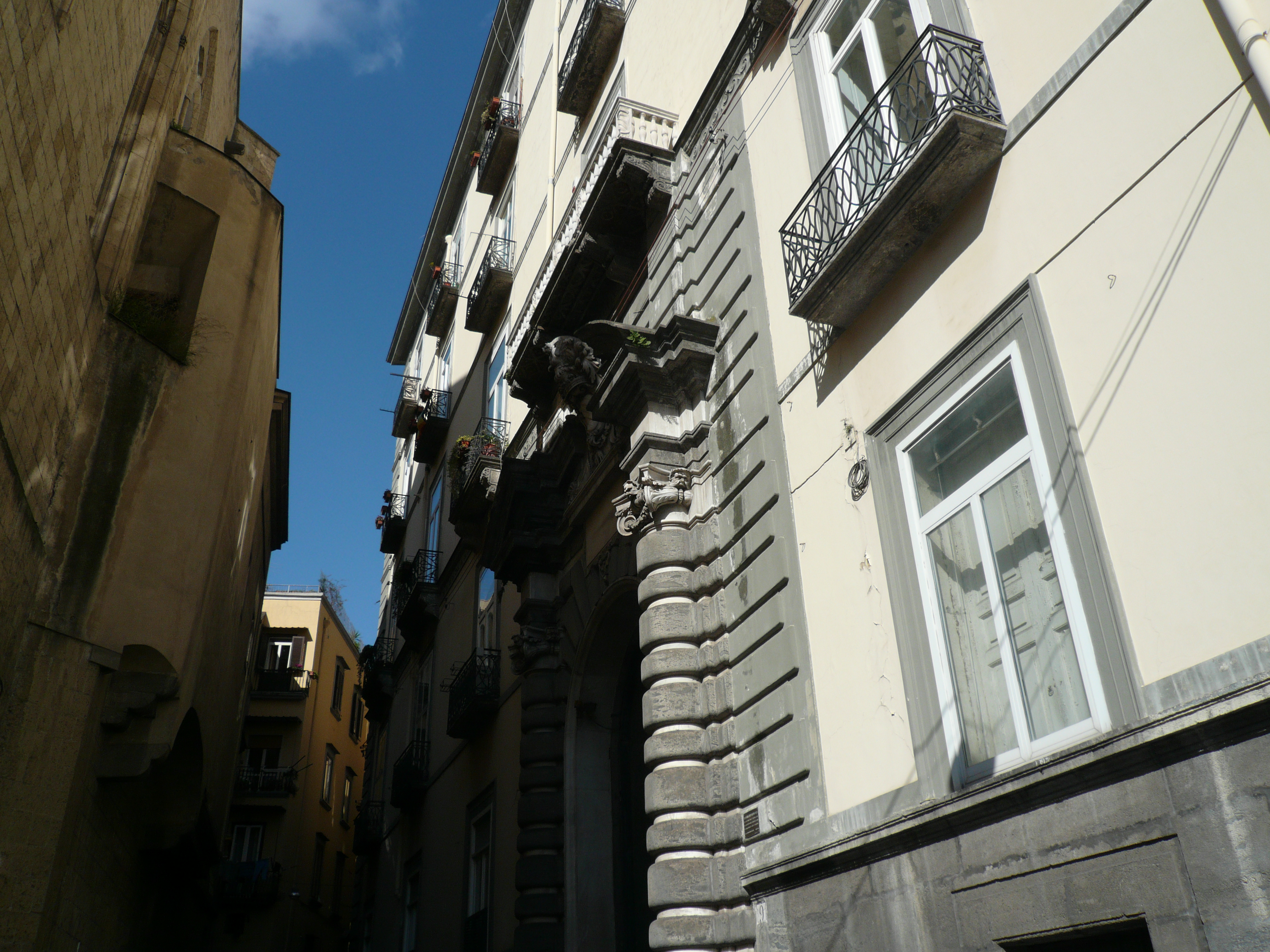

Palazzo di Sangro, also known as either Palazzo de Sangro di Sansevero or Palazzo Sansevero, is a late-Renaissance-style aristocratic palace facing the church of San Domenico Maggiore, separated by the via named after the church, in the city center of Naples, Italy. Part of the palace facade faces the piazza in front of the church, which is also bordered to the south by the Palazzo di Sangro di Casacalenda.

== History ==
A palace at the site was begun by Paolo di Sangro, duke of Torremaggiore in the 16th century as his family residence. It was designed by the sculptor and architect Giovanni da Nola. Around that time it was also resident to the nobleman and composer Carlo Gesualdo - it was here that he murdered his wife. Giovan Francesco Paolo di Sangro, 1st Prince of San Severo, began building a family burial chapel in the palace grounds - it was completed in 1613 by his son Alessandro, patriarch of Alexandria and archbishop of Benevento. Paolo de Sangro, 2nd Prince of San Severo, rebuilt the palace, especially the facade, with designs by Bartolomeo Picchiatti and with a portal entryway sculpted by Vitale Finelli.

The palace's peak came in the 18th century when Raimondo di Sangro, 7th Prince of San Severo, redesigned the interior of the chapel and palace and linked the two buildings with a passageway. A marble plaque on the facade commemorates his association with the palace. He began the works in 1735 and they were completed by his son Vincenzo in the 1790s. On the night of 28 September 1889 the passageway was flooded and collapsed.

The atrium has anthropomorphic sculptural decorations attributed to Giuseppe Sammartino and Francesco Celebrano. The mezzanine decorations of the Seasons are also attributed to Celebrano. The palace was once decorated with frescos by Belisario Corenzio, destroyed during the collapse of the hall.
