= Paolo Persico =

Italian sculptor

Paolo Persico (c. 1729—1796), was an Italian sculptor of the late-Baroque, active at and near Naples.

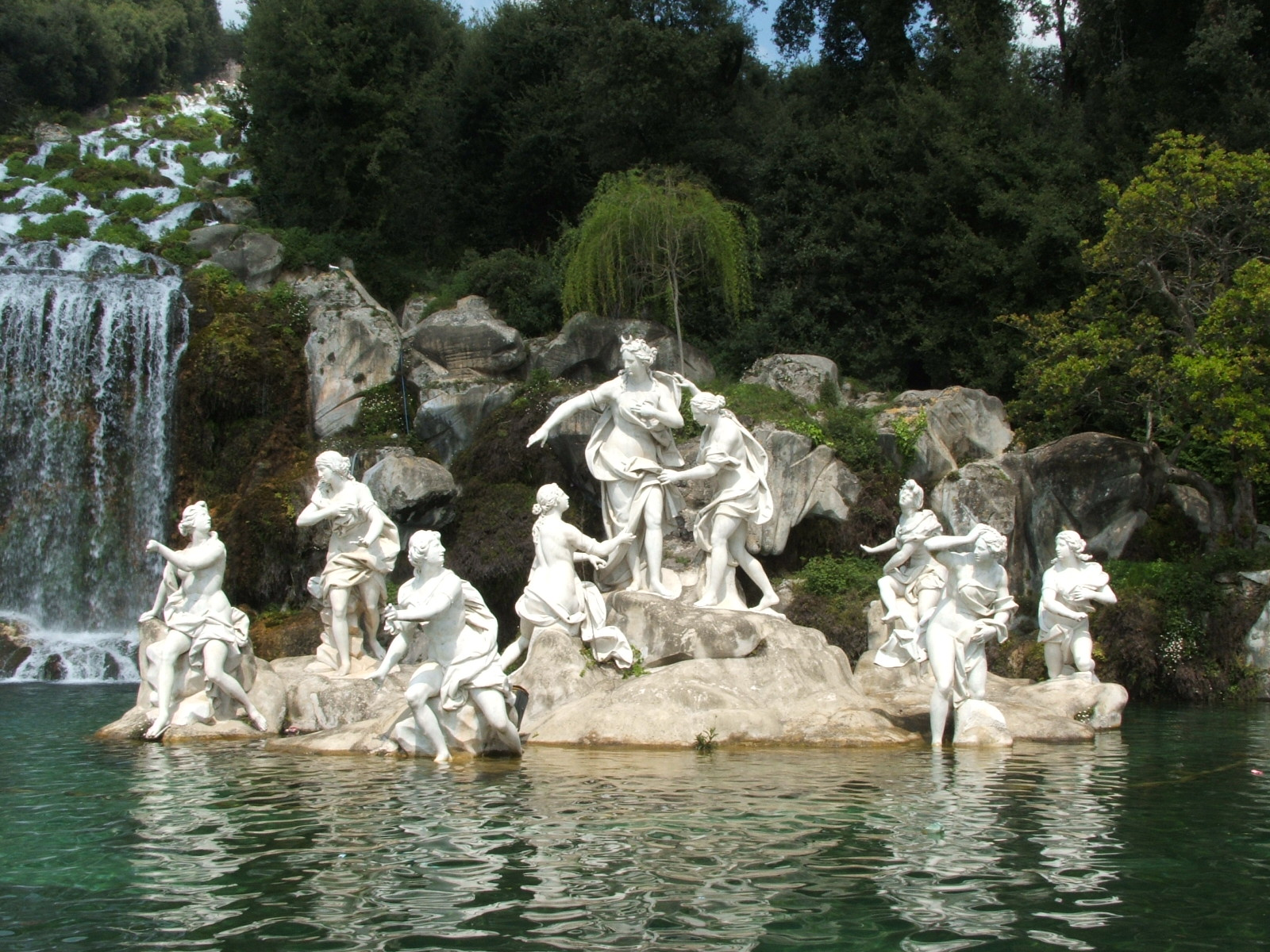
Diana and Acteon

He is best known for sculptures in the gardens of Palace of Caserta, including the figures of Diana and Acteon in a fountain. He also contributed statues of the Lions for the entrance stairway, a Faun, The Gladiator, and an Apollo. His work at Caserta was a collaborative project with contributions by Angelo Brunelli, Pietro Solari, Andrea Violani, and Gaetano Salomone. He also produced sculptures, including the statuary group called Soavità del giogo matrimoniale and the angels in the complex bas-relief of the main altarpiece depicting the Deposition (collaboration with Francesco Celebrano) for the Sansevero Chapel in Naples.
