= Raimondo di Sangro =

Italian nobleman, inventor, soldier, writer, scientist, alchemist and freemason

Raimondo di Sangro, Prince of Sansevero
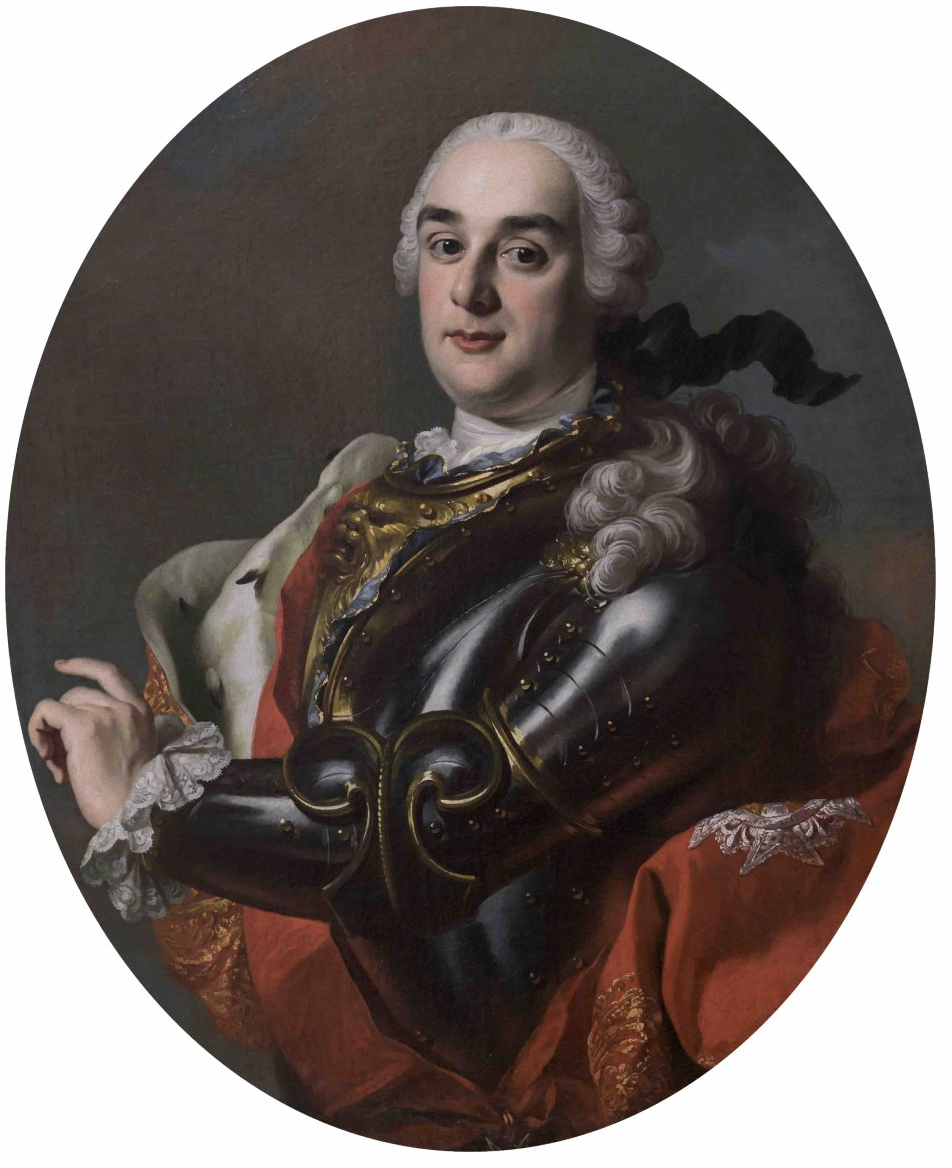
- Portrait of Raimondo di Sangro by Francesco de Mura
- Born: 30 January 1710; Torremaggiore, Kingdom of Naples
- Died: 22 March 1771 (aged 61); Naples, Kingdom of Naples
- Burial place: Cappella Sansevero; 40.8492992°N 14.2549331°E
- Military career
- Allegiance: Kingdom of Naples
- Rank: Colonel
- Commands: Reggimento Provinciale di Capitanata
- Conflicts: War of the Austrian Succession: Battle of Velletri

Raimondo di Sangro, Prince of Sansevero (30 January 1710 – 22 March 1771) was an Italian nobleman, inventor, soldier, writer, scientist, alchemist and freemason best remembered for his reconstruction of the Sansevero Chapel in Naples.

== Early life ==
The seventh Prince of San Severo was born in Torremaggiore into a noble family. His father was Antonio, Duke of Torremaggiore, and his mother was Cecilia Gaetani dell'Aquila d'Aragona. His mother died shortly after his birth. He spent his earliest years in Naples and in 1720 he was sent to the Jesuit Roman College in Rome to be educated. He studied under Athanasius Kircher's successor, the polymath Filippo Bonanni, and became fascinated with the Kircherian Museum and Jesuit scientific tradition. In 1726 he inherited the title of prince of Sansevero from his grandfather.

== Career ==
In 1730, at the age of 20, he returned to Naples, where he met some of the most important intellectuals in the kingdom, including Celestino Galiani and Antonio Genovesi. In 1742 he was appointed Lord Chamberlain by king Charles III and the following year he became a member of the prestigious Accademia della Crusca.

In 1744 he distinguished himself at the head of a regiment during the Battle of Velletri, in the war between the Habsburgs and the Bourbons. While in command of the military he built a cannon out of lightweight materials which had a longer range than the standard ones of the time, and wrote a military treatise on the employment of infantry (Manuale di esercizi militari per la fanteria) for which he was praised by Frederick II of Prussia.

His real interests, however, were the studies of alchemy, mechanics and the sciences in general. Among his inventions were:

- A hydraulic device that could pump water to any height
- An "eternal flame", using chemical compounds of his own invention
- A carriage with wood and cork "horses" which, driven by a cunning system of paddlewheels, could travel on both land and water
- Coloured fireworks
- A printing press which could print different colours in a single impression.

== Publishing ==
The Prince spoke several European languages, as well as Arabic and Hebrew. After returning to Naples he set up a printing press in the basement of his house where he printed both his own works and those of others, some of which he translated himself. As some of these were censored by the ecclesiastical authorities he also wrote anonymously. Some of his publications were clearly influenced by Freemasonry, and he communicated with fellow masons such as the Scot Andrew Michael Ramsay, whose Travels of Cyrus he translated and published, and the English poet Alexander Pope, whose Rape of the Lock he translated and published (although, due to condemnations by the Jesuits, he had to deny these activities). He was head of the Neapolitan masonic lodge until he was excommunicated by the Church, making an enemy of the Neapolitan cardinal Giuseppe Spinelli. The excommunication was later revoked by Pope Benedict XIV, probably on account of the influence of the di Sangro family.

While in Naples, he forged a friendship with Fortunato-Bartolommeo de Félice, 2nd Count di Panzutti, who had been appointed chair of experimental physics and mathematics at Naples University by Celestino Galiani and later set up the famous publishing press at Yverdon in 1762. Together the Prince and the Count translated the physicist John Arbuthnot's works from Latin.

== Rumours ==
Many legends grew up around his alchemical activities: that he could create blood out of nothing, that he could replicate the liquefaction of blood of San Gennaro, that he had people killed so that he could use their bones and skin for experiments. The Sansevero Chapel was said to have been constructed on an old temple of Isis, and di Sangro was said to have been a Rosicrucian. To justify this, locals pointed to a massive Statue of the God of the Nile, located just around the corner from his home.

Raimondo di Sangro is also rumored to have initiatied the alchemist Cagliostro, into the Egyptian Rite in Naples, around 1767.

To add to the sense of dread, di Sangro's family home in Naples, the Palazzo Sansevero, was the scene of a brutal murder at the end of the 16th century, when the composer Carlo Gesualdo caught his wife and her lover in flagrante delicto, and hacked them to death in their bed.

== Later life ==
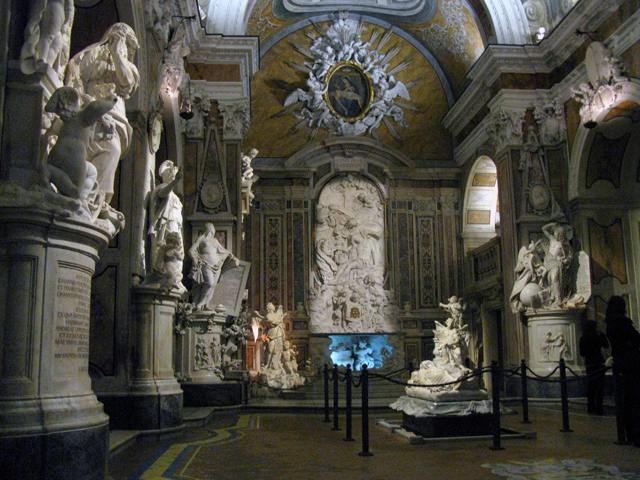
Sansevero Chapel

The last years of his life were dedicated to decorating the Sansevero Chapel with marble works from the greatest artists of the time, including Antonio Corradini, Francesco Queirolo, and Giuseppe Sanmartino (whose Veiled Christ's detailed marble veil was thought by many to be created by di Sangro's alchemy) and preparing anatomical models. Two of the models, known as anatomical machines, are still on display in the chapel, and have given rise to legends as to how they were constructed (even today the exact method is not known). Until recently many Neapolitans believed that the models were of his servant and a pregnant woman, into whose veins an artificial substance was injected under pressure, but the latest research has shown that the models are artificial.

He destroyed his own scientific archive before he died. After his death, his descendants, under threat of excommunication by the Church due to di Sangro's involvement with Freemasonry and alchemy, destroyed what was left of his writings, formulae, laboratory equipment and results of experiments.

== Death ==
Raimondo di Sangro died in Naples in 1771, his death being hastened by the continuous use of dangerous chemicals in his experiments and inventions. In 1794, the Swedish naturalist Carl Peter Thunberg named the plant genus Sansevieria after him.

== Bibliography ==
- Imbruglia, Girolamo (2017). "SANGRO, Raimondo di". Dizionario Biografico degli Italiani (in Italian). Vol. 90: Salvestrini–Saviozzo da Siena. Rome: Istituto dell'Enciclopedia Italiana. ISBN 978-88-12-00032-6.
- Ceglia, Francesco Paolo de (2020). "The fantastic anatomy of Raimondo de Sangro, prince of Sansevero". La Medicina Nei Secoli. 32 (2): 657–678.
- "Sansevero Chapel Website". www.museosansevero.it (in Italian).
- Donato, Clorinda (2014). "Esoteric Reason, Occult Science, and Radical Enlightenment: Seamless Pursuits in the Work and Networks of Raimondo Di Sangro, The Prince of San Severo". Philosophica. 89 (1): 179–237. doi:10.21825/philosophica.82130.
- Donato, Clorinda (2016). "Between Myth and Archive, Alchemy and Science in Eighteenth-Century Naples: The Cabinet of Raimondo di Sangro, Prince of San Severo". In Keith Michael Baker; Jenna M. Gibbs (eds.). Life Forms in the Thinking of the Long Eighteenth Century. Toronto: University of Toronto Press. pp. 208–232. ISBN 978-1442630246. JSTOR 10.3138/j.ctt1ch7747.14.
