= Counts of Marsi =

The Conti di Marsi, the Counts of Marsi, were a lineage of Frankish origin who figured among the main feudal lords of Abruzzo, part of the Duchy of Spoleto in southern Italy, during the eleventh and twelfth centuries.

With Celano as their main seat, they ruled over a territory that stretched from Lake Fucino as far as the Peligni.

== History ==
=== Origins ===
The Counts of Marsi descended from a certain Berardo who was called "Francesco" because he came from Francia, who came to Italy with Hugh of Provence, King of Italy from 924 until his death in 948. According to the Chronicle of Monte Cassino, the first known member of this family, Azzo, Berardo's uncle, was a Burgundian count (Azzo comes Burgundiæ, avunculus Berardi). The conti di Marsi considered themselves Berardinga, "Berardings" or, by modern historians, Bosonids.

=== Early lineage ===
The chronicler of Monte Cassino who records this decisive event was of the house himself, Leo Marsicanus (1046, Marsica — 1115 or 1117, Ostia) (meaning "of the Marsi"), also known as Leone dei Conti di Marsi; Leo became a monk in Monte Cassino around 1061 and served as a cardinal in the early twelfth century.

As Azzo and Berardo arrived in Italy with Hugh in 926, it is likely that these Burgundian counts originated in Lower Burgundy, originally the southern part of the kingdom of Burgundy, where Hugh's family originated. Though the name Azzo is familiar today from the Este family, later rulers in Ferrara and Modena, the name was not unusual in northern Italy at the time.

The Lombard gastaldate of Marsi in the territory of the dukes of Spoleto was erected as a county by Louis the Pious.

=== Ecclesiastical Influence ===
Three sons of Berardo are recorded in the Chronicle of Monte Cassino, Rinaldo and Oderisio, both counts of Marsi in a charter of 981 (Raynaldus et Oderisi germanis comitibus; the charter was occasioned by a property dispute settled by Otto II, Holy Roman Emperor) and Azzo II, whose son Lupo was abbot of Montecassino. Abbot Lupo's first cousin Oderisio and his wife Gibberga were joint benefactors of Monte Cassino.

Powerful nobles like the conti di Marsi expected to place their sons in commanding positions in the church hierarchy as well. Marsi itself was an ancient episcopal see, and younger sons of the counts served repeatedly as bishops: Alberic, son of Berardo III, succeeded in 970 to the see, in which he was succeeded by his natural son, Guinizio, in 994. In 1056, Azzo dei conti di Marsi was transferred from his see of Chieti to that of Marsi. In 1110 Berardo dei conti di Marsi was named bishop by Paschal II; Berardo was a cardinal, with the tituli first of S. Angelo in Pescheria, then of S. Grisogono, and was canonized long afterwards (1802) as Saint Berardo; his great niece, Saint Rosalia, is patroness of Palermo. The chronicler Amatus of Montecassino names Oderisius, the oldest brother of Berard, Count of Marsia, against whom Berard rebelled, specifying that he had seven sons, two of whom were bishops, a third a monk and a cardinal at Rome. This Bernard, who died after 1070/73, "through insatiable greed and desire for wealth fell out with his brother" the chronicler reports.

=== Decline ===
Dissension among the counts of Marsi enabled the a new power to be reckoned with in the south of Italy, that of Robert Guiscard, whose base of power lay to the south, in Apulia and Calabria, to defeat the individual members of the Berardings and establish Norman power in southern Italy.
