= Torremaggiore =

- Comune
- Comune di Torremaggiore
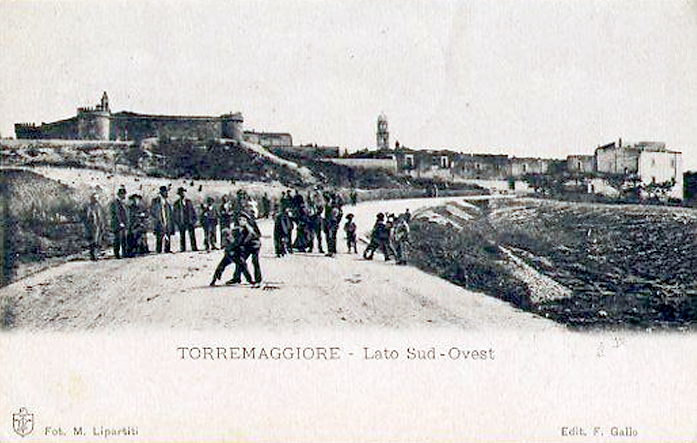
- Old postcard of Torremaggiore, ducal castle to the left

- Coat of arms

- Location within Italy Location within Apulia
- Coordinates: 41°41′N 15°17′E
- Country: Italy
- Region: Apulia
- Province: Foggia (FG)
- Frazioni: Petrulli

Government
  - Mayor: Emilio Di Pumpo

Area
  - Total: 210.01 km^{2} (81.09 sq mi)
- Elevation: 169 m (554 ft)

Population (01-01-2021)
  - Total: 16,643
  - Density: 79.249/km^{2} (205.25/sq mi)
- Demonym: Torremaggiorese(i)
- Time zone: UTC+1 (CET)
  - Summer (DST): UTC+2 (CEST)
- Postal code: 71017
- Dialing code: 0882
- Patron saint: St. Sabinus Bishop
- Saint day: First Sunday in June
- Website: Official website

Torremaggiore is a town, comune (municipality) and former seat of a bishopric, in the province of Foggia in Apulia (in Italian: Puglia), region of southeast Italy.

It lies on a hill, 169 metres (554 ft) over the sea, and is famous for production of wine and olives.

== History ==
The history of Torremaggiore is strictly connected to that of the burg of (Castel) Fiorentino (di Puglia), a Byzantine frontier stronghold founded by the Italian catepan Basil Boioannes in 1018.

- Later a Norman, Hohenstaufen, Angevine and finally Aragonese possession, it is especially remembered as the death place of Holy Roman Emperor Frederick II on 13 December 1250.
- Five years later the burg was attacked by Pope Alexander IV's troops, and the inhabitants fled to a nearby Benedictine abbey. Later they were allowed to found a new settlement, called Codacchio, later, when other refugees from Dragonara arrived, christened Terra Maioris ("Major Land"), the modern Torremaggiore. This burg was later a fief of the Counts (later Dukes) of Sangro. It was destroyed by an earthquake on July 30, 1627.
- On 17 March 1862 a platoon of newly united Italy's royal troops was defeated by the brigands of Carmine Crocco; 21 soldiers were killed, even their captain Francesco Richard.
- From 25 August 1925, Torremaggiore was connected to the nearby San Severo by a tramway, the first in southern Italy.

== Ecclesiastical history ==
Fiorentina was the seat of the Diocese of Fiorentino, established in 1059. In 1391 it was suppressed and its territory merged into the Diocese of Lucera. The name Fiorentino (Florentinensis) has been used, since 1969 as a Latin Catholic titular bishopric.

== Main sights ==
- Castle of Fiorentino (11th century), place of death of Emperor Frederick II.
- Castle of Dragonara (11th century).
- The Castle of the Dukes (originally Counts) of Sangro, built from a Norman tower, has maintained the Renaissance appearance. It includes four circular and two square towers, and a throne hall with a 17th-century fresco frieze. It is home to the archaeological exhibition of findings from Fiorentino.
- Chiesa matrice di San Nicola ("Mother Church of St. Nicholas", 13th century), built by the refugees from Fiorentino and Dragonara, rebuilt in 1631 after the earthquake.
- Church of Santa Maria della Strada (early 16th century).
- Sanctuary of Santa Maria della Fontana.
- Church of the Madonna di Loreto (16th century), erected by Albanian immigrants. It was rebuilt in 1627.
- Church of Santa Maria degli Angeli (17th century).

== People ==
- Rogerius of Apulia (c.1205–1266), medieval Catholic monk and chronicler
- Luigi Rossi (1597–1653), musician
- Raimondo di Sangro (1710–1771), prince and scientist
- Nicola Fiani (1757–1799), patriot and radical, executed after the collapse of the Parthenopean Republic
- Fortune Gallo (1878–1970), opera impresario
- Nicola Sacco (1891–1927), anarchist, executed with Bartolomeo Vanzetti following a controversial American trial
- Giuseppe Eccellente (1880-1931), violinist, Terremaggiore
- Edoardo Santini, model and seminarian

== Twinned cities ==
- Buffalo, United States
- Canosa di Puglia, Italy
- Villafalletto, Italy

== See also ==
- Foggia Airfield Complex, also known as Torremaggiore Airfield
- List of Catholic dioceses in Italy

== Sources and external links ==
- GCatholic with residential and titular incumbent biography links
