= Edoardo Santini =

Italian model and Catholic seminarian

Edoardo Santini (5 November 2002) is an Italian former model and current Catholic seminarian.

== Early life ==
Santini dreamed of being a dancer, swimmer, or actor as a young man. He considered the priesthood as a child. He has lived in Castelfiorentino and in Tuscany.

== Most handsome man in Italy ==
In 2019, Santini entered and won a pageant sponsored by the fashion group ABE. At 17 years old he was declared to be "Italy's Most Handsome Man." The contest led to contracts as a model and 11,000 followers on Instagram.

== Seminarian ==
In 2022, Santini went to live with two priests, which he called "the most beautiful experience of my life." After a year, he asked Archbishop Giuseppe Betori to enter into a year-long preparatory course called the propaedeutic stage with the intention of entering the seminary at its conclusion.

On 23 November 2023, Santini released a video on social media announcing his decision and that he was serving two parishes in the Archdiocese of Florence. He also said attending World Youth Day 2023 in Portugal was a turning point in his life.
