= Giuseppe Sanmartino =

Italian sculptor (1720–1793)

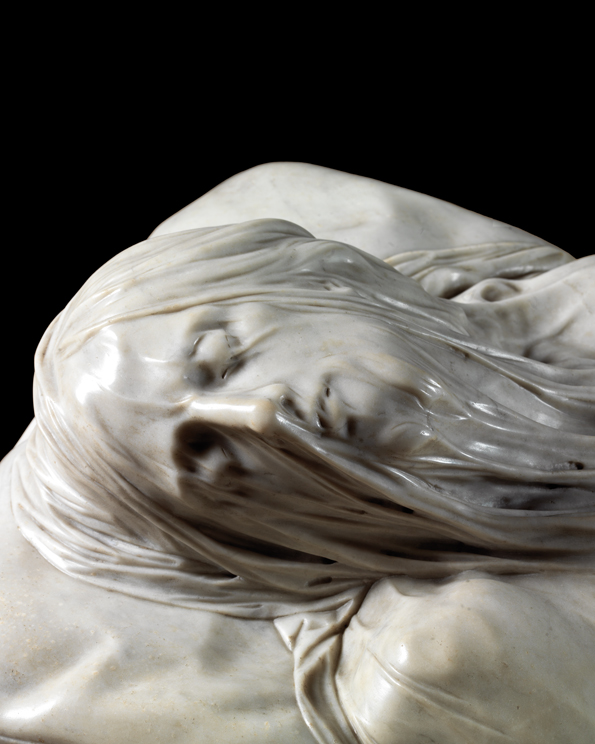
- Detail of Sanmartino's Veiled Christ, on exhibit at the Cappella Sansevero in Naples, Italy
- Born: 1720; Naples, Kingdom of Naples
- Died: 12 December 1793 (aged 72–73); Naples, Kingdom of Naples
- Known for: Sculpture
- Notable work: Veiled Christ
- Movement: Late-Baroque

Giuseppe Sanmartino or Sammartino (1720 – 12 December 1793) was a prominent Italian sculptor in Naples during the late Baroque period who focused on religious sculptures. His most famous work is the Veiled Christ (1753) in Sansevero Chapel in Naples.

== Biography ==
=== Early life ===
There is little known about Sanmartino's early life. He was born in Naples in 1720. He trained in the workshop of Matteo Bottiglieri, as well as the studio of Domenico Antonio Vaccaro.

=== Early career ===
His first dated (1753) work is Veiled Christ or Christ lying under the Shroud, commissioned initially from the Venetian sculptor Antonio Corradini who did not live to complete the work. Sammartino interpreted his sketches freely to create a masterly sculpture which can be seen in Sansevero Chapel (called in Italian Cappella Sansevero or Pietatella) in Naples. Other contributors to this chapel were Francesco Celebrano and the Genoese sculptor Francesco Queirolo.

The statue of Veiled Christ is elaborately artificial (art historian Wittkower labeled it as a hypertrophic effort) by reproducing in stone the effect of a thin veil. In the same chapel, Corradini's antecedent statue of Chastity (also called Modesty) is present. Innocenzo Spinazzi, a contemporary Florentine sculptor, also completed statues with this effect.

=== Mature work ===
Successful completion of this commission earned Sanmartino further commissions. These included the group of St. Augustine in the Neapolitan church of Sant'Agostino alla Zecca, the decoration of the Annunziata church, and the monument to Prince Filippo of Naples, Duke of Calabria in the Basilica of Santa Chiara. He also executed a series of nativity scenes.

Sanmartino sculpted some intensely expressive portraits for elaborate funerary monuments; they seem to have been inspired by contemporary Neapolitan paintings such as those of Giuseppe Bonito and Carlo Amalfi, with a decorative treatment of both the pose of the sitter and his clothes, combined with a comparatively unidealized treatment of the face. That of the scholar Alessio Simmaco Mazzocchi (Naples, Santa Restituta), from a design by Attigiati, is the earliest of these.

=== Later career ===
In 1772, on the advice of Luigi Vanvitelli, Sanmartino took up some teaching work at the Reale Accademia di Belle Arti in Naples. In 1775–76 he produced two monumental statues of Saint Peter and Saint Paul for the façade of San Filippo Neri, the Hieronymite church, for which small terracotta models survive (Naples, National Museum of San Martino; Rome, Palazzo Barberini). The formal elegance typical of Sanmartino is particularly well illustrated by two late statues of angels bearing torches (1787) at the sides of the main altar in San Filippo Neri.

During the last years of his life Sanmartino also provided designs for silver sculpture; examples are the statues of Saint Vitus (1786–87; Forio, island of Ischia, San Vito), executed by the silversmiths Giuseppe del Giudice and Gennaro del Giudice, and Saint Roch, carried out by Biagio Giordano (1793; Ruvo Cathedral). After Sanmartino’s death, the same del Giudice silversmiths executed the almost life-size group of Tobias and the Angel (1797; Naples Cathedral, Royal Chapel of the Treasure of St. Januarius) after his designs. Sanmartino is documented as the creator of shepherds and other crèche figures, although such attributions are very problematic.

== Select works ==
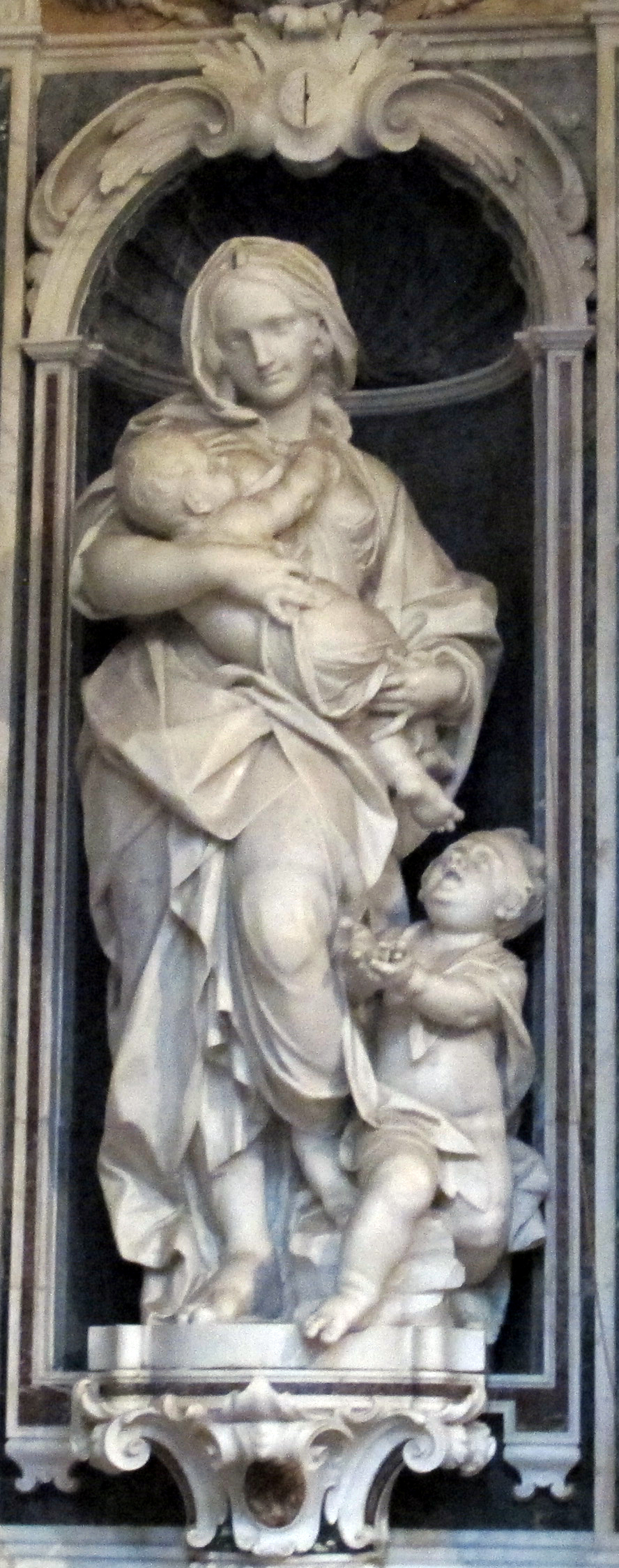
Charity, Certosa di San Martino, Naples

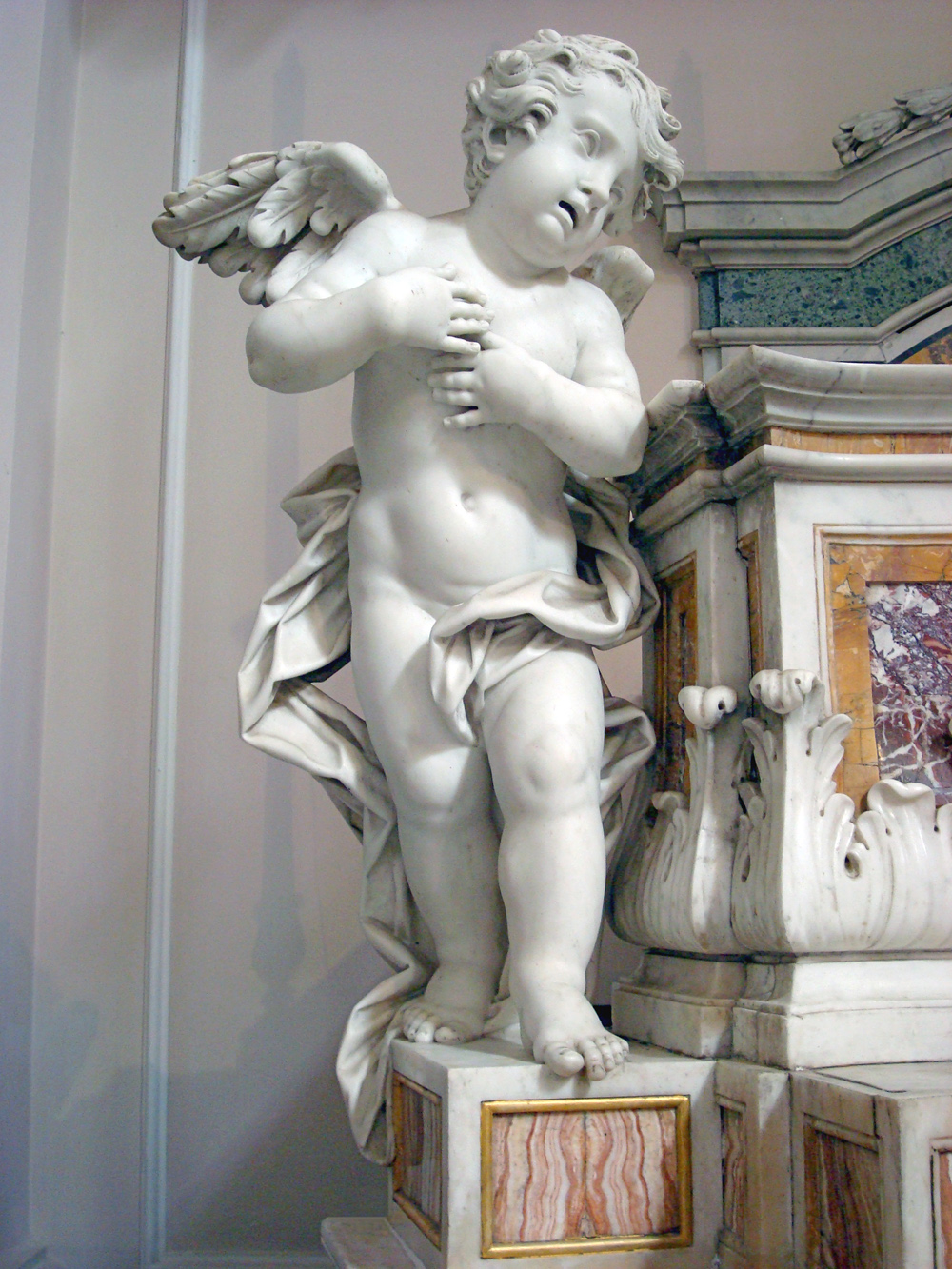
Putto, Sansevero Chapel

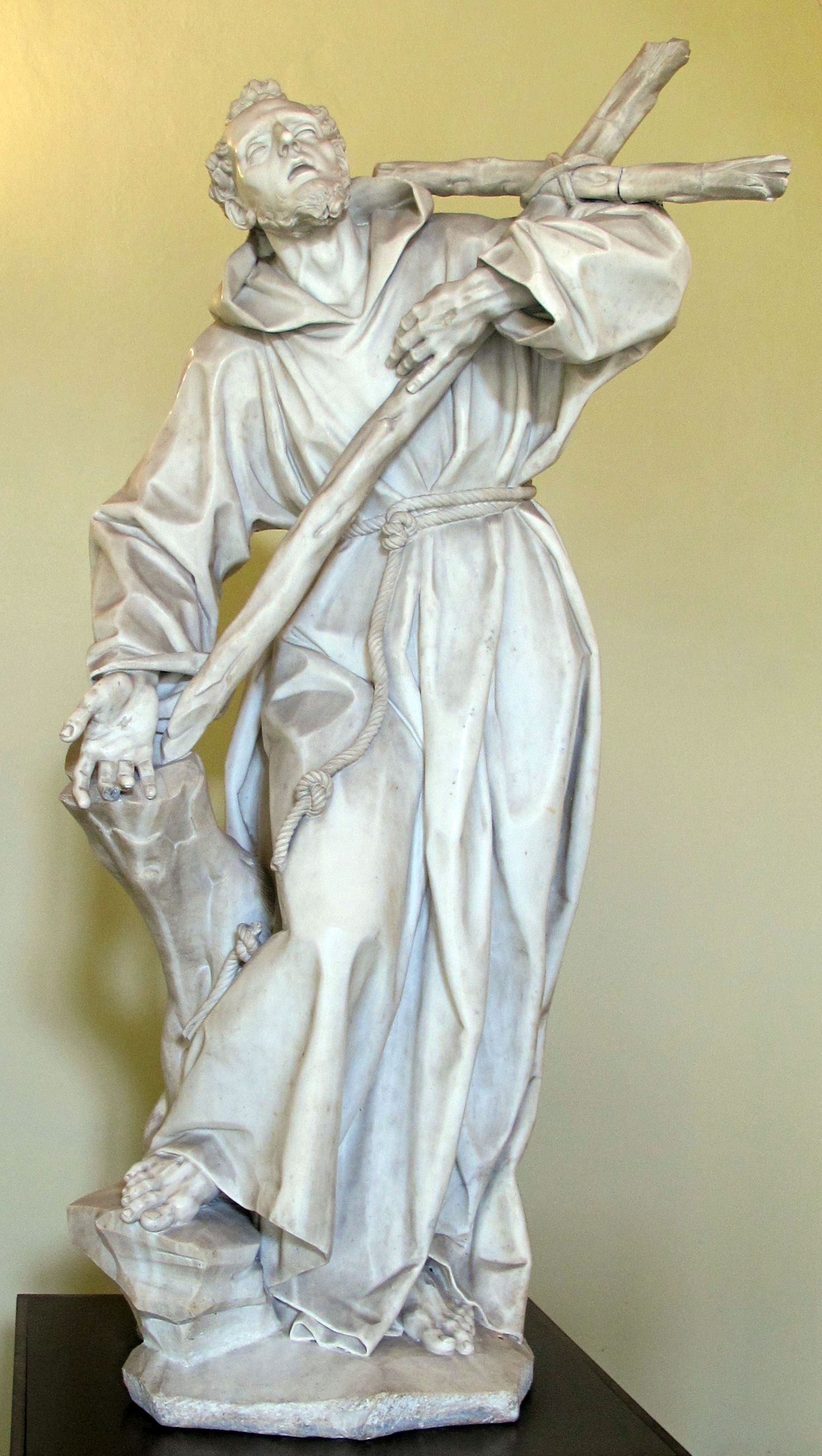
Ecstasy of Saint Francis, Museo di San Martino, Naples

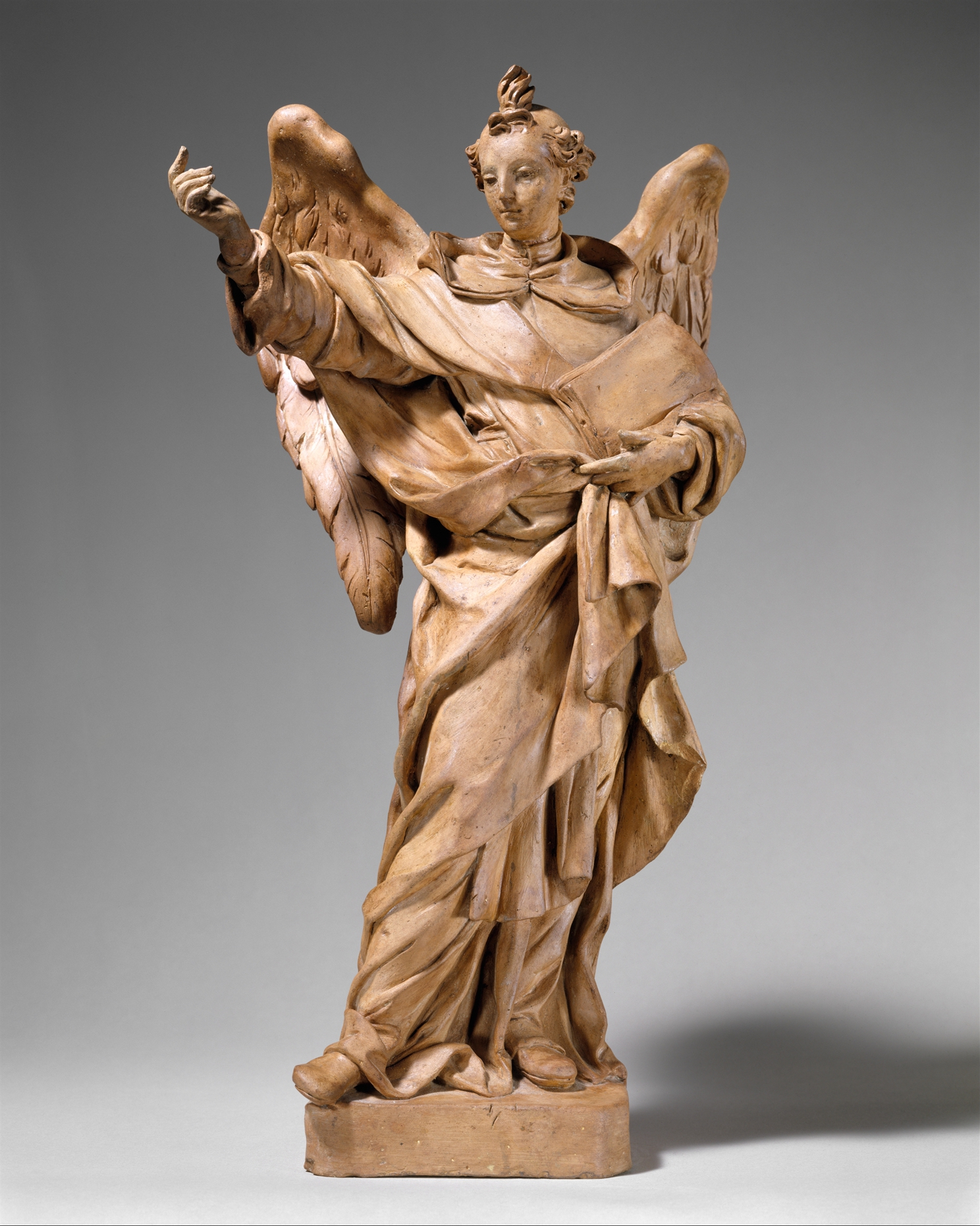
Saint Vincent Ferrer, model by Giuseppe Sanmartino, Metropolitan Museum of Art, New York

== Bibliography ==
- D'Alfonso, Alessandro (2017). "SANMARTINO, Giuseppe". Dizionario Biografico degli Italiani (in Italian). Vol. 90: Salvestrini–Saviozzo da Siena. Rome: Istituto dell'Enciclopedia Italiana. ISBN 978-88-12-00032-6.
