= Hetztheater =

Coordinates: 48°12′34.7″N 16°23′14.2″E

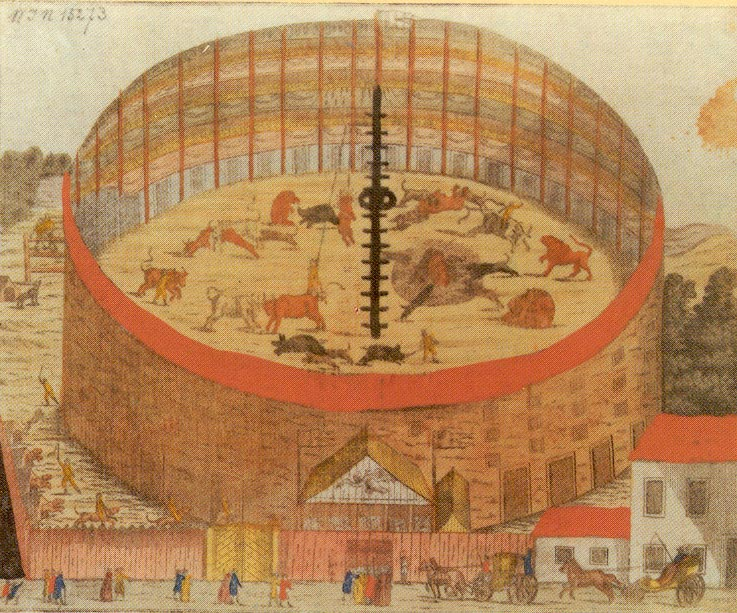
Hetztheater in the 18th century

The Hetztheater was an exhibition place for animal fighting in Vienna that existed from 1755 to 1796. It was a circular structure based on the amphitheaters of ancient Rome used for gladiatorial combat and animal baiting. Similar structures existed in the Baroque period in Berlin (the Hetzgarten), Nuremberg (Fechthaus) and in Königsberg.

== History ==
The first Viennese theater for animal baiting was built in 1708 in the eastern suburb of Leopoldstadt. From 1738 to 1743, there was another one at the Heumarkt, which was closed due to a lack of financial success. The Frenchman Carl Defraine built a large wooden amphitheater with three tiers in 1755, which could hold about 3,000 people and which flourished for several decades despite high admission prices. The Viennese dialect expression "Hetz" in the meaning of "fun" originates from the events at the structure.

The burning of the Hetztheater in an engraving by Hieronymus Löschenkohl

On September 1, 1796, the Hetztheater burned down, killing two lions, a panther, and several bears. As a result, Emperor Franz II no longer issued a permit to hold animal baiting. The street in which the theater stood still bears the name Hetzgasse to this day.

== Literature ==
- Felix Czeike : Historical Lexicon Vienna . Vienna 1992–1997. Vol. 3; P. 175
- City Chronicle Vienna . Vienna 1986, p. 166f
- Helmut Kretschmer: Theater fires in Vienna . Association for the History of the City of Vienna, Vienna 1981, ( Wiener Geschichtsblätter supplement 7, 1981), (exhibition catalog: 154th small exhibition of the Vienna City and State Archives, City Hall, 6th staircase, 1st floor, December 1981 to February 1982), p 4–5.
