= Bernardo Schiaffino =

Italian sculptor (1678–1725)

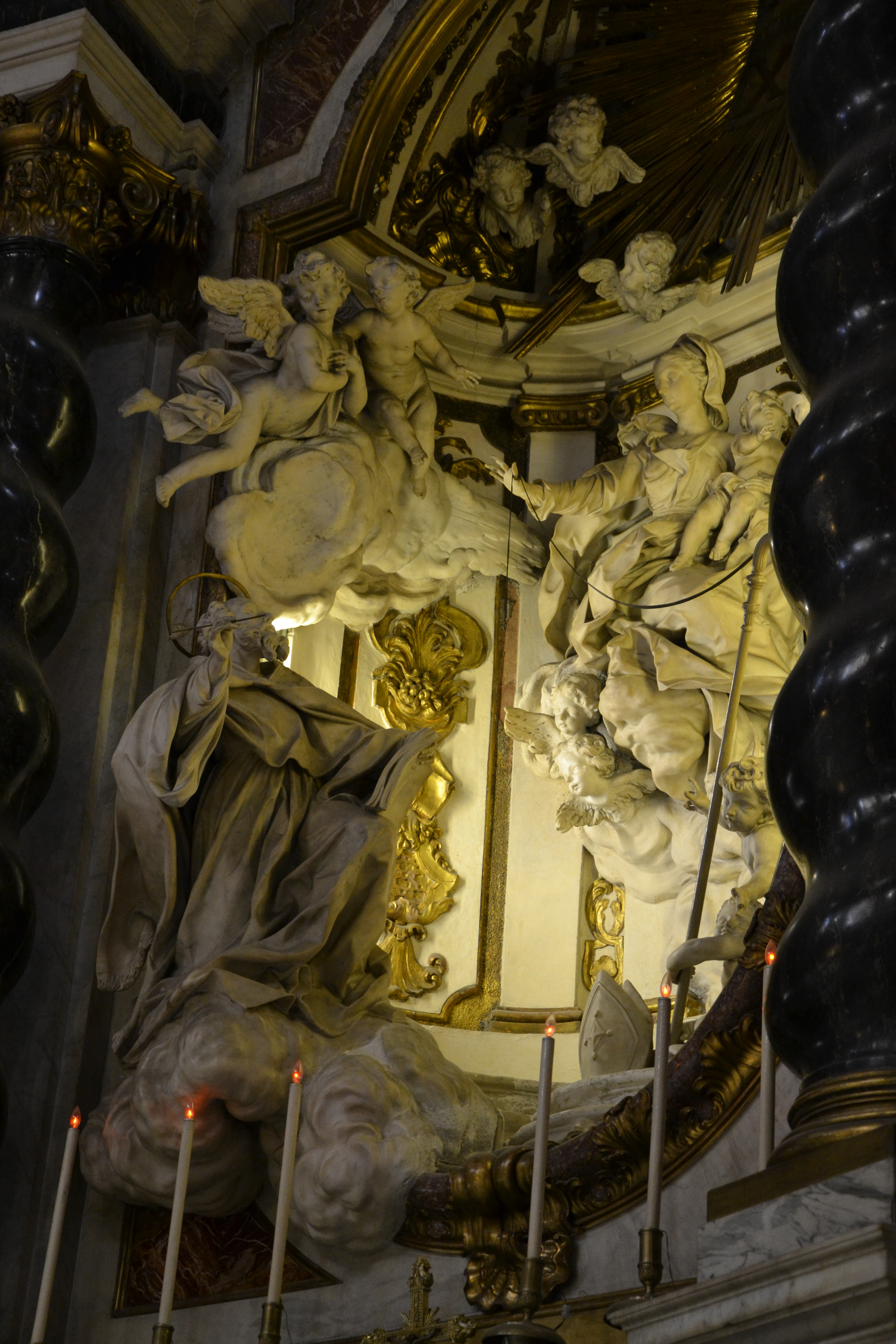
Sculpture of Saint Augustine and the Virgin Mary in the church of the Madonna della Consolazione in Genoa, Italy.

Bernardo Schiaffino (1678 – 6 May 1725) was an Italian sculptor of the Baroque period, active mainly in his natal city of Genoa.

He was one of two sculptors in his family, along with his younger brother Francesco Maria Schiaffino. He trained with Domenico Parodi. He befriended the Piola family of artists; Domenico Piola provided him with some designs, and Bernardo was close friends with his son Paolo Girolamo Piola. In his biography, it claims he died of melancholy after the death of his inseparable friend. Among his pupils was Francesco Queirolo.
