= Francesco Maria Schiaffino =

Italian sculptor (1688–1763)

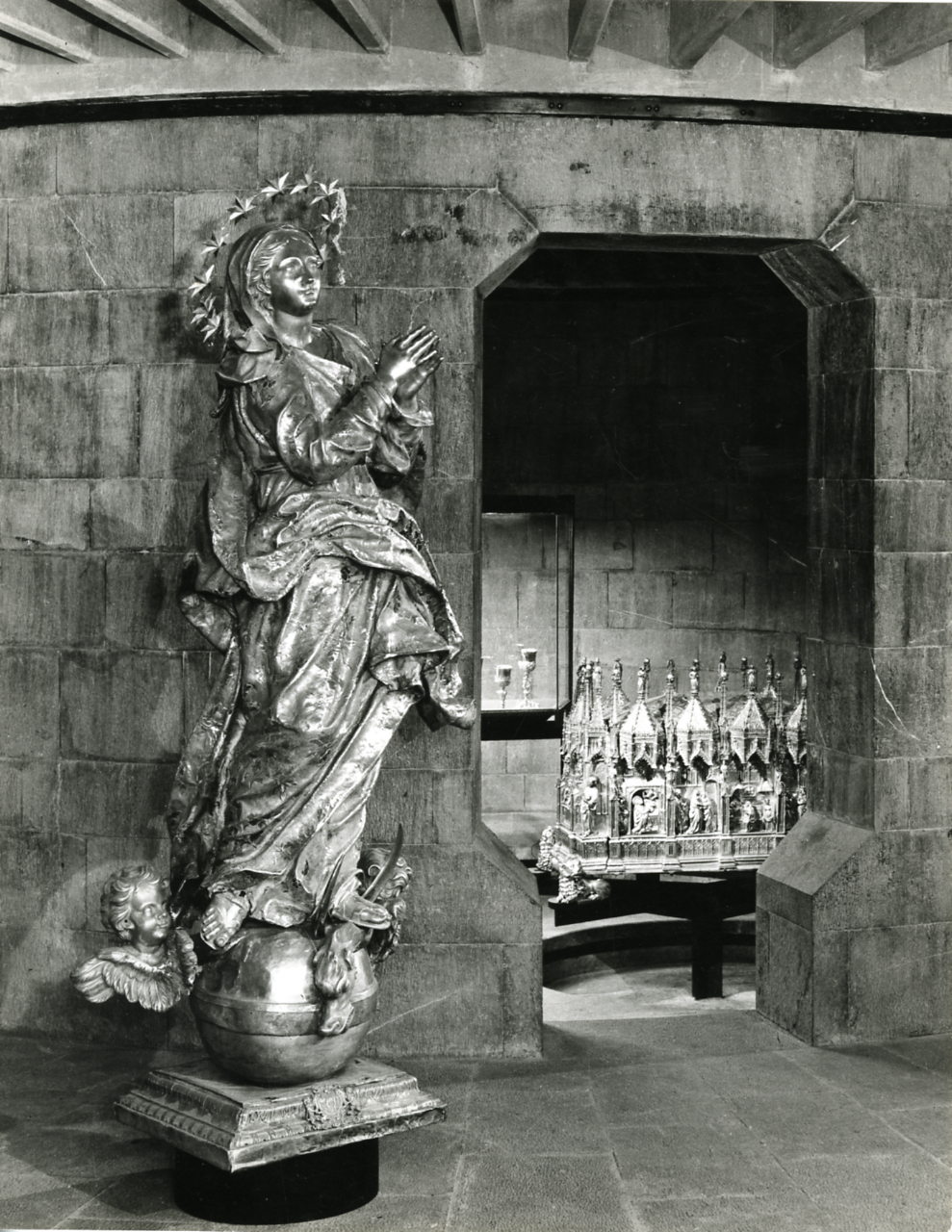
Francesco Maria Schiaffino, statue of the Immacolata, Museum of the treasure, Cathedral of San Lorenzo, Genoa. Photo by Paolo Monti, 1963.

Francesco Maria Schiaffino (17 July 1688 – 3 January 1763) was an Italian sculptor of the Rococo, or late-Baroque, mainly active in his native city of Genoa.

Born into a family of sculptors, including his older brother Bernardo Schiaffino. In 1721–24, he apprenticed in the Roman studio of Camillo Rusconi. Returning to Genoa, he executed such works as St Dominic for the Teatro Carlo Felice, and Pluto and Proserpine sculpted for the Palazzo Reale. In 1738, he designed the theatrical funeral monument to Caterina Fieschi Adorno for the church of Santissima Annunziata di Portoria, Genoa. In 1739, he also designed wax models of eight apostles and four doctors of the church (modelled after the apostle statues in the niches of San Giovanni in Laterano by Rusconi and others; these were used by Diego Francesco Carlone, to execute in stucco for the church of Santa Maria Assunta di Carignano. He had statues sent to the towns of Sestri, Camogli, and Albissola.
