= Francesco Queirolo =

Italian sculptor

Francesco Queirolo (Italian pronunciation: [franˈtʃesko kweiˈrɔːlo]; 1704 – 1762) was an Italian Genoese-born sculptor, active in Rome and Naples during the Rococo period.

== Biography ==
=== Early life ===
Francesco Queirolo was born in Genoa in 1704. He studied under Bernardo Schiaffino in Genoa and completed his training in Giuseppe Rusconi's studio in Rome. From the mid-1730s Queirolo produced decorative sculptures for important architectural projects in Rome. He worked in collaboration with such architects as Alessandro Galilei, Nicola Salvi and Ferdinando Fuga, and he executed over life-size travertine statues of Saint Philip Benizi de Damiani (1734–35; Rome, façade of San Giovanni dei Fiorentini), Saint Charles Borromeo ( 1742–43; Rome, Santa Maria Maggiore) and of Gifts of Autumn (1735; Rome, Trevi Fountain). He provided stucco decoration for Santa Trinità della Missione and Santissimo Nome di Maria. Queirolo designed and sculpted the tomb monument of Livia Grillo, Duchess of Tursi (1749), a bust of Christine of Sweden (1740), and probably also executed the corresponding memorial of Maria Teresa, Princess of Avellana (c. 1752), both in Sant'Andrea delle Fratte.

=== Cappella Sansevero ===
He was summoned to Naples in 1752 by Raimondo di Sangro, Prince of Sansevero, where he completed numerous sculptures while directing the decoration of the family chapel, Cappella Sansevero (Santa Maria della Pietà dei Sangro). The Allegory of Deception Unmasked ( 1752–9; Naples, S Maria della Pietà dei Sangro), an over life-size marble group, displays impressive technical virtuosity and decorates the tomb of Antonio di Sangro, Raimondo’s father. The stylistic elements associated with late Baroque classicism in Rome were replaced in Queirolo’s later work by characteristics closer to the international style of the Rococo.

== Release from Deception (Il Disinganno) ==
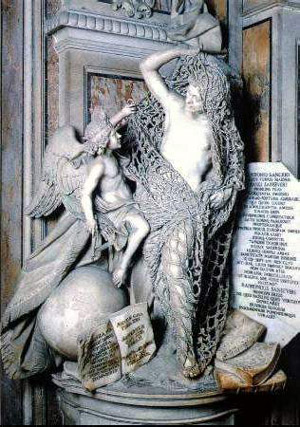
Il Disinganno

Release from Deception (Il Disinganno), produced in 1752–1759 for the Cappella Sansevero, shows a fisherman being released from a net by an angel. The masterpiece was carved from a single piece of marble. It is located in the Sansevero Chapel, Naples Italy.

The inscription on the book at the bottom of the sculpture depicts in Latin the words of the angel to the fisherman, made up of three different quotations from the Vulgate Bible put together:

VINCULA TUA DISRUMPAM (Nahum, i. 13)

VINCULA TENEBRARUM ET LONGÆ NOCTIS (QUIBUS ES) COMPEDITUS Sapientiæ, xvii. 2)

UT NON CUM HOC MUNDO DAMNERIS (St. Paul, 1 Corinthians, xi. 32)

"I will burst thy bonds asunder / those bonds of darkness and long night with which you are fettered / so that you will not be condemned with this world."

== Bibliography ==
- Wittkower, Rudolf (1993). "Art and Architecture Italy, 1600-1750". Pelican History of Art. 1980. Penguin Books. pp. 449–450.
- Giometti, Cristiano (2016). "QUEIROLO, Francesco Maria". Dizionario Biografico degli Italiani (in Italian). Vol. 85: Ponzone–Quercia. Rome: Istituto dell'Enciclopedia Italiana. ISBN 978-88-12-00032-6.
