= Cappella Sansevero =

Chapel in Naples, Italy

Coordinates: 40°50′57″N 14°15′18″E

- Chiesa di Santa Maria della Pietà
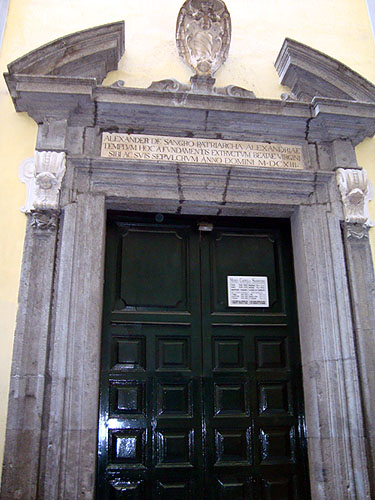
- Entrance to the chapel.
- Cappella Sansevero
- Location: Naples
- Country: Italy

History
- Founded: 1590
- Founder: John Francesco di Sangro
- Dedication: Santa Maria della Pietà

The Cappella Sansevero (also known as the Cappella Sansevero de' Sangri or Pietatella) is a chapel located on Via Francesco de Sanctis 19, just northeast of the church of San Domenico Maggiore, in the historic center of Naples, Italy. The chapel is more properly named the Chapel of Santa Maria della Pietà. It contains works of Rococo art by some of the leading Italian artists of the 18th century.

== History ==
Its origin dates to 1590 when John Francesco di Sangro, Duke of Torremaggiore, after recovering from a serious illness, had a private chapel built in what were then the gardens of the nearby Sansevero family residence, the Palazzo Sansevero. The building was converted into a family burial chapel by Alessandro di Sangro in 1613 (as inscribed on the marble plinth over the entrance to the chapel). Definitive form was given to the chapel by Raimondo di Sangro, Prince of Sansevero, who also included Masonic symbols in its reconstruction. Until 1888 a passageway connected the Sansevero palace with the chapel.

The chapel received its alternative name of Pietatella from a painting of the Virgin Mary (La Pietà), spotted there by an unjustly arrested prisoner, as reported in the book Napoli Sacra by Cesare d'Engenio Caracciolo in 1623. When the chapel was constructed it was originally dedicated to Santa Maria della Pietà, after the painting.

== Works of art ==
The chapel houses almost thirty works of art, among which are three particular sculptures of note. These marble statues are emblematic of the love of decoration in the Rococo period and their depiction of translucent veils and a fisherman's net represent remarkable artistic achievement. The Veiled Truth (Pudicizia, also called Modesty or Chastity) was completed by Antonio Corradini in 1752 as a tomb monument dedicated to Cecilia Gaetani dell'Aquila d'Aragona, mother of Raimondo. The 1753 Christ Veiled under a Shroud (also called Veiled Christ), by Giuseppe Sanmartino, shows the influence of the veiled Modesty. The Release from Deception (Disinganno) completed in 1753–54 by Francesco Queirolo of Genoa serves as a monument to Raimondo's father.

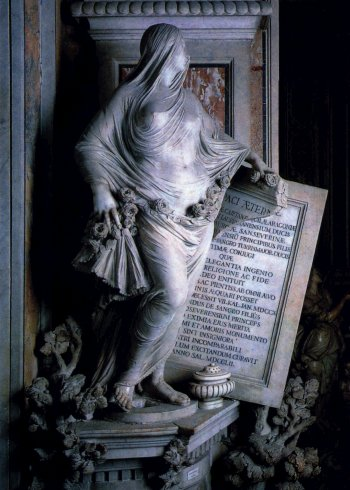
Antonio Corradini,
Pudicizia (1752)

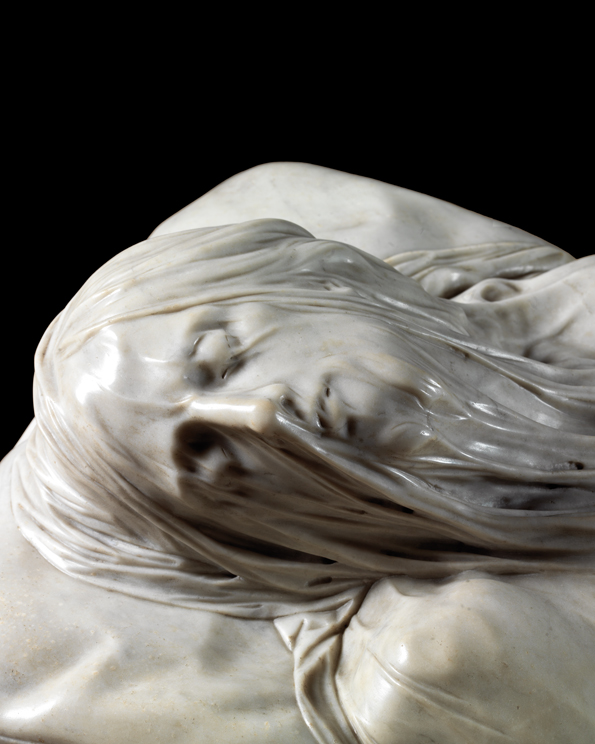
Giuseppe Sanmartino,
Veiled Christ (1753)

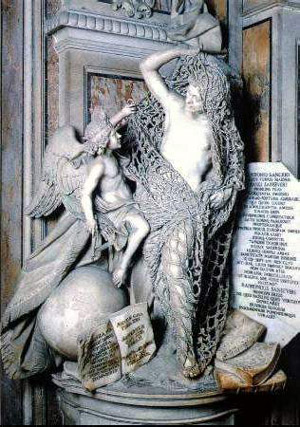
Francesco Queirolo,
Il Disinganno (1753–54)

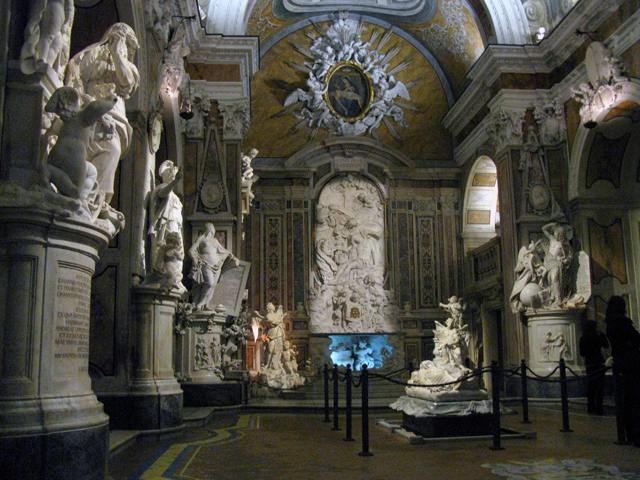
A portion of the chapel's statuary

The ceiling, the Glory of Paradise, was painted by Francesco Maria Russo in 1749. The original floor (most of the present one dates from 1901) was in black and white (said to symbolize good/evil) in the design of a labyrinth (a masonic symbol for "initiation").

In the basement there is a painting by the Roman artist Giuseppe Pesce, Madonna con Bambino, dating from around 1750. It was painted using wax-based paints of Raimondo di Sangro's own invention. The prince presented this painting to his friend Charles Bourbon, king of Naples.

=== List of works ===
The following is a list of the works of art in the chapel, numbered in the accompanying diagram, along with the artist:

Plan of the Cappella Sansevero showing the location of the works of art

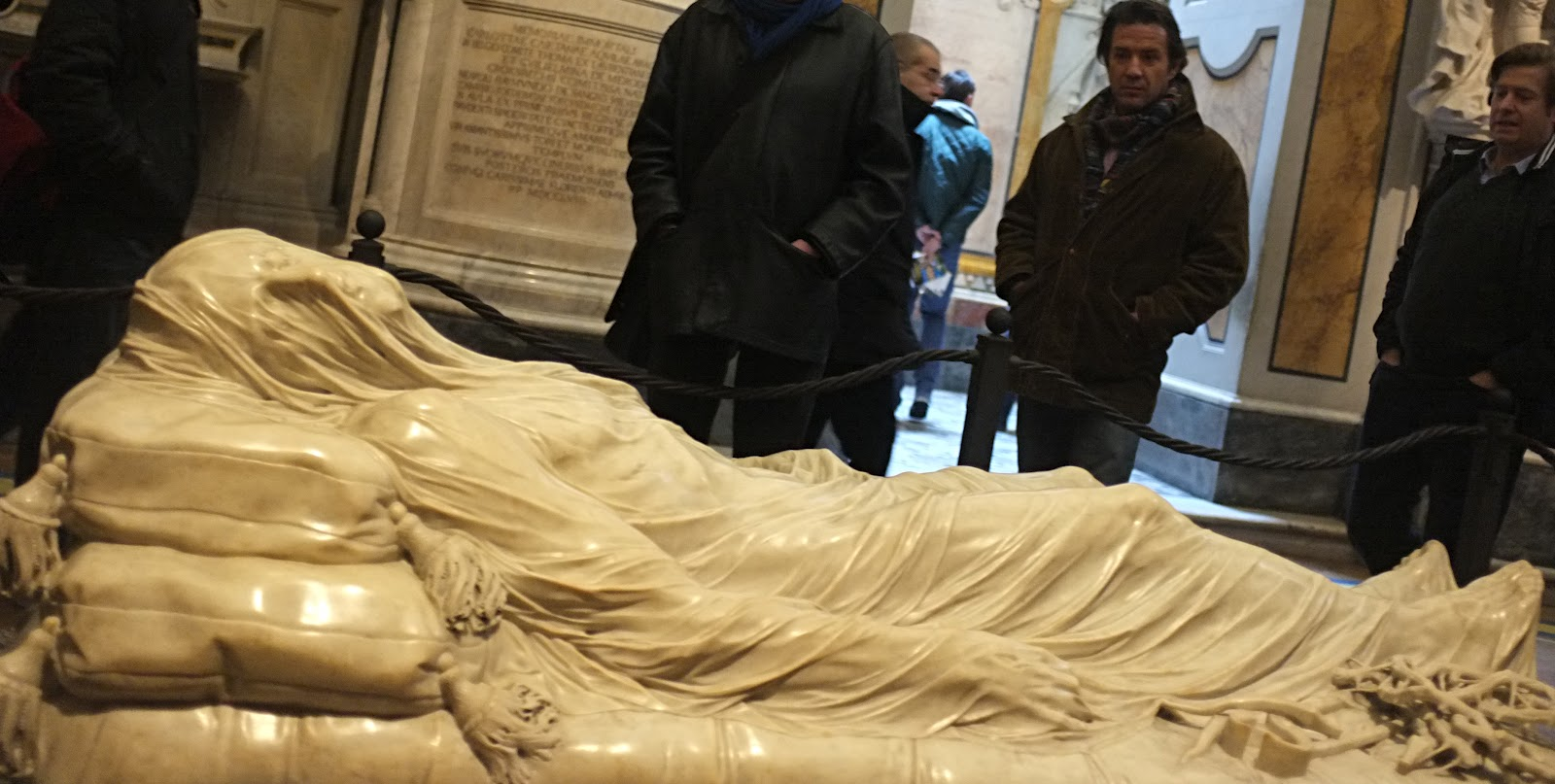
Veiled Christ, full statue

1. Monument to Cecco de' Sangro, Francesco Celebrano;
2. Monument to Giovan Francesco Paolo de' Sangro, Antonio Corradini;
3. Il decoro, Antonio Corradini;
4. Monument to Paolo de' Sangro, Bernardino Landini – Giulio Mencaglia;
5. La liberalità, Francesco Queirolo;
6. Monument to Duke Giovan Francesco Paolo de' Sangro, Giacomo Lazzari;
7. Lo zelo della religione, Fortunato Onelli;
8. Painting of Raimondo de' Sangro, Carlo Amalfi;
9. La soavità del giogo maritale, Paolo Persico;
10. Altar to St. Rosalia, Francesco Queirolo;
11. Veiled Truth (Pudicizia), Antonio Corradini;
12. Monument to Alessandro de' Sangro, Unknown artist, 18th century;
13. Angel, Paolo Persico;
14. Altar (La Deposizione), Francesco Celebrano and La Pietà (painting by unknown artist, 17th century);
15. Angel, Paolo Persico;
16. Coretto (little choir);
17. Release from Deception (Il Disinganno), Francesco Queirolo;
18. Altar to St. Odorisio, Francesco Queirolo;
19. La Sincerità, Francesco Queirolo;
20. Monument to Raimondo de' Sangro, Francesco Maria Russo;
21. Basement with anatomical models and painting by Giuseppe Pesce;
22. Il Dominio di sé stessi, Francesco Celebrano;
23. Monument to Paolo de' Sangro, Antonio Corradini;
24. L'Educazione, Francesco Queirolo;
25. Monument to Paolo de' Sangro, Giorgio Marmorano – Giacomo Lazzari;
26. Divine Love, unknown artist of the 19th century;
27. Monument to Giovan Francesco de' Sangro, Francesco Celebrano;
28. Veiled Christ, Giuseppe Sanmartino.

== Anatomical exhibits ==
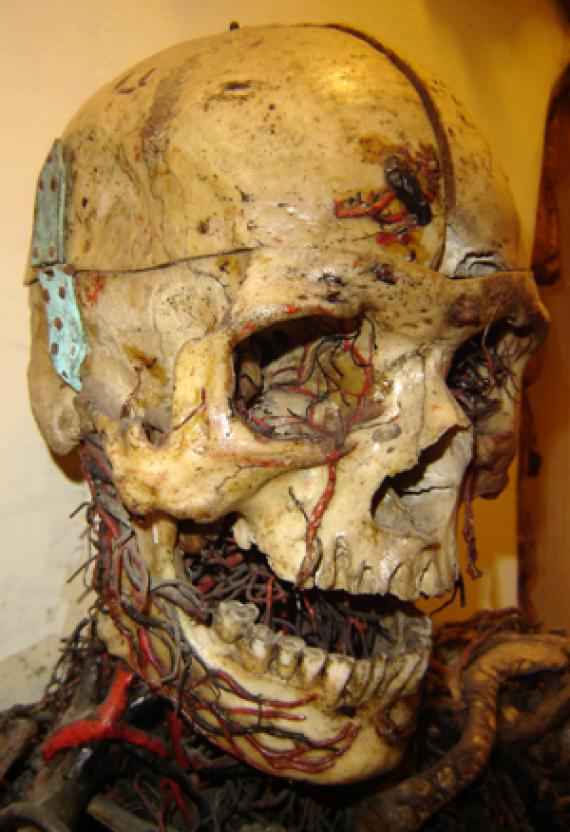
Head of the male model

The chapel also displays two early examples of what was long thought to be a form of plastination in its basement. These "anatomical machines" (macchine anatomiche) were thought to be examples of the process of "human metallization" (metallizzazione umana) as implemented by anatomist Giuseppe Salerno ca. 1760 from a commission by Raimondo di Sangro. The exhibit consists of a mature male and a pregnant woman. Their skeletons are encased in the hardened arteries and veins which are colored red and blue respectively. Previously, historians have surmised that the corpses could have been created by injecting the hardening substances directly into the veins of living subjects. However, recent analysis shows no evidence of techniques involving injection. Analysis of the "blood vessels" indicate they are constructed of beeswax, iron wire, and silk.
