= Vestal Virgin Tuccia (Corradini sculpture) =

Sculpture by Antonio Corradini

The Vestal Virgin Tuccia
- Veiled Woman
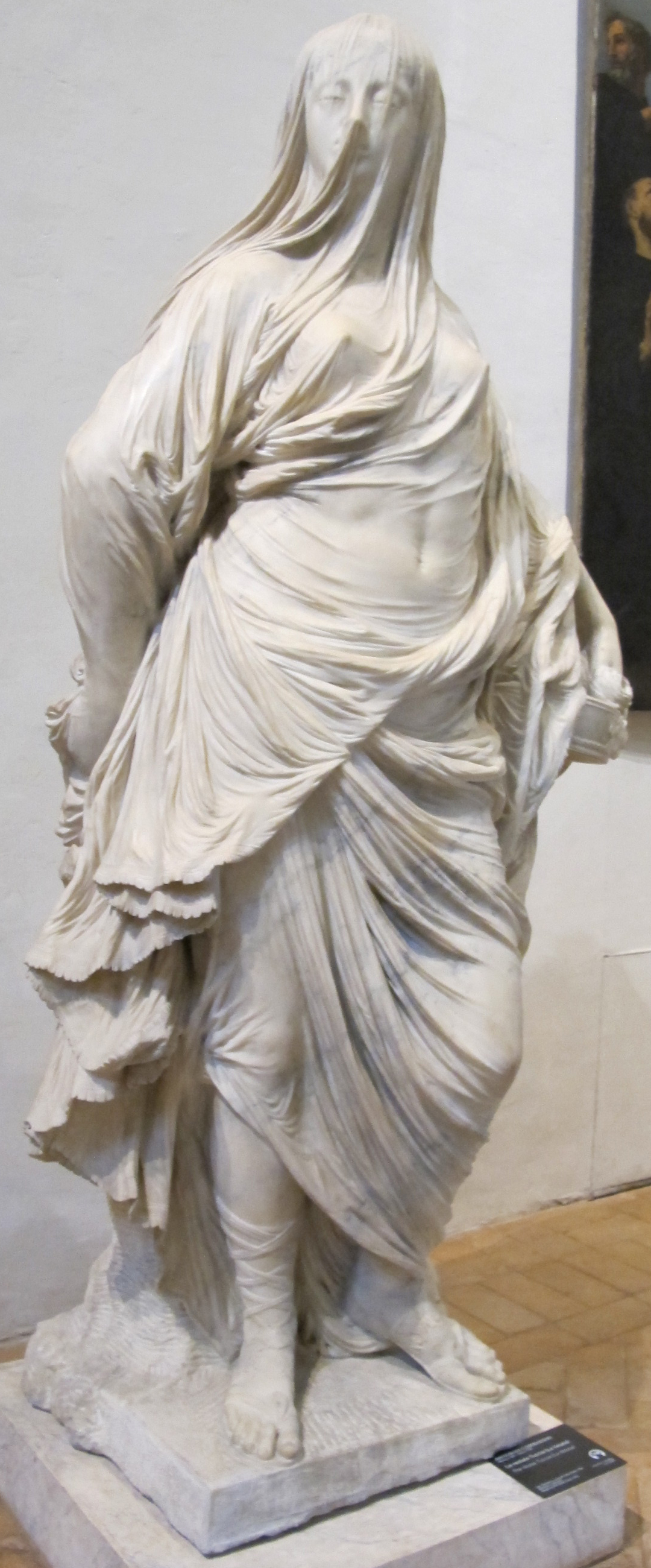
- Artist: Antonio Corradini
- Year: 1743
- Type: Sculpture
- Medium: Marble
- Dimensions: 230 cm (91 in)
- Location: Palazzo Barberini; Rome

The Vestal Virgin Tuccia (Italian: La Vestale Tuccia) or Veiled Woman (Italian: La Velata) is a marble sculpture created in 1743 by Antonio Corradini, a Venetian Rococo sculptor known for his illusory depictions of female allegorical figures covered with veils that reveal the fine details of the forms beneath. The work is housed in the Palazzo Barberini, Rome.

== Description and history ==
Corradini's subject is Tuccia, an ancient Roman Vestal Virgin who was wrongly accused of being unchaste. She proved her innocence by miraculously carrying water in a sieve from the Tiber River to the Temple of Vesta without spilling a drop. In Corradini's depiction, she holds the sieve on her left hip.

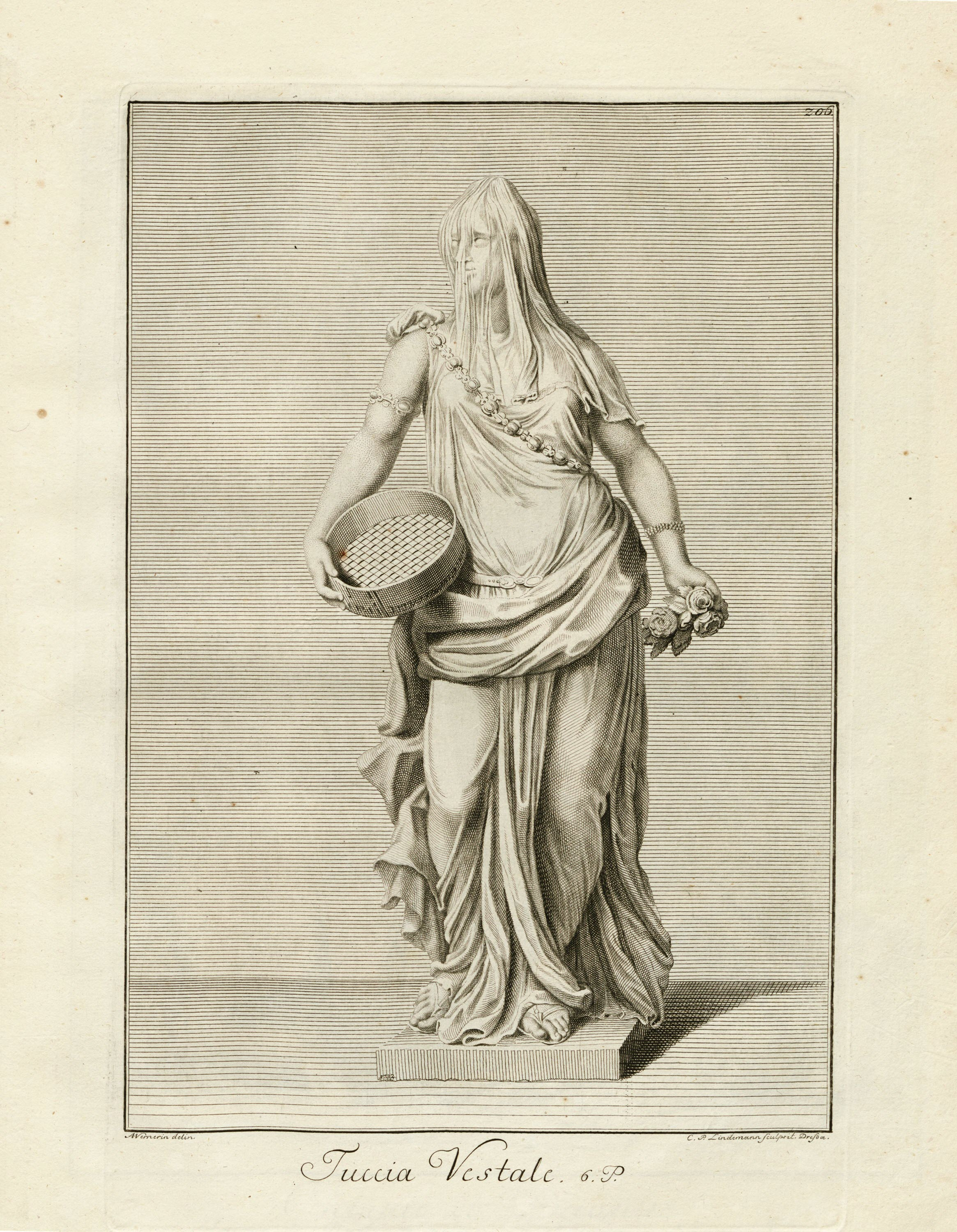
Engraving of a veiled Tuccia (1732) attributed to Corradini

The artist began working on Tuccia shortly after he arrived in Rome from Vienna. He must have been aware of the significance of Tuccia and Vestals to the city. In antiquity, a Vestal's virginity ensured the smooth functioning of the Roman Republic. If a Vestal were sexually active, her impure state actually posed a threat to the Republic, which is why unchaste Vestals were buried alive.

This effort was not the first time Corradini addressed the subject. In 1724 he sculpted a bust of a Vestal which today is a part of the collection of the Skulpturensammlung in Dresden. A 1733 portfolio of engravings illustrating sculptures in Dresden's Skulpturensammlung collection includes a picture of a veiled Tuccia, presumably by Corradini.

The completed sculpture was displayed in Corradini's studio near the Palazzo Barberini. There, it gained a good measure of notoriety and fame. The Jacobite pretender to the English throne, James Stuart, and Pope Benedict XIV both visited the studio to view the veiled Tuccia.

The work was never sold. When Corradini moved to Naples to begin work on the Cappella Sansevero, Tuccia remained at the Palazzo Barberini where it can be found today. Corradini's friend, the painter and caricaturist Pier Leone Ghezzi, offered an explanation: "the Roman lords" did not approve "out of envy".

== Symbolism and influence ==
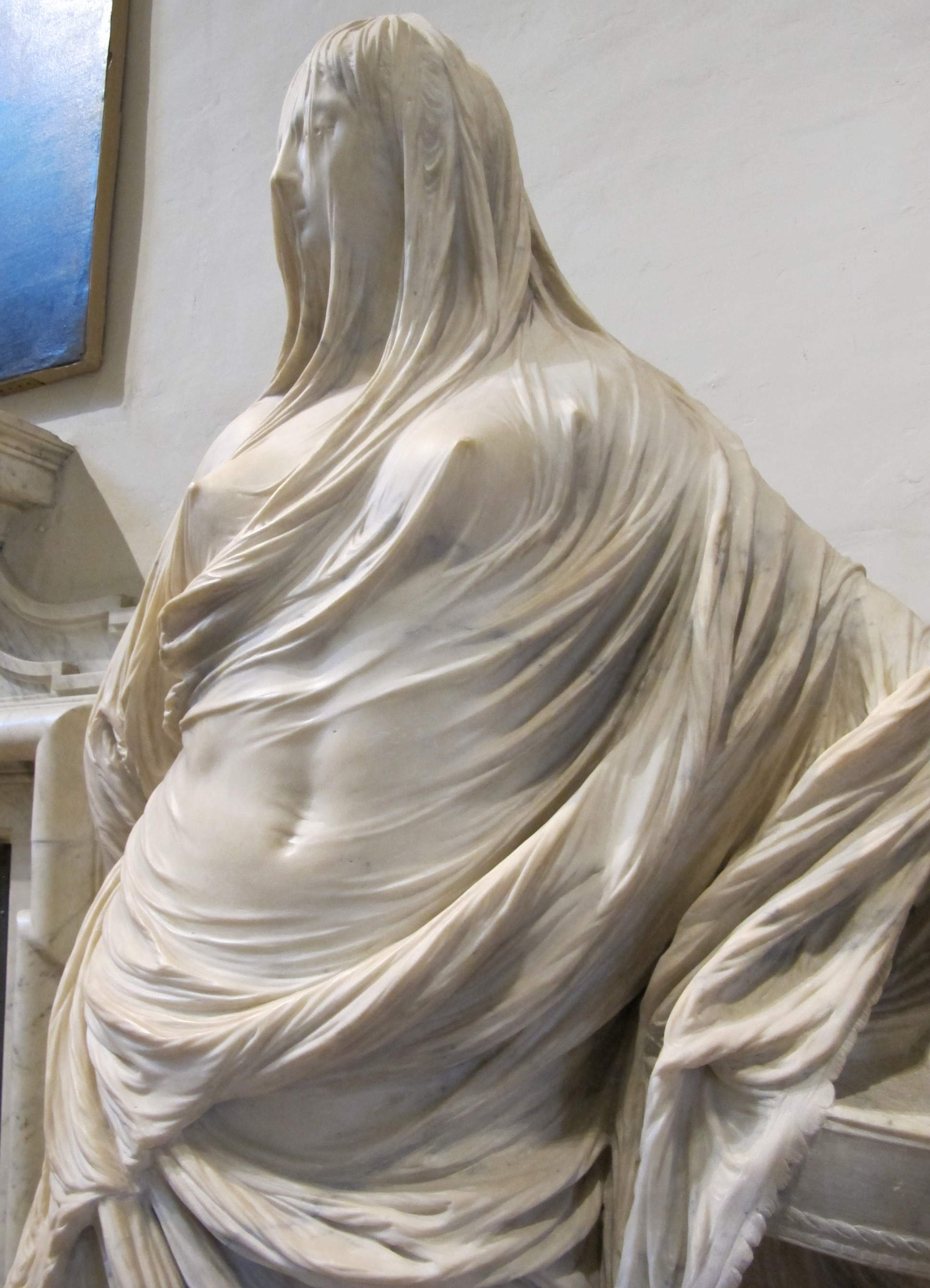
Detail of The Vestal Virgin Tuccia highlighting the illusion of diaphanous fabric clinging to flesh

There are three iconographic elements employed by Corradini in The Vestal Virgin Tuccia: the veil, the sieve, and the rose that she holds in her left hand. While it is appropriate to depict a Vestal with a veil, the shoulder-length veil called a suffibulum that covered the head but not the face of a Vestal bears little resemblance to the large clinging veils favored by the artist. Traditionally, veils are associated with modesty and chastity (e.g., in the Hebrew Bible, Rebecca covers herself with a veil before meeting Isaac). However, Corradini's treatment serves to highlight the flesh beneath the veil, in this case, her belly and breasts, which belies the theme he is purportedly portraying. Because of their association with Tuccia, sieves have always been associated with virginity. During the Renaissance, Queen Elizabeth I was famously depicted in a series of "sieve portraits" emphasizing her status as the "Virgin Queen". The iconography of roses is quite varied, ranging from victory and pride to love. In this context, the association with the purity of the Virgin Mary is probably the most apt.

Nearly a decade later in Naples, Corradini again used the elements of the veil and roses when crafting his last work, La Pudicizia (variously translated as Modesty or Chastity). Although the new sculptural group is more complex than Tuccia, the artist was creating La Pudicizia in the manner of Tuccia with a very similar transparent veil over the front of the subject's torso.

At the end of the 18th century, Innocenzo Spinazzi used Tuccia as his modello for a depiction of the Allegory of Faith commissioned for a chapel in Santa Maria Maddalena dei Pazzi in Florence. A similar contrapposto stance, twisted upper torso, and a long contour-hugging veil characterize the sculpture.

In the mid-19th century, there was a resurgence in popularity of the veiled woman motif after the example of Corradini partially due to the image of a veiled woman becoming an allegory for Italian unification. Artists including Giovanni Strazza, Raffaelle Monti, Pietro Rossi, and Giovanni Maria Benzoni contributed to the genre. Monti's kneeling Veiled Vestal represents a more modest approach to the Vestal Virgin subject.

=== Gallery of sculptures influenced by Tuccia ===
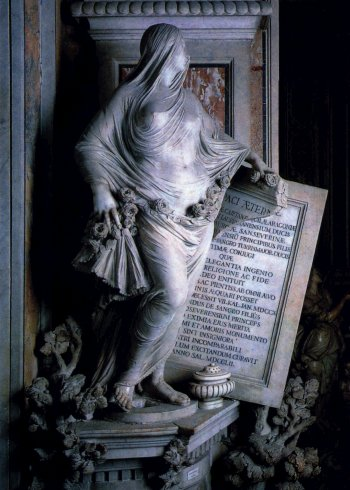
Corradini's La Pudicizia (1752) in the Cappella Sansevero, Naples

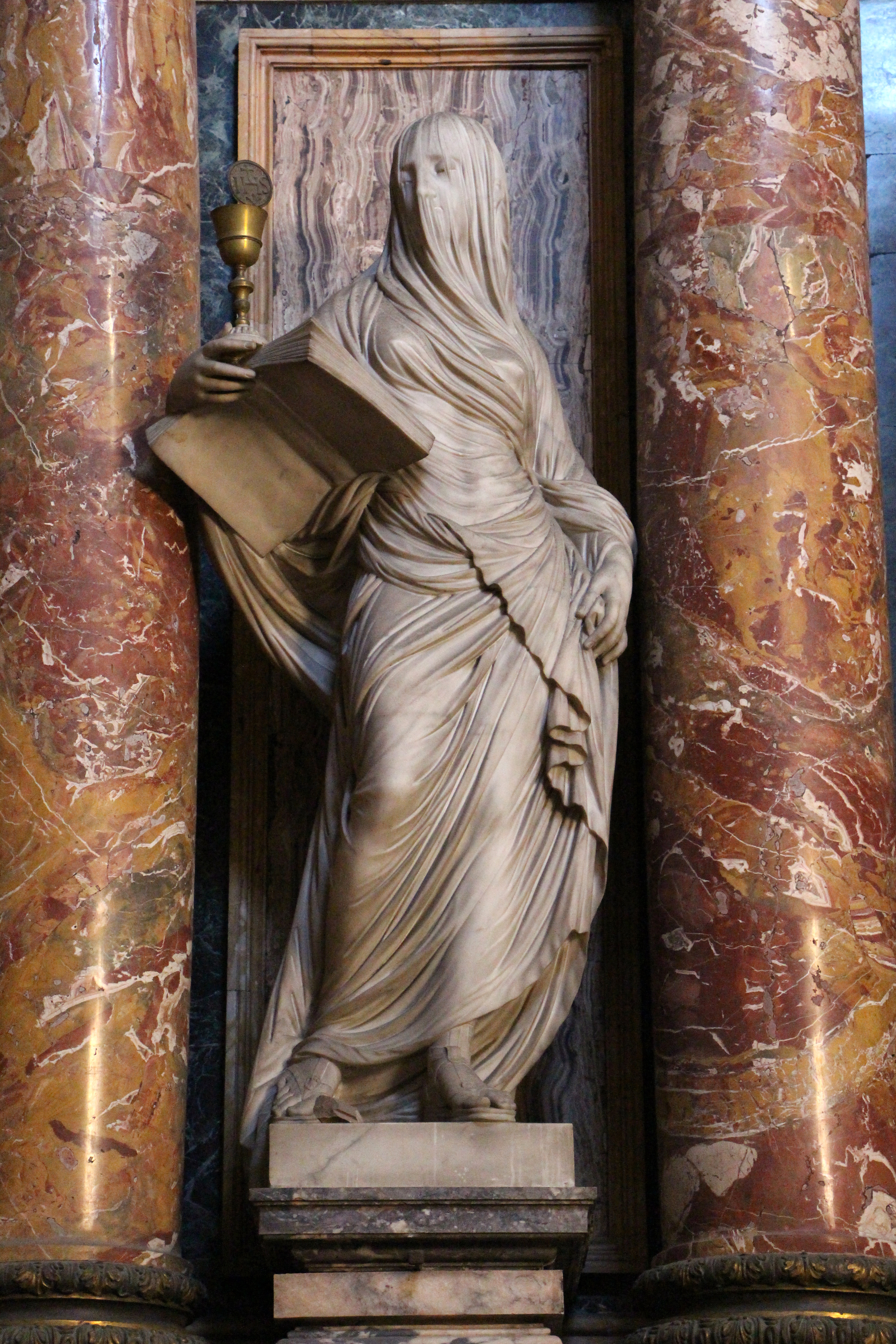
Spinazzi's Faith (1781) in the Santa Maria Maddalena dei Pazzi, Florence

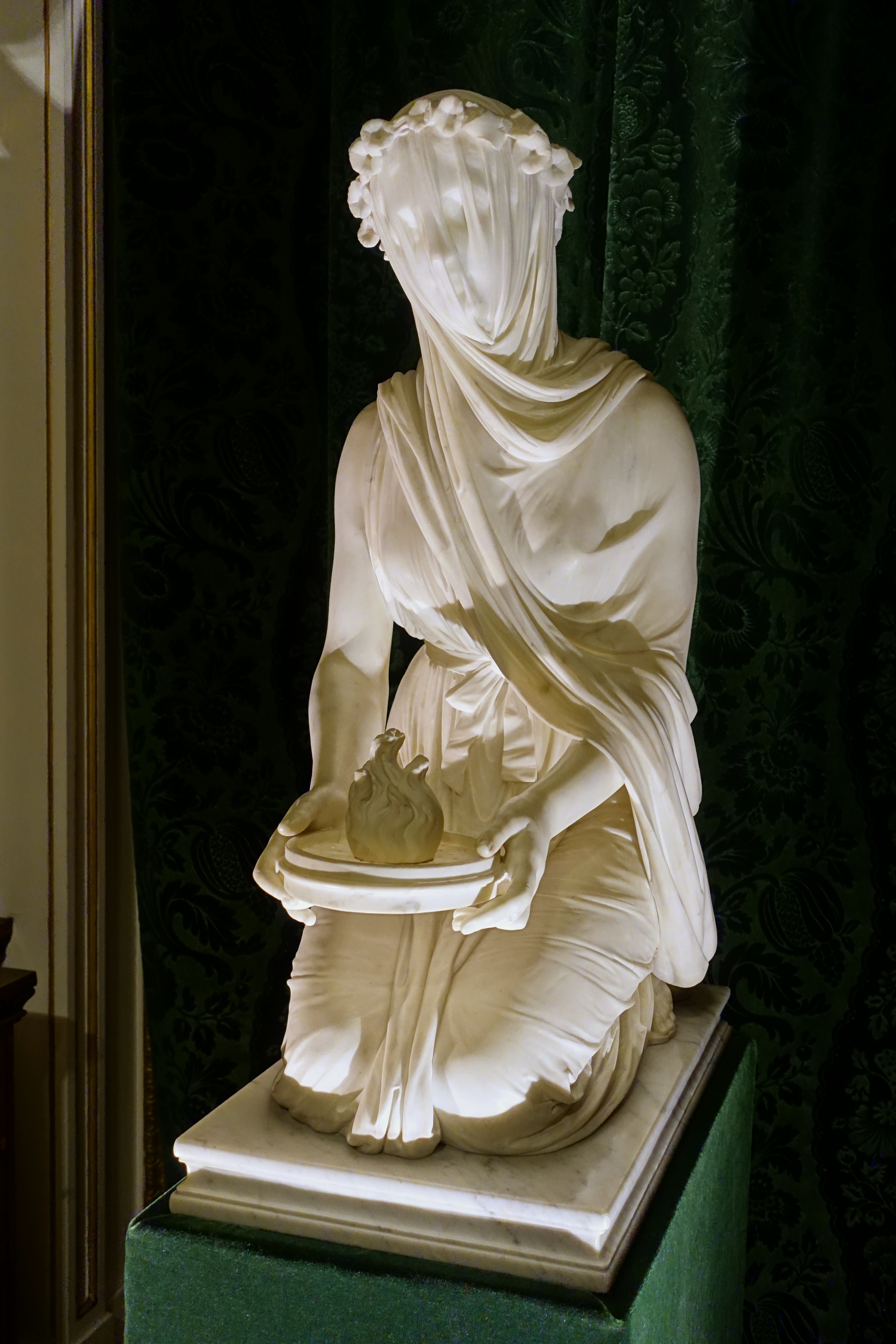
Monti's Veiled Vestal (1847) at Chatsworth House, Derbyshire

== See also ==
- Modesty, 1752 sculpture
- Veiled Christ, 1753 sculpture
- Veiled Vestal 1847 sculpture
- The Veiled Virgin, mid-19th century sculpture
- The Veiled Nun, c. 1863 sculpture
- Veiled Rebecca, 1863 sculpture
