= The Veiled Virgin =

Marble sculpture by Giovanni Strazza

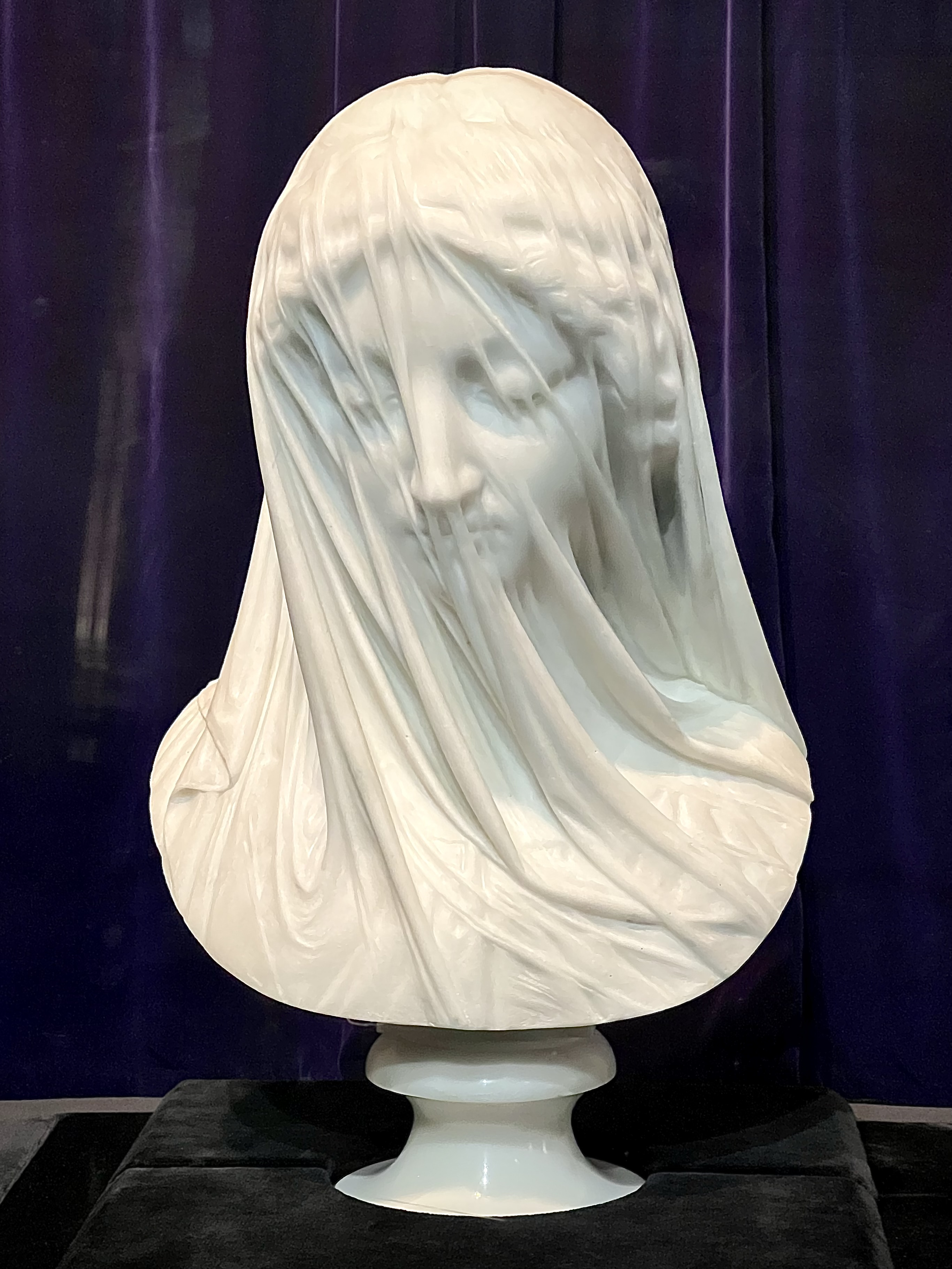
- Artist: Giovanni Strazza
- Year: Before 1856
- Type: Carrara marble
- Dimensions: 48 cm (19 in)
- Location: Presentation Convent, St. John's, Newfoundland, Canada

The Veiled Virgin is a Carrara marble statue carved in Rome by Italian sculptor Giovanni Strazza (1818–1875) depicting the bust of a veiled Virgin Mary. The exact date of the statue's completion is unknown, but it was probably in the early 1850s. The veil gives the appearance of being translucent, but is carved of marble. The technique is similar to Giuseppe Sanmartino's 1753 statue Veiled Christ in the Cappella Sansevero in Naples.

The statue was transported to Newfoundland in 1856, as recorded on December 4 in the diary of Bishop John Thomas Mullock: "Received safely from Rome, a beautiful statue of the Blessed Virgin Mary in marble, by Strazza. The face is veiled, and the figure and features are all seen. It is a perfect gem of art". It was then kept at the Bishop's Palace next to the Catholic Cathedral in St. John's until 1862, when Bishop Mullock presented it to Mother Mary Magdalene O'Shaughnessy, the Superior of the Presentation Convent. The bust has since remained under the care of Presentation Sisters, in Cathedral Square, St. John's.

In the context of the Risorgimento, the Veiled Virgin was intended to symbolize Italy.

Marble busts of veiled women were a popular theme among Strazza's contemporaries, the most important of whom were Pietro Rossi and Raffaele Monti.

== See also ==
- Vestal Virgin Tuccia, 1743 sculpture
- Modesty, 1752 sculpture
- Veiled Christ, 1753 sculpture
- Veiled Vestal 1847 sculpture
- The Veiled Nun, c. 1863 sculpture
- Veiled Rebecca, 1863 sculpture
