= The Veiled Nun =

Sculpture possibly after Giuseppe Croff

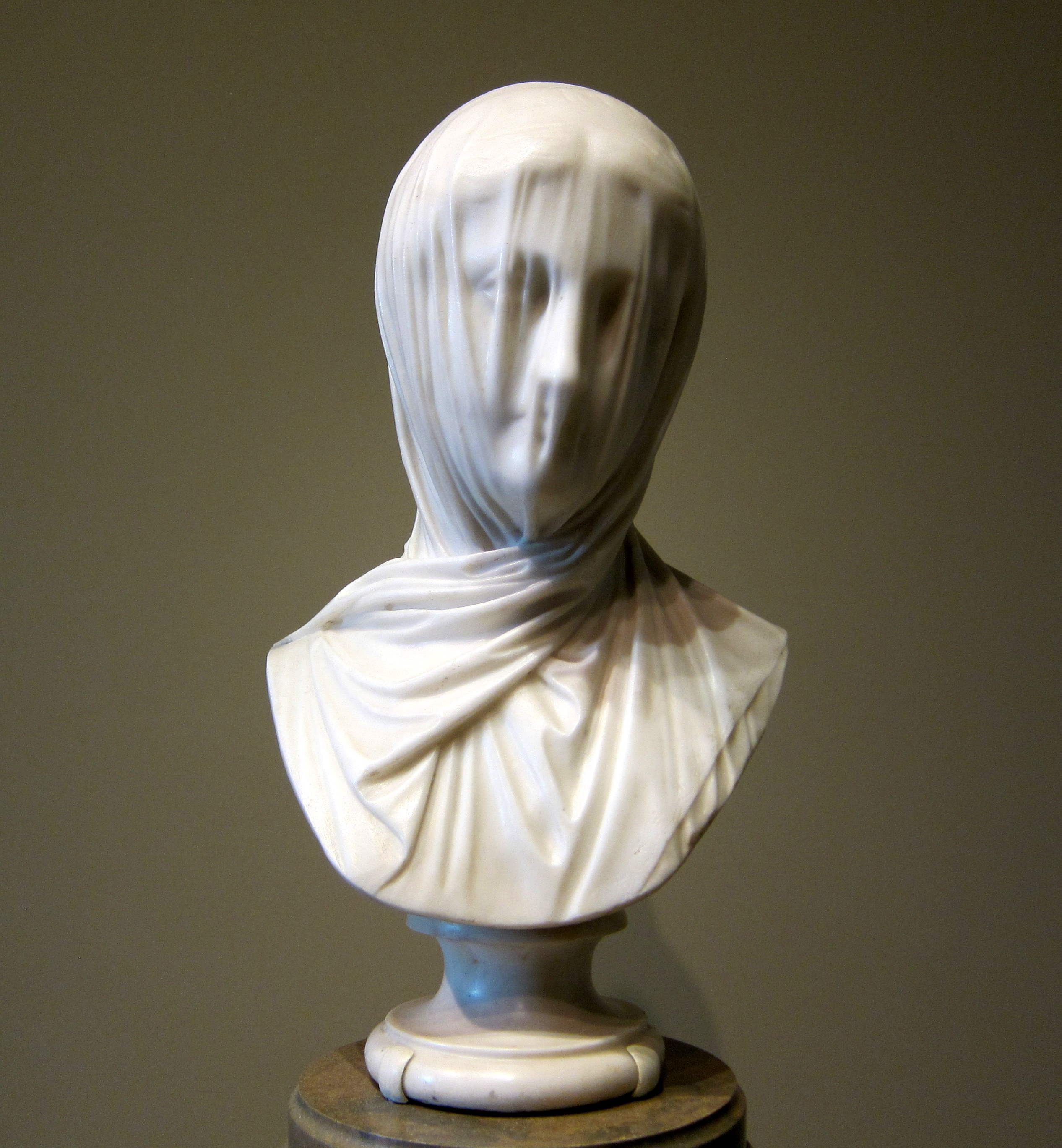
- Artist: Italian, 19th century Previously attributed to Giuseppe Croff
- Year: c. 1863
- Type: Sculpture
- Medium: Marble
- Dimensions: 20.75 in × 11.00 in × 9.50 in (52.71 cm × 27.94 cm × 24.13 cm)
- Location: National Gallery of Art; Washington, D.C.
- Owner: National Gallery of Art

The Veiled Nun is a marble bust depicting a female figure, sculpted by an unidentified Italian workshop c. 1863. Despite its name, the woman depicted is not a nun.

The bust was popular with visitors to the Corcoran Gallery of Art in Washington, D.C., from 1874 until the museum closed in 2014. The bust is held by the National Gallery of Art in Washington.

== Description ==
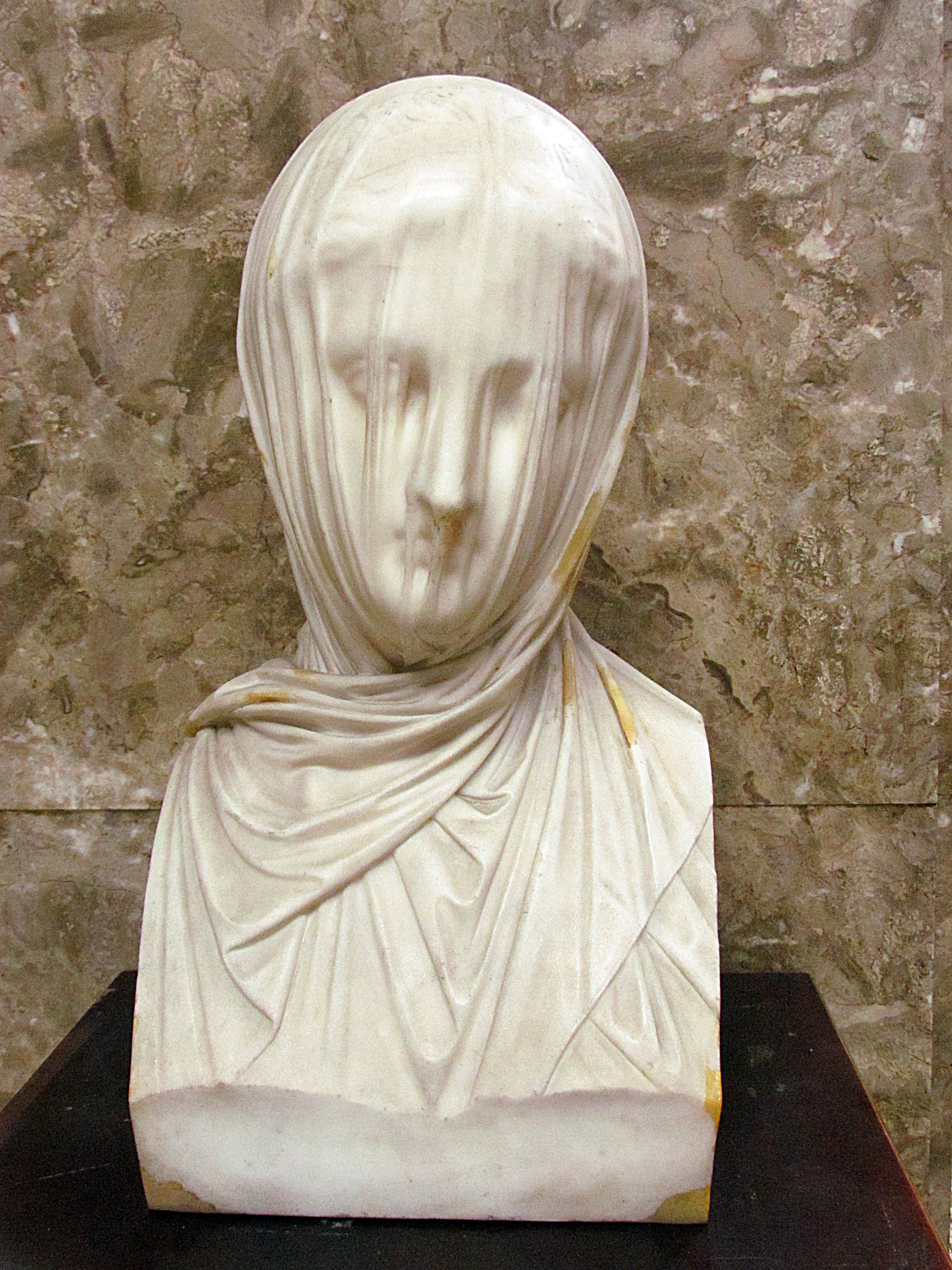
Similar bust displayed at the National Museum of Serbia

The Veiled Nun is a 20.75 in (52.7 cm) tall marble bust depicting a female figure wearing a veil. The fine details give the illusion that the veil is transparent. Although the title, The Veiled Nun, was already in use in 1874 when the work was first displayed in public, she is not a nun, but rather a woman of means or an allegorical figure. Neither the woman's stylish coiffure that is visible through the veil nor the embroidered border of the veil are consistent with a nun's appearance.

Sculptures depicting veiled figures were popular during the 19th century based on an Italian tradition that began in the 18th century. Notable examples include works by Antonio Corradini and Giuseppe Sanmartino in the Cappella Sansevero in Naples, and by the Florentine Innocenzo Spinazzi. In the 1850s, Raffaelle Monti of Milan crafted a Veiled Vestal, which may have influenced William Corcoran to name this bust The Veiled Nun.

Two other busts that appear to be derived from the same model are at the National Museum of Serbia and Laurier House in Ottawa, Ontario, Canada. Neither is signed.

== History and attribution ==
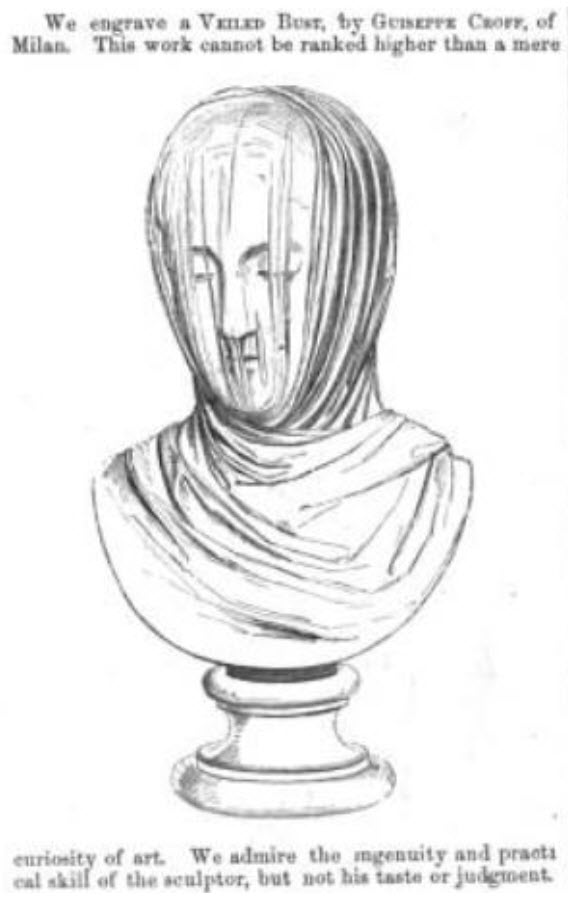
Engraved illustration of a Veiled Bust by Giuseppe Croff in a catalogue of the 1853 New York World's Fair

The bust was purchased for $300 in 1863 by American banker and art collector William Wilson Corcoran during a visit to Rome. It was a part of his private collection until he gave it to his museum, the Corcoran Gallery of Art. It was displayed in the Octagon Room of what is now the Renwick Gallery during the January 1874 opening exhibition of the Corcoran Gallery along with Hiram Powers' The Greek Slave.

For the next six decades, The Veiled Nun was listed as a copy of a bust by an unknown artist. This attribution was changed to the Milanese sculptor Giuseppe Croff (1810-1869) in 1939, when a patron pointed out a similarity with an engraved illustration of a bust by Croff in a catalogue of the 1853 New York World’s Fair. The Croff attribution remained until 2012 when the curator staff looked at a copy of the catalogue and noted significant differences between the works (the actual bust attributed to Croft cannot be located). Further analysis by experts led to a new attribution of an unknown commercial workshop in Rome.

The bust was one of the most popular artworks throughout its time at the museum. Following the Corcoran's dissolution in 2014, The Veiled Nun and 17,000 other works of art were accessioned by the National Gallery of Art.

== See also ==
- Vestal Virgin Tuccia, 1743 sculpture
- Modesty, 1752 sculpture
- Veiled Christ, 1753 sculpture
- Veiled Vestal 1847 sculpture
- The Veiled Virgin, mid-19th century sculpture
- Veiled Rebecca, 1863 sculpture
