= Veiled Rebecca =

1863 sculpture by Giovanni Maria Benzoni

The Veiled Rebecca
- Rebecca Velata (Italian)
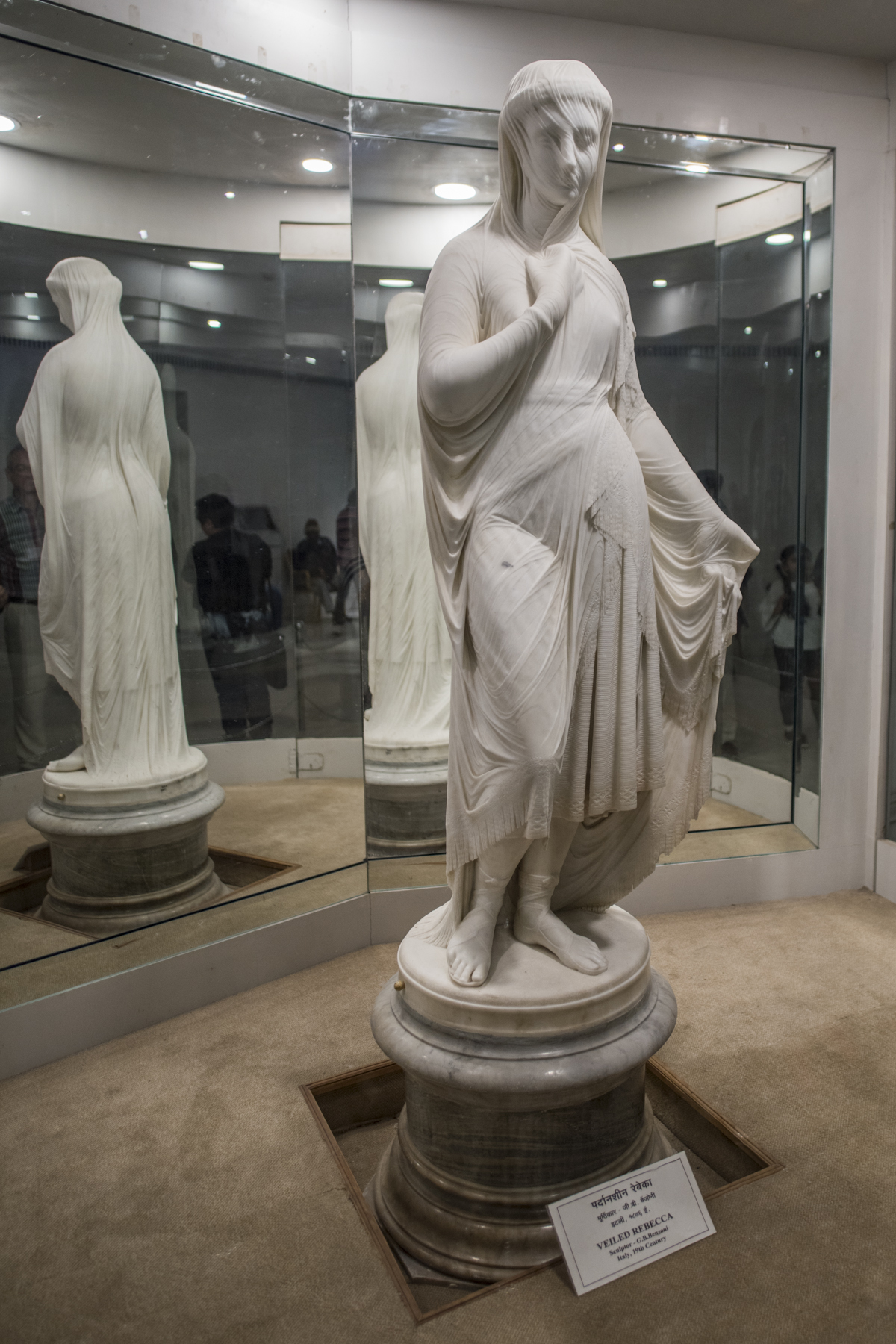
- The Veiled Rebecca displayed at the Salar Jung Museum, Hyderabad, India
- Artist: Giovanni Maria Benzoni
- Year: 1863
- Type: Sculpture
- Medium: Marble
- Dimensions: 160 cm × 58 cm × 50 cm (64 in × 23 in × 19.5 in)

The Veiled Rebecca (or The Veiled Rebekah, or The Veiled Lady) is a marble sculpture by Italian neoclassical style by the sculptor Giovanni Maria Benzoni in 1863. It depicts a biblical figure of Rebecca placed on a marble pedestal.

Originally several copies of the sculpture were made by Benzoni in two different sizes. Presently, location of five sculptures are identified - High Museum of Art in Atlanta, Georgia, listed in the catalog as The Veiled Rebekah and dated 1864, Berkshire Museum, Pittsfield, Massachusetts dated c. 1866, Detroit Institute of Arts, Detroit, Michigan (This smaller version (113 cm tall) is listed in the catalog as The Veiled Lady and dated 1872), Salar Jung Museum, Hyderabad, India. Dated 1876 (three years after Benzoni's death). Cedarhurst Center for the Arts, Mount Vernon, Illinois.) The one located in Detroit Institute of Arts, is the smaller version.

The statue was described in a 19th-century English art journal: "Benzoni, the fashionable Roman sculptor, whose studio has been visited by a number of crowned heads, exhibits in his suite of showrooms, several replicas in different sizes of his Diana, his veiled Rebecca before her meeting with Isaac, the 'Four Seasons', etc."

== Description ==
Benzoni executed principal version of the work in 1863 for Robert Henry Winttie of London.The sculpture depicts an Old Testament scene, where Rebecca lays eyes on her husband Isaac for the first time. Rebecca's head is bowed and her gaze is lowered as she secures her veil indicating demure modesty, although her other hand partially opens up in a welcoming gesture. The fringed veil drapes over her face, head and shoulder, and dangled unevenly above her feet. Her translucent attire further highlights the contour of her body. The illusion of a diaphanous veil and clinging dress created by the craftsmanship of Benzoni are the most noteworthy and skillful aspects of the sculpture.

== History ==
As per the records of a bulletin from Detroit Institute of Arts, Detroit Michigan, 37 versions of the composition was made in two sizes whereas Historical Dictionary of Neoclassical Art and Architecture by Alison Lee Palmer states that there are five copies of the sculpture. Location of the five versions of the statues mentioned by Alison Lee Palmer have been mentioned above.

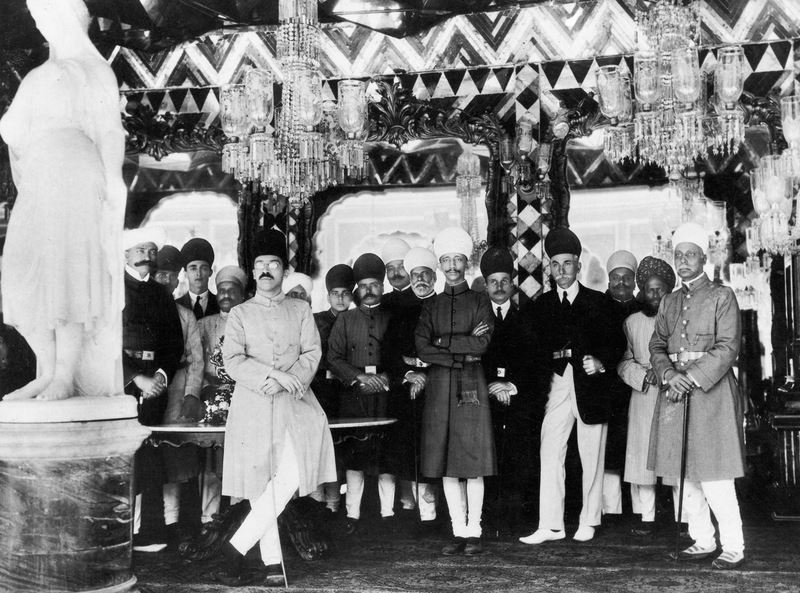
Mir Osman Ali Khan and Salar Jung III, along with various noblemen standing around the Veiled Rebecca, Diwan Deori

Salarjung I Mir Turab Ali Khan Bahadur acquired the sculpture during his trip to Rome when he also acquired the wooden sculpture Mephistopheles and Margaretta. The Veiled Rebecca was originally displayed in the Chini Khana inside the Dewan Devdi, Hyderabad. Chini Khana was a unique room, where all the walls were covered with antique Chinese plates, cups, saucers and silver plates displayed in shelves. In 1951, the Devdi was converted into Salarjung Museum and the sculpture stood in its original position, but in 1968, it was moved into the new Salarjung Museum and Dewan Devdi was gradually demolished over the years.

== Style ==
The Veiled Rebecca is an example of the neoclassical naturalist style, popular during the 19th century. The Veiled Lady, or Rebecca shows how Antonio Canova's and other Neoclassical sculptors' work had an influence on Benzoni as well as how well-versed he was in earlier eighteenth-century sculptural style. As Boström noted, veiled figures first appeared in post-classical art in the eighteenth century. Canova produced various female figures with translucent attire and drapes in the nineteenth century, including Hebe. Later Milanese sculptor Raffaelle Monti created Seated Veiled Woman displayed at London's Great Exhibition of 1851 and then Veiled Woman in 1854 to continued to explore this veiled female form. Benzoni was acquainted with Monti and was present in London in 1851.

Veiled women were a popular sculptural motif among Benzoni and his peers in 19th-century Italy for a number of reasons. The first was that these works highlighted the artistry of the sculptor since achieving the illusion that stone is fabric clinging to a body requires a high level of skill. Secondly, a veiled woman had become an allegory for Italian unification.

== Gallery ==
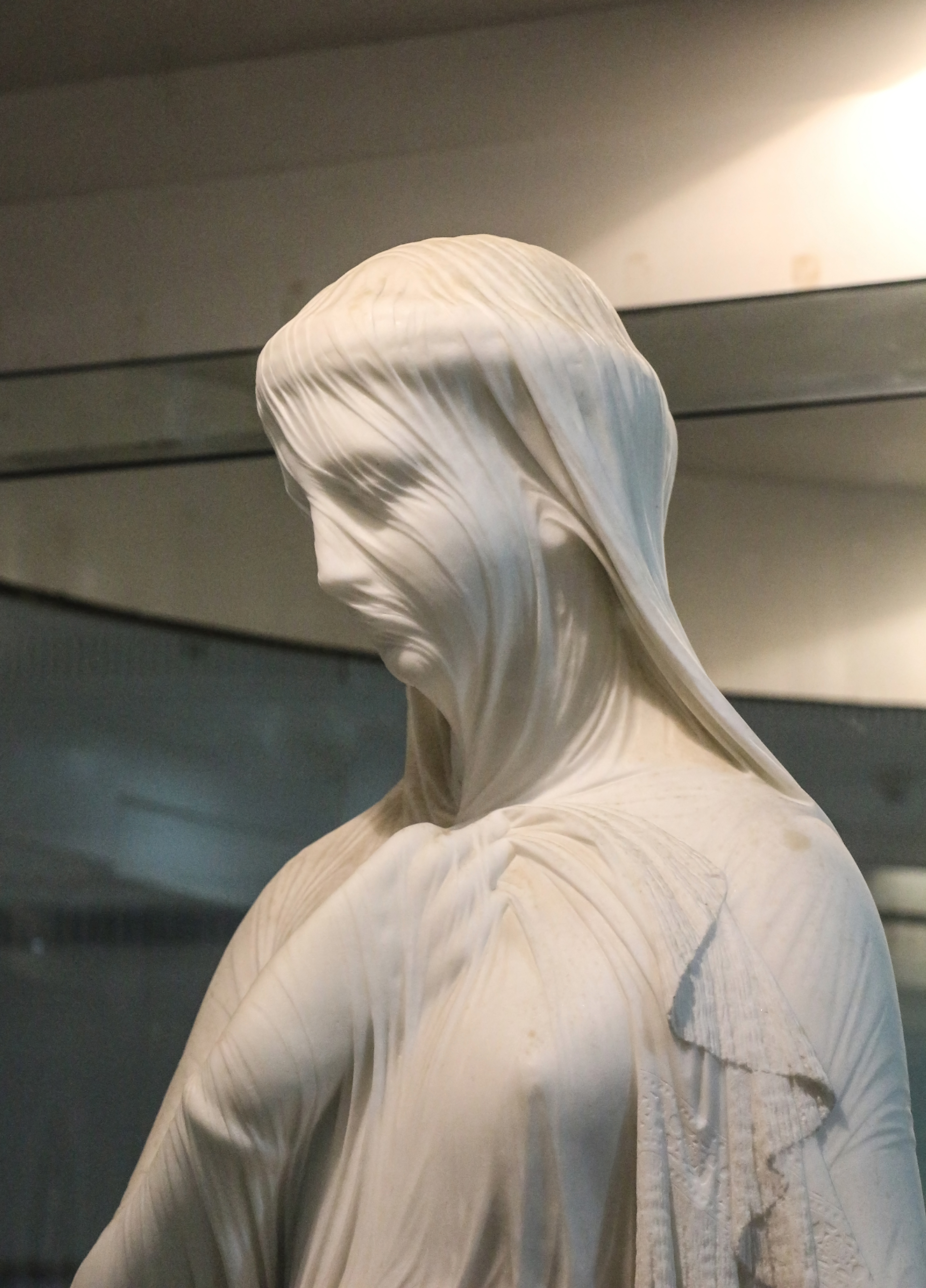
Detail of the statue at the Salar Jung Museum

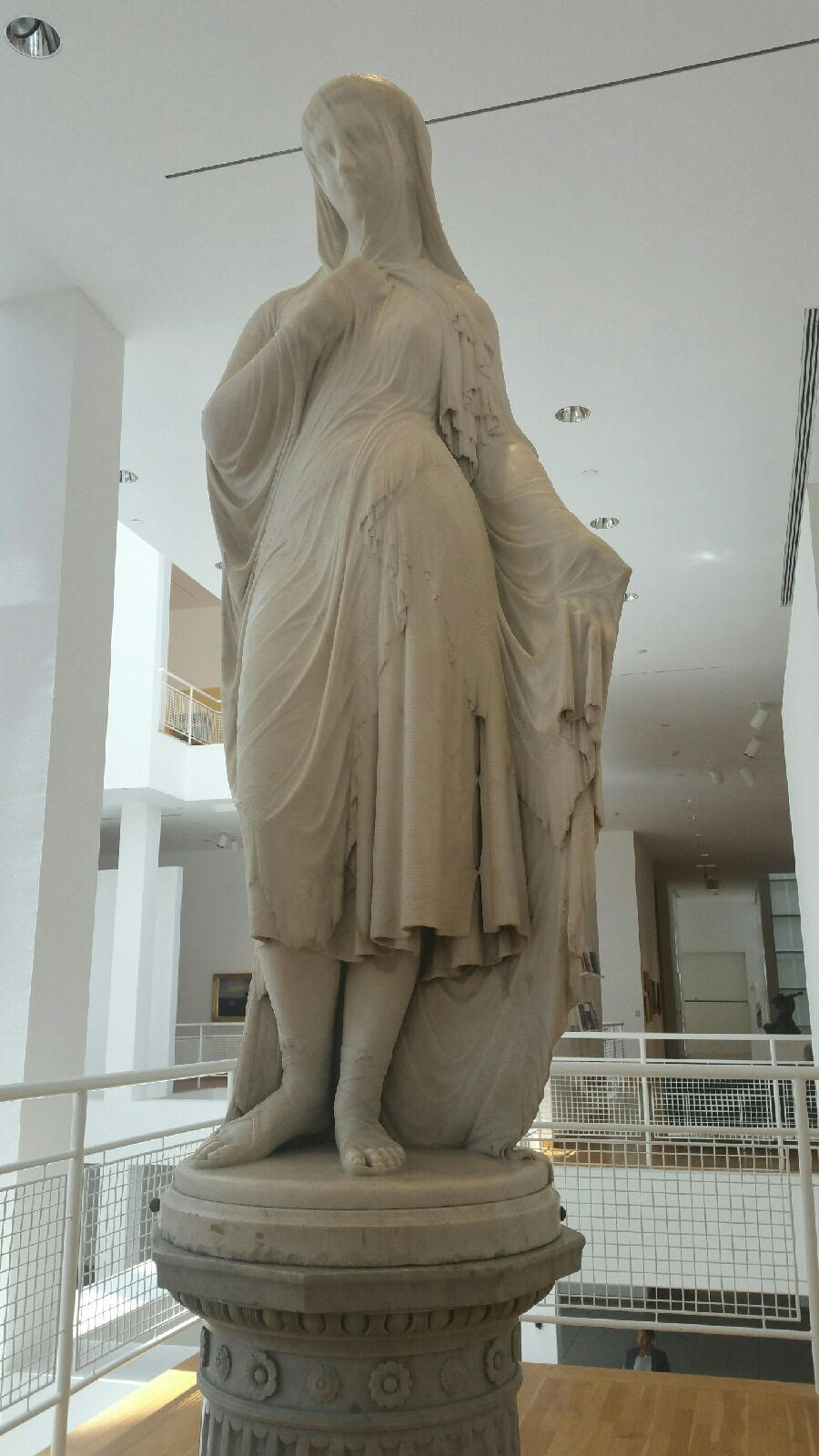
The Veiled Rebekah at the High Museum of Art

== See also ==
- Vestal Virgin Tuccia, 1743 sculpture
- Modesty, 1752 sculpture
- Veiled Christ, 1753 sculpture
- Veiled Vestal 1847 sculpture
- The Veiled Virgin, mid-19th century sculpture
- The Veiled Nun, c. 1863 sculpture
