= Veiled Christ =

Sculpture by Giuseppe Sanmartino

Coordinates: 40.84919°N 14.25488°E

- Cristo Velato (Italian)
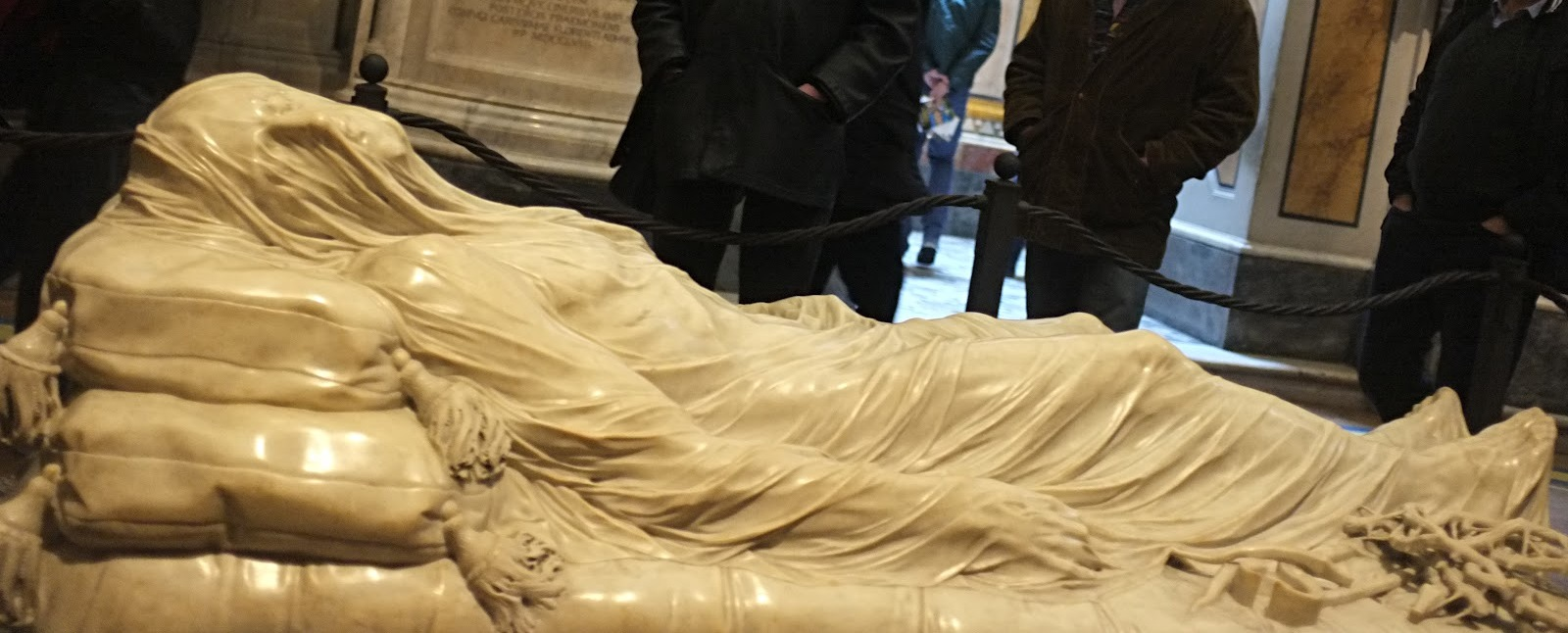
- Artist: Giuseppe Sanmartino
- Year: 1753
- Type: Sculpture, tomb effigy
- Medium: Marble
- Dimensions: 50 cm × 80 cm × 180 cm (20 in × 31 in × 71 in)
- Location: Cappella Sansevero, Naples, Italy

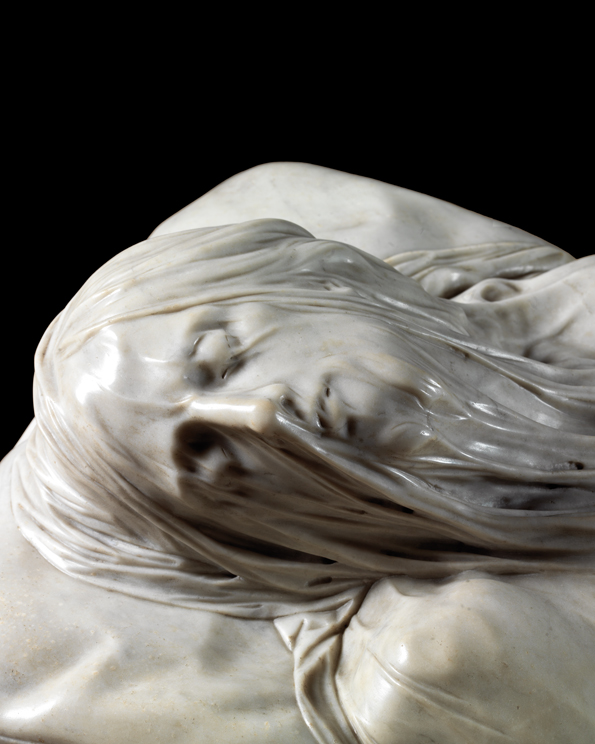
Detail of Jesus's head and veil

Veiled Christ (Italian: Cristo velato) is a marble tomb effigy completed in 1753 by the Neapolitan artist Giuseppe Sanmartino. Carved from a single block of white marble, it depicts the body of Christ covered by a revealing translucent shroud or veil with objects from his crucifixion near his feet. The work was commissioned by Raimondo di Sangro, a prince of Sansevero, as the centrepiece of the Cappella Sansevero in Naples, Italy, and its complex carving caused many to believe it was created by alchemy.

The 18th-century sculptor Antonio Canova tried to acquire the work, stating that he would willingly give ten years of his life to have produced something of similar quality.

== History and description ==
In 1753, a rich nobleman named Raimondo di Sangro was funding the restoration of a church in Naples called the Cappella Sansevero. He commissioned the sculptor Antonio Corradini to produce the centrepiece of the church: a realistic, life-sized marble tomb effigy of Jesus covered by a shroud. Corradini produced a terracotta bozzetto model, now in the Museo Nazionale di San Martino, but died shortly after.

The commission passed to a young Italian sculptor named Giuseppe Sanmartino. He was charged with producing "a marble statue sculpted with the greatest realism, representing Our Lord Jesus Christ in death, covered by a transparent shroud carved from the same block of stone as the statue."

Adapting Corradini’s model, Sanmartino produced a sculpture of the dead Jesus lying on a couch and covered by a veil which adheres perfectly to his body. The mastery of the Neapolitan sculptor lies in the way the veil reveals the suffering that Jesus had undergone during the crucifixion. Signs of Jesus's pain can be seen on his face and body.

Sanmartino carved the instruments of the passion at Jesus's feet, including pliers, shackles, and the crown of thorns.

The new sculpture was placed in the centre of the nave, where it still lies. It was highly praised, and helped launch Sanmartino's career.

== Legend of the veil being produced by alchemy ==
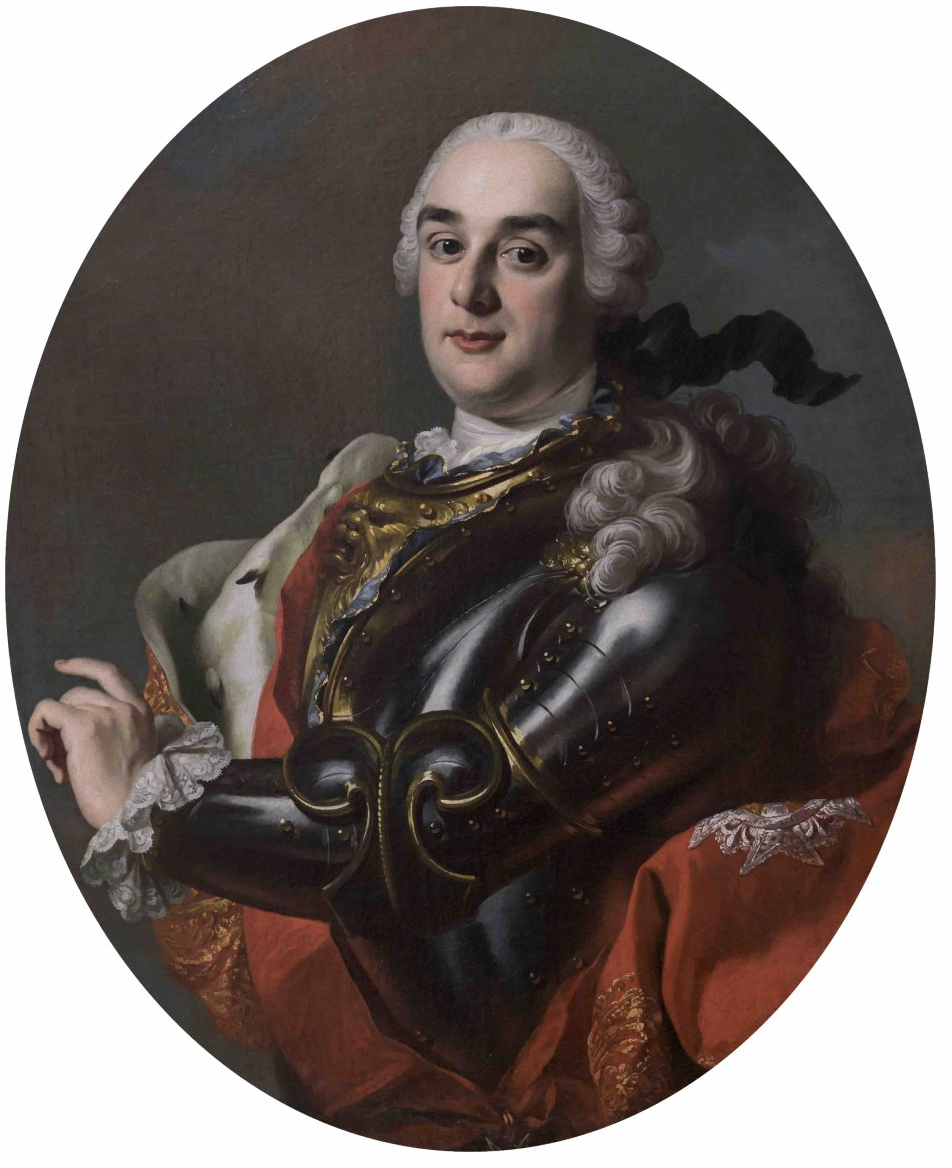
Raimondo di Sangro

When the sculpture was put on display many visitors to the Cappella were amazed by the illusion of the veil which transformed solid marble into a medium which seemed both wet and transparent. The man who commissioned the work, Prince Raimondo di Sangro, was a writer, soldier, and scholar intrigued by the mysteries of the cosmos. He was also a student of alchemy, an ancient and secretive philosophical tradition which focused on the search for eternal life and for the means to transmute base metals into gold.

Some visitors surmised that the prince had draped the underlying figure with a real veil which he then transformed into marble by means of a secret alchemical process.

In fact, this sculptural effect was an old one: the earliest “veiled statues” date from classical times. Indeed, the technique was prized in European high-art circles in the 1700s when di Sangro was rebuilding the chapel.

== See also ==
- List of statues of Jesus
- Vestal Virgin Tuccia, 1743 sculpture
- Modesty, 1752 sculpture
- Veiled Vestal 1847 sculpture
- The Veiled Virgin, mid-19th century sculpture
- The Veiled Nun, c. 1863 sculpture
- Veiled Rebecca, 1863 sculpture

== Sources ==
- Albright, Thomas. "The Veiled Christ of Cappella Sansevero: On Art, Vision and Reality". Leonardo, Volume 46, Issue 1, February 2013.
- Bussagli, Marco. Sansevero Chapel and the Veiled Christ in Naples. Bologna: Scripta Maneant, 2019. ISBN 978-88-9584-781-8
- Catello, Elio. Giuseppe Sanmartino (1720-1793). Napoli, Electa, 2004
- Draper, James David. Playing With Fire: European Terracottas, 1740-1840. NY: Metropolitan Museum of Art, 2004.
- Istvan, Rachel."The Veiled Christ: Art or Alchemy?" Daily Art Magazine 5 April 2026
