= Modesty (Corradini sculpture) =

Sculpture by Antonio Corradini

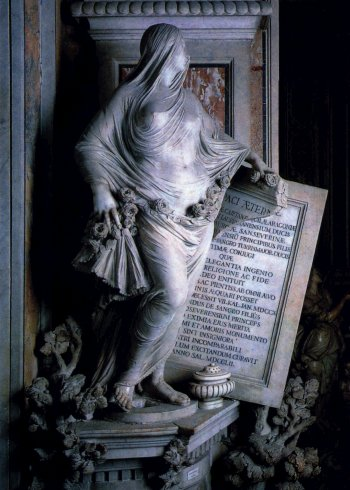
- Artist: Antonio Corradini
- Year: 1752
- Medium: Marble
- Location: Cappella Sansevero, Naples

Modesty or Chastity (Italian: La Pudicizia) or Veiled Truth by Antonio Corradini is a sculpture completed in 1752 during the Rococo period. Raimondo di Sangro commissioned Corradini to sculpt a memorial for his mother in the Cappella Sansevero in Naples, where the marble sculpture still stands.

== About the work ==
Corradini worked mostly in Venice but also spent some time in Vienna and Naples before his death in 1752. Modesty was the last in Corradini's series of veiled female nudes, a subject he developed and refined throughout his career. His mastery of marble is evident in the increasingly skilled representation of seemingly weightless cloth over human flesh in his commissioned pieces. Raimondo wanted this commemoration to depict his mother's untimely death when he was not even a year old.

An image of this statue is painted on the wall of a high building in Naples.

== Visual features ==
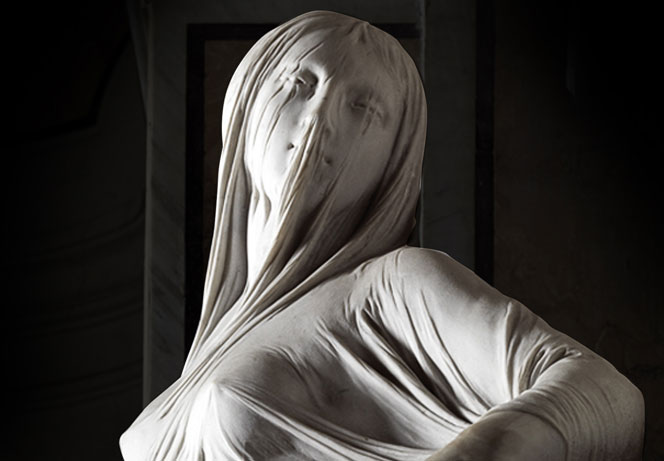
Detail

The figure stands in a contrapposto stance, with more weight on one foot than the other. This pose gives her human-like qualities and a sense of motion, as if she is in the middle of an action. The way her classical drapery falls on her body also shows this movement. Artists in eighteenth-century Italy were especially interested in depicting movement, as Corradini was. Her face is turned away from the viewer, shielding her eyes with the transparent veil. The veil seems heavy but also see-through. It falls just so over her chest to accentuate her breasts, but also covers her pubic area so that it is not overtly sexual. She is exposed yet metaphorically shielded by the drapery. Her supple body is fluid, a smooth and perfect human. These idealised qualities suggest she is a divine woman, not of this world.

== Sansevero Chapel ==
Modesty is one of two sculptures Corradini completed for the Sansevero Chapel, both part of a ten-statue series of the Virtues. The veiled female figure embodies modesty but can also be considered a representation of wisdom. There is a clear reference to the veiled statue of Isis at Sais in Egypt. It is said that there is a quote on the ancient statue that reads "I am past, present, and future…". This allegory furthers Modesty's aspect of wisdom and the statue is often referred to as Veiled Truth. Symbols such as the cracked plaque illustrate her life being cut too short. On the pedestal that the statue stands on, there is a relief of a biblical scene of Christ appearing to Mary Magdalene as a gardener, portraying the importance of the Christian faith to the family. Corradini's other work is Decorum, which is also in the series of virtues. Decorum is a depiction of a youthful male nude scantily clothed in lion skin. He was also commissioned to make the piece Veiled Christ for the chapel but it was completed by Giuseppe Sanmartino instead when Corradini died suddenly. His two statues line the wall of Sansevero along with eight others. Modesty is positioned in its original location giving viewers the ability to see the statue in its intended arrangement.

== Patronage ==
This series of virtues was commissioned by Raimondo di Sangro who was the seventh Prince of Sansevero. Patronage is imperative in the art world and is meant to convey the visions of the person paying for the artwork. Raimondo was known for his interest in science and the arts. Raimondo acquired the church in the mid eighteenth century and transformed it into what is seen today. He was very particular about his ideas for the mausoleum and hired what he thought were the best artists to work on it. The visual theme of the Rococo movement is seen in the adorned building with a painted ceiling, marble tombs and relief sculptures.

== Veiled figures ==
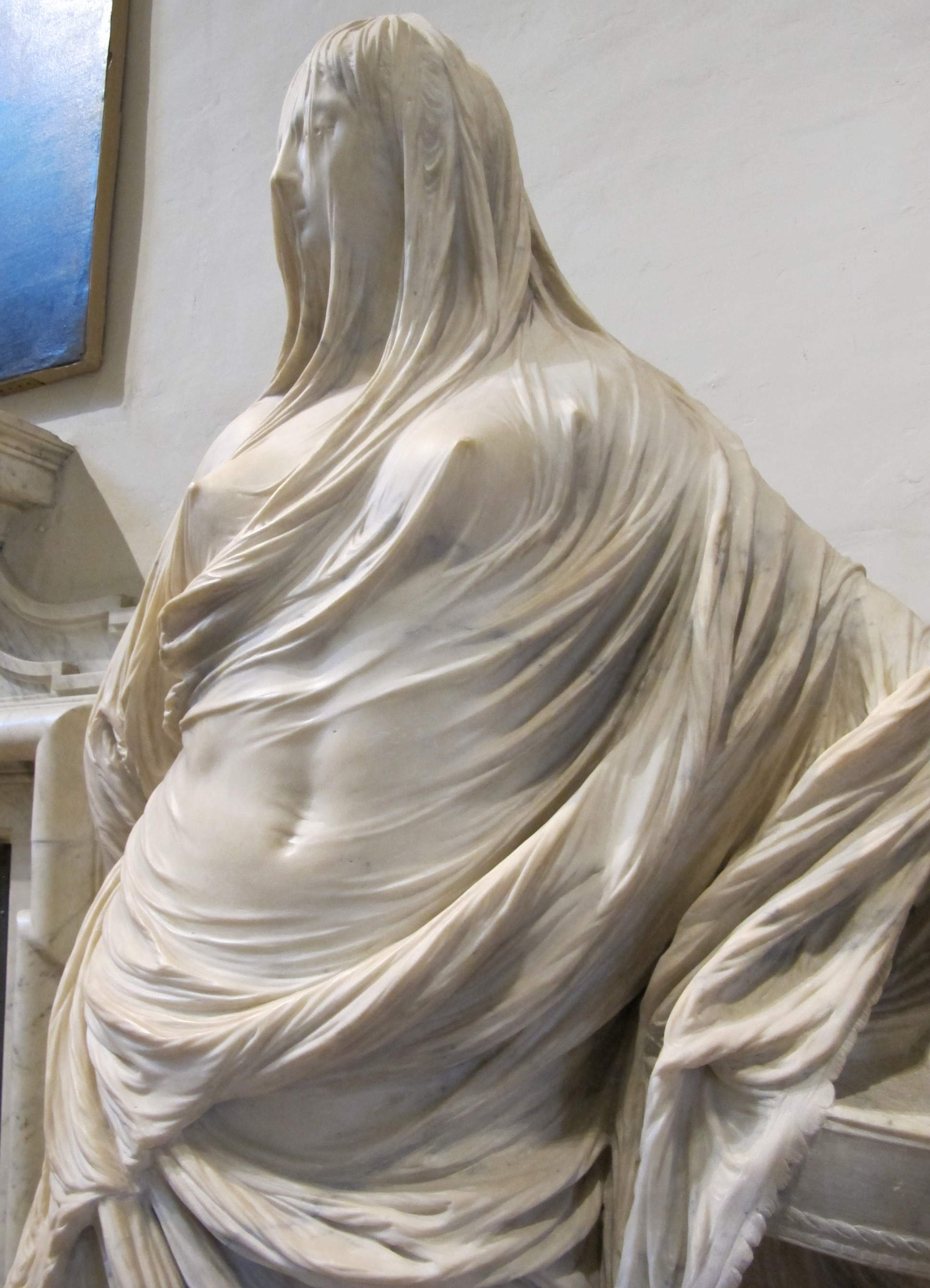
Corradini's Vestal Virgin Tuccia in the Palazzo Barberini

Corradini's interest in the veiled human form spanned his long career. His subjects were usually women and often allegorical. Early in his career, his works depicted heavily draped figures in a classical manner and then progressed to a thin, translucent layer of marble acting as a veil as he perfected his craft. An example of the latter and the work on which Corradini based Modesty is his Vestal Virgin Tuccia, sculpted in Rome in 1743.

== See also ==
- Pudicitia
- Veil of Isis
- Vestal Virgin Tuccia, 1743 sculpture
- Veiled Christ, 1753 sculpture
- Veiled Vestal 1847 sculpture
- The Veiled Virgin, mid-19th century sculpture
- The Veiled Nun, c. 1863 sculpture
- Veiled Rebecca, 1863 sculpture
