= Giosuè Argenti =

Italian sculptor (1819–1901)

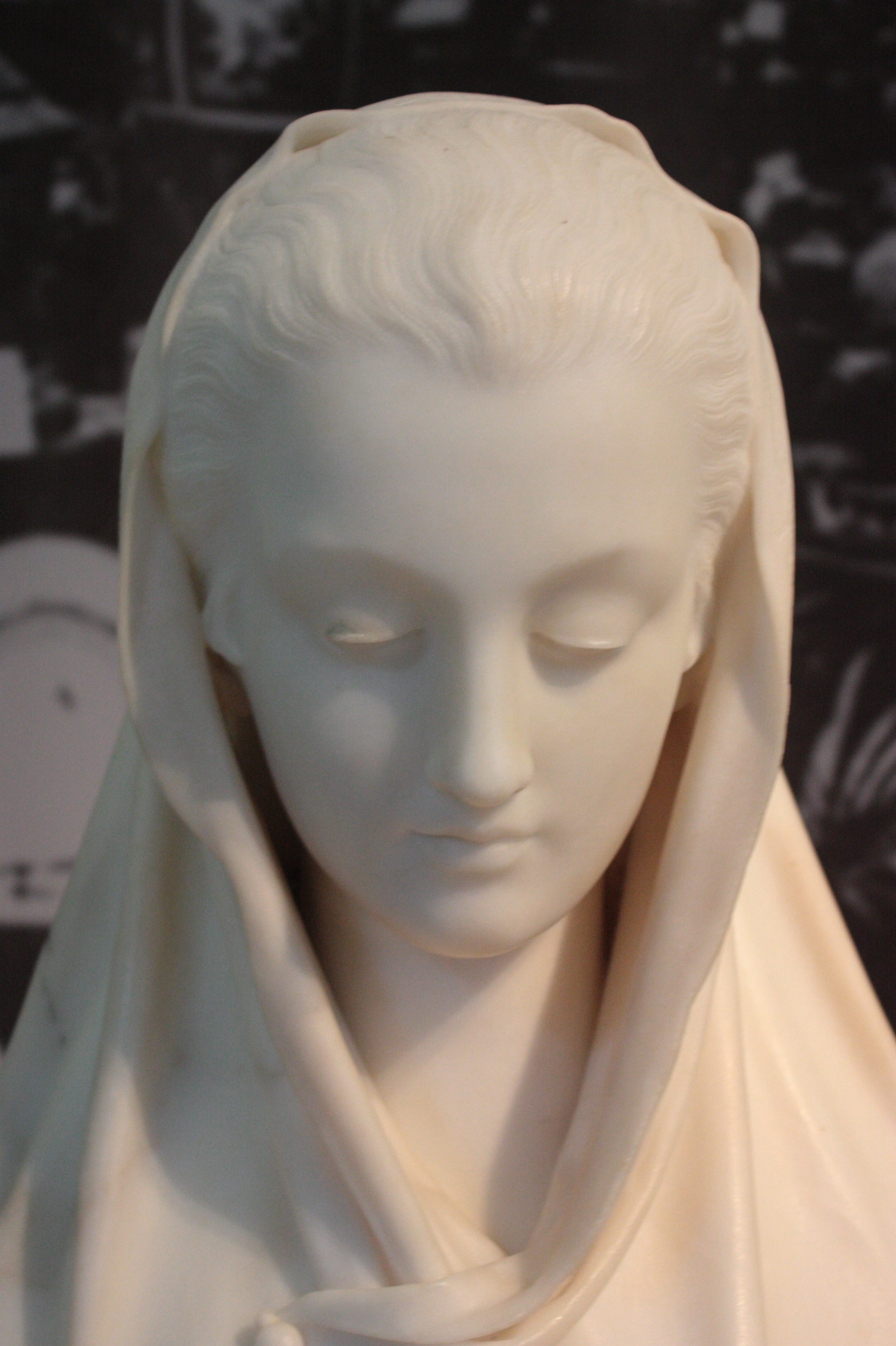
Modesty by G Argenti 1866

Giosuè Argenti (February 7, 1819 in Viggiù, Province of Varese – November 29, 1901) was an Italian sculptor.

== Life ==
He trained at the Accademia di Belle Arti of Milan, where he worked along with Abbondio Sangiorgio, Francesco Somaini, Benedetto Cacciatori, and the painter Luigi Sabatelli. His most influential teacher at the academy was Pompeo Marchesi. After six years of study in Rome, winning stipends to pay for his stay, he returned to the academy in Milan. Argenti was passed the "Sculpture Chair" at the Brera Academy from Giovanni Strazza in 1875.

Among his works are: group of five figures representing La Salute for Villa Mylius at Loveno on Lago di Como; an aedicule with statue representing Charity conducting an orphan at Cimitero Maggiore of Milan; monument with statue representing Beneficence accompanying a blind child bringing a crown, also at the cemetery, dedicated to a benefactor of the Institute for the Blind in Milan; La Religione, a large statue in an aedicule for Keller; and finally a statue and medallion of La Mestizia at the same cemetery. He also sculpted the Bishop Novasconi statue in the Duomo of Cremona; La Martire; and the Song of Innocence (Sonno dell'Innocenza); A Bather; Eve after her Sin; La Rosa degli Amori; and Perseus freeing Andromeda (1884). Several of his works have won prizes at the Esposizione Nazionale of Florence, the Esposizione Internazionale of Paris, the Esposizione Internazionale of Munich (including silver medal for his Sonno dell' Innocenza, which had won gold prize at Paris), and also in Vienna, Philadelphia, and Santiago de Chile.

In 1867 he was knighted into the legion d'Onore of France. He was also entered into the Order of the Crown of Italy, and honorary associate of the Academies of Fine Arts of Milan, Urbino and Naples.
