= Veiled Vestal =

1847 sculpture by Raffaelle Monti

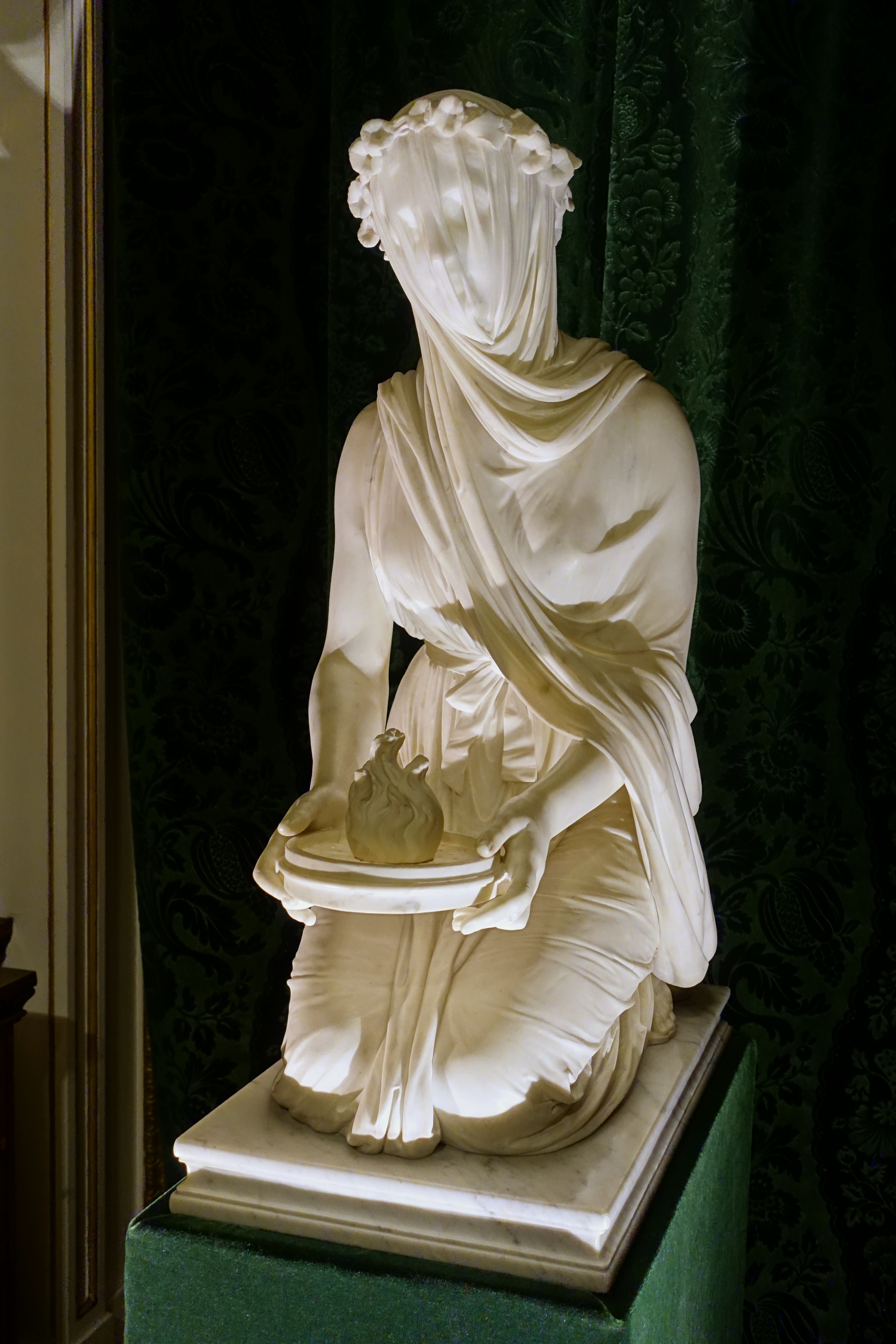
A front quarter view of the sculpture

The Veiled Vestal (Italian: La vestale velata) is an 1847 sculpture by Raffaelle Monti. It was commissioned by William Cavendish, 6th Duke of Devonshire during an 1846 trip to Naples. It is a representation of a Vestal Virgin, the priestesses of the Ancient Roman goddess Vesta. The subject was popular at this time due to the then recent discovery of the House of the Vestals in Pompeii. The depiction of translucent fabrics was popular at the time and Monti was requested to use the technique in this sculpture. Monti completed the sculpture in April 1847 and it was afterwards displayed at Cavendish's West London Chiswick House.

The Veiled Vestal was moved to Chatsworth House, the seat of the Cavendish family, in 1999. In 2005 it appeared in Joe Wright's Pride and Prejudice film. The sculpture was featured prominently in a scene where the protagonist Elizabeth Bennet visits Pemberley, the house of Mr. Darcy. One critic noted that the sculpture was used as a representation of Elizabeth, with the flame representing her sexual desire and the veil her failure to see Darcy "for what he is". In 2019 the sculpture was transported to New York to feature in a 12-week exhibition of works from Chatsworth.

== Description ==
The sculpture is a marble representation of a veiled Vestal Virgin, the priestesses of Vesta, goddess of hearth and home, whose duty it was to keep a sacred fire burning in her temple in Ancient Rome. The Vestal Virgins were a popular subject of the time following the discovery of the House of the Vestals in Pompeii in the previous century. The choice of a veiled figure continued a trend for sculptors of the time to depict flowing fabrics in marble form, a revival of a practice used by ancient sculptors.

== History ==
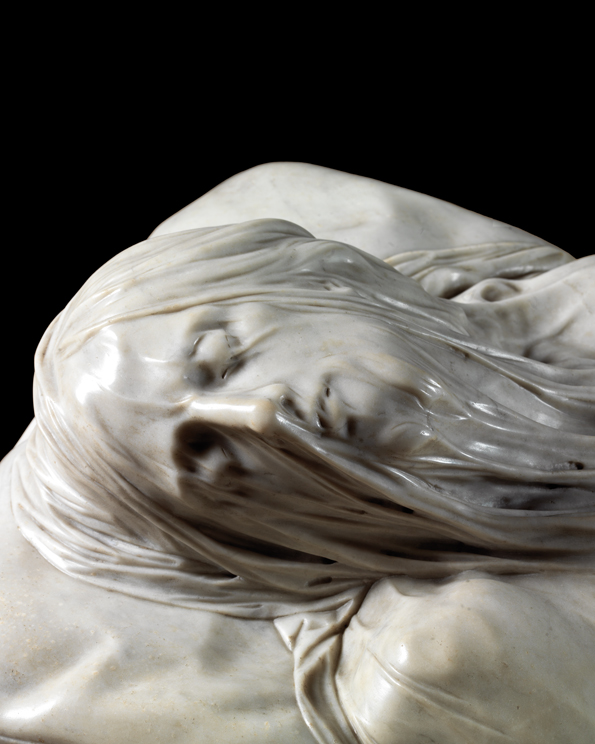
Detail from Sanmartino's Veiled Christ

William Cavendish, 6th Duke of Devonshire commissioned the sculpture from Raffaelle Monti on 18 October 1846, having visited Monti's studio a week earlier. Cavendish gave Monti a £60 deposit (equivalent to £6048 today) for the work on 19 October. Cavendish requested a depiction, in marble, of a veiled woman. Such sculptures, imitating translucent fabrics, were popular at the time and Cavendish's close friend, the sculptor Antonio Canova, was a particular admirer of Giuseppe Sanmartino's 1753 Veiled Christ. Monti completed the sculpture by April 1847.

Cavendish appears to have displayed the work at his west London Chiswick House. The sculpture made Monti famous in his field. After joining the failed 1848 revolutions against Austrian rule, he moved to London where he became known for creating works similar to the Veiled Vestal. Monti used the "veiled virgin" motif in many sculptures and helped to inspire a "cottage industry" for this type of figure. He became a busy commercial artist and his veiled A Circassian Slave in the Market Place at Constantinople (afterwards also purchased by Cavendish) was featured in the Great Exhibition of 1851 along with the Vestal Virgin and other examples of his work. Despite this Monti ended his career in debt, forced to sell his sculpting tools, and died in 1881 in the house of German watchmaker in London.

The Veiled Vestal was brought to Chatsworth House, which remains the seat of the Cavendish family, in 1999. In May 2019 the sculpture was removed from public display and transported to Sotheby's, New York, where it formed part of the 12-week Treasures from Chatsworth exhibition, designed by David Korins. The 42 items in the exhibition were selected by Peregrine Cavendish, 12th Duke of Devonshire and his wife Amanda.

== Appearance in Pride and Prejudice and the Met Gala ==
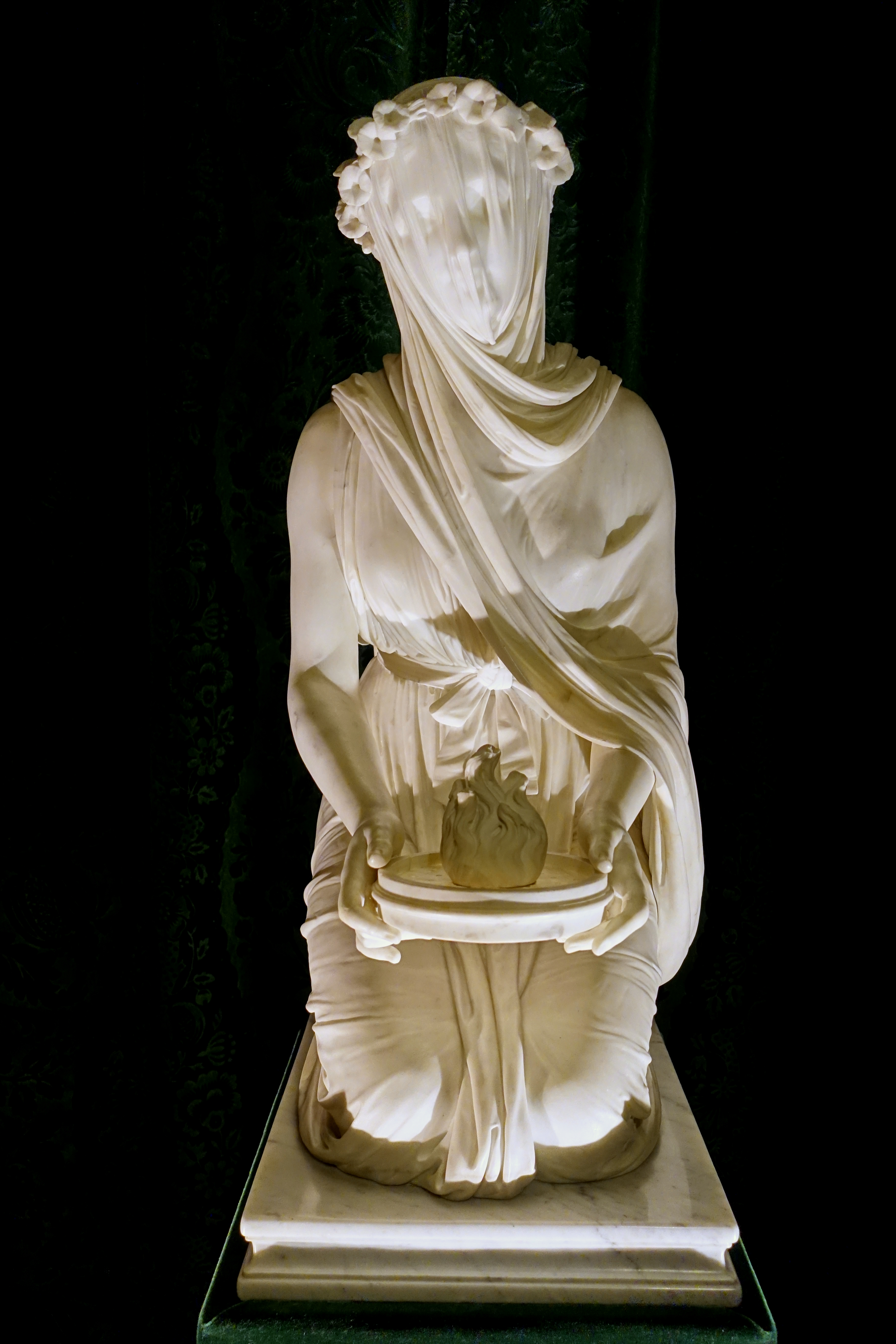
Front view

In 2005 the sculpture appeared in Joe Wright's film Pride and Prejudice. Chatsworth House stood in for the book's Pemberley estate, the home of Mr. Darcy. In the film Elizabeth Bennet, played by Keira Knightley, pays a visit to Pemberley and is given a tour of the house. One scene shows her in the house's sculpture gallery. The first sculpture shown is the Veiled Vestal, with the camera focusing on the figure's face whilst panning around it. It then cuts to show a wider view with Elizabeth closely regarding the figure's face while the camera pans around the rear of the sculpture. Elizabeth then moves away after glancing at the rest of the figure.

The scene was written to be set in a gallery of paintings but was altered to make use of the sculpture gallery at Chatsworth. Later in the scene Elizabeth views other sculptures in the gallery and it ends with her long contemplation upon a bust of Mr. Darcy, her future husband.

Susan Felleman (2014) suggests that the sculpture is used in the film as a representation of Elizabeth. She considers that the figure's flame reflects Elizabeth's "virginal sexual desire" and the veil represents the things that have previously "prevented her from seeing Darcy for what he is". She also notes that Vesta's role as the goddess of hearth and home, with traditional links to wifely duties, represents Elizabeth's potential as a wife to Darcy.

At the 2026 Met Gala for the exhibition Costume Art, the supermodel and Project Runway television personality Heidi Klum brought new attention to the sculpture in wearing an outfit that veered into the costume inspire by the work.

Partial 3D scan

== See also ==
- Vestal Virgin Tuccia, 1743 sculpture
- Modesty, 1752 sculpture
- Veiled Christ, 1753 sculpture
- The Veiled Virgin, mid-19th century sculpture
- The Veiled Nun, c. 1863 sculpture
- Veiled Rebecca, 1863 sculpture
