= Giovanni Maria Benzoni =

Italian sculptor

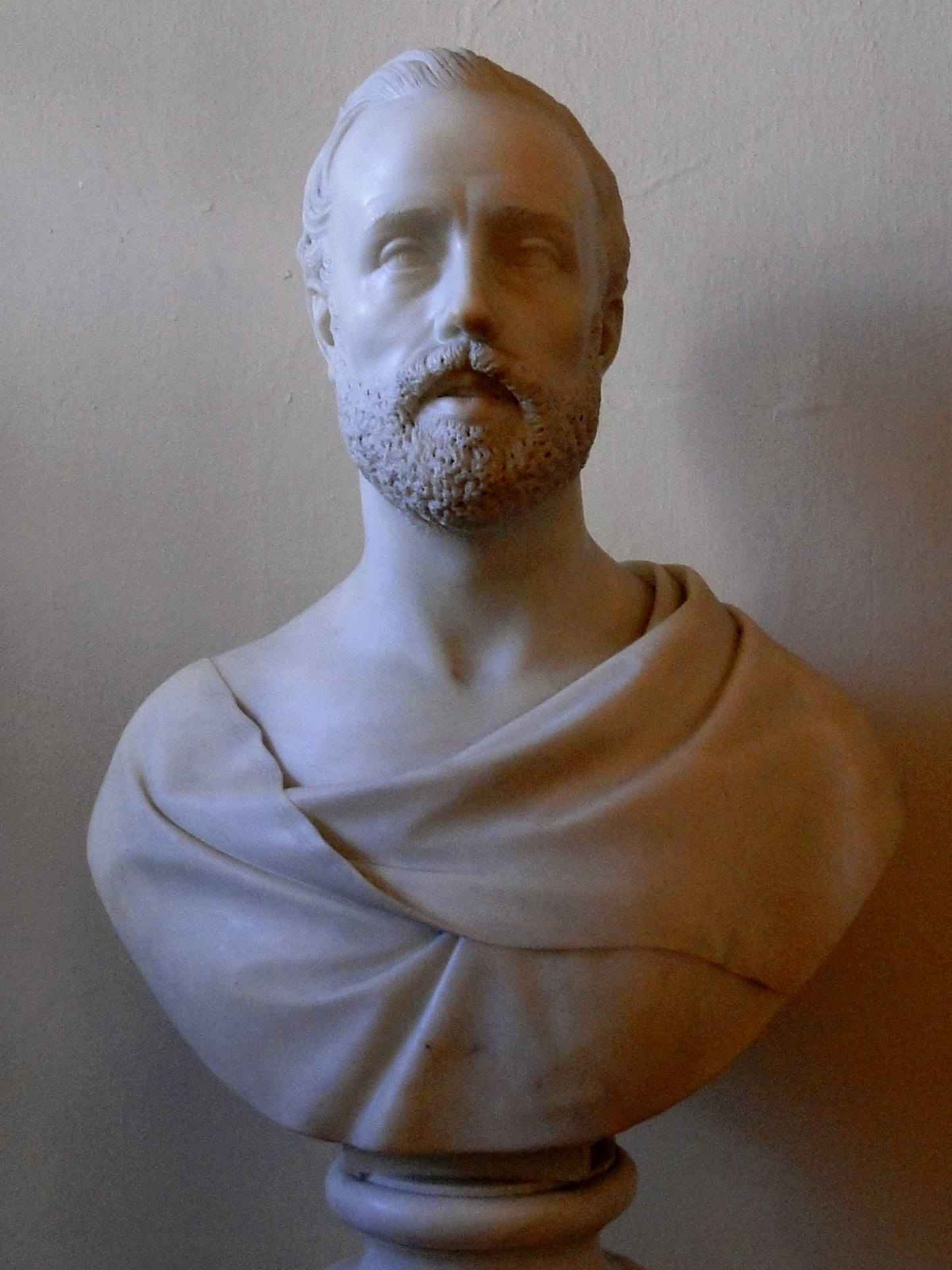
- Self-portrait bust at the Biblioteca Angelo Mai di Bergamo
- Born: August 28, 1809; Songavazzo
- Died: April 28, 1873 (aged 63); Rome
- Known for: Sculpture
- Movement: Neoclassicism

Giovanni Maria Benzoni (28 August 1809 – 28 April 1873) was an Italian neoclassical sculptor. He was trained in Rome, where he later set up his own workshop.

Benzoni designed some of his sculptures with a production line in mind using other sculptors to produce the works in order to satisfy a growing demand for people on the Grand Tour who wanted cultural mementos to take back home. Benzoni produced sculpture for the funeral monument to the Roman Catholic Italian Cardinal Angelo Mai.

Benzoni also created the white marble image of Saint Anne and the child Blessed Virgin Mary which was granted a decree of pontifical coronation on 9 September 1877 after his death by Pope Pius IX, now enshrined within the Apt Cathedral of Saint Anne.

Sculptures by Benzoni of the Veiled Rebecca can be found in the Salar Jung Museum (Hyderabad, India), High Museum of Art (Atlanta, Georgia) and the Berkshire Museum (Pittsfield, Massachusetts). Examples of his Flight from Pompeii can be found in Todmorden Town Hall, Yorkshire and the statuary pavilion at the Ballarat Botanical Gardens, Victoria Australia. Examples of his Young Dionysus With a Nymph can be found at the Museum of Fine Arts, Houston, Houston Texas.

== Gallery ==
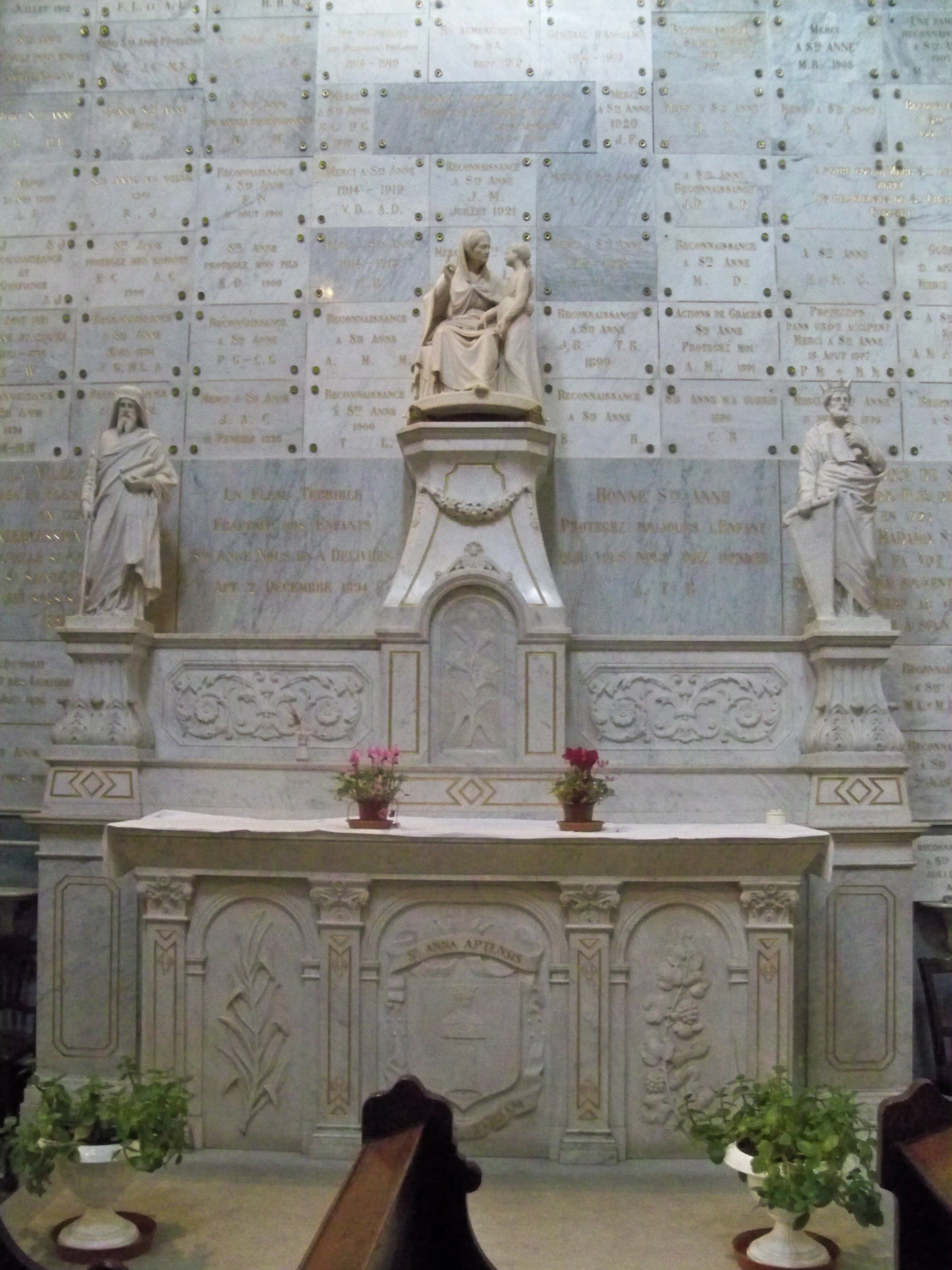
Child Virgin Mary and Saint Anne (Crowned by Pope Pius IX in 1877)

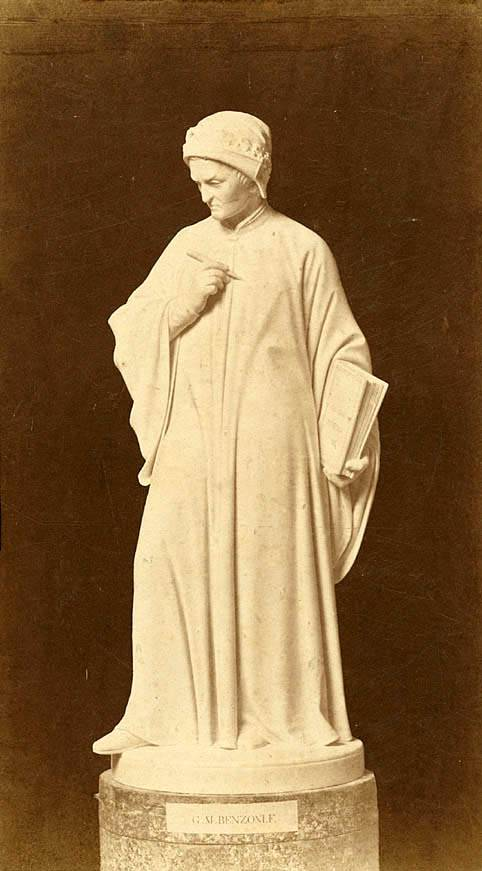
Dante

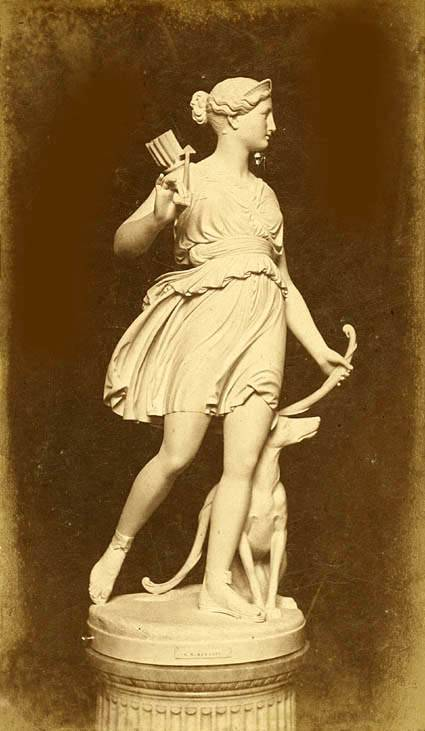
Diana

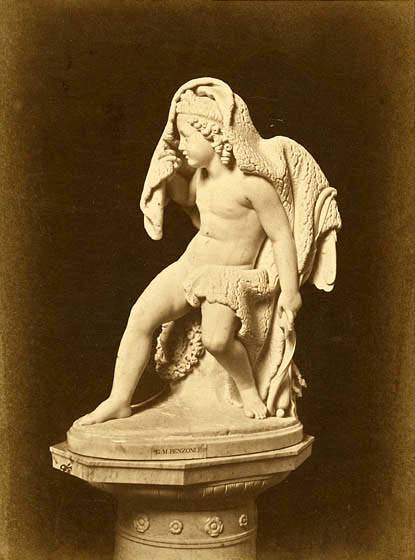
Amor

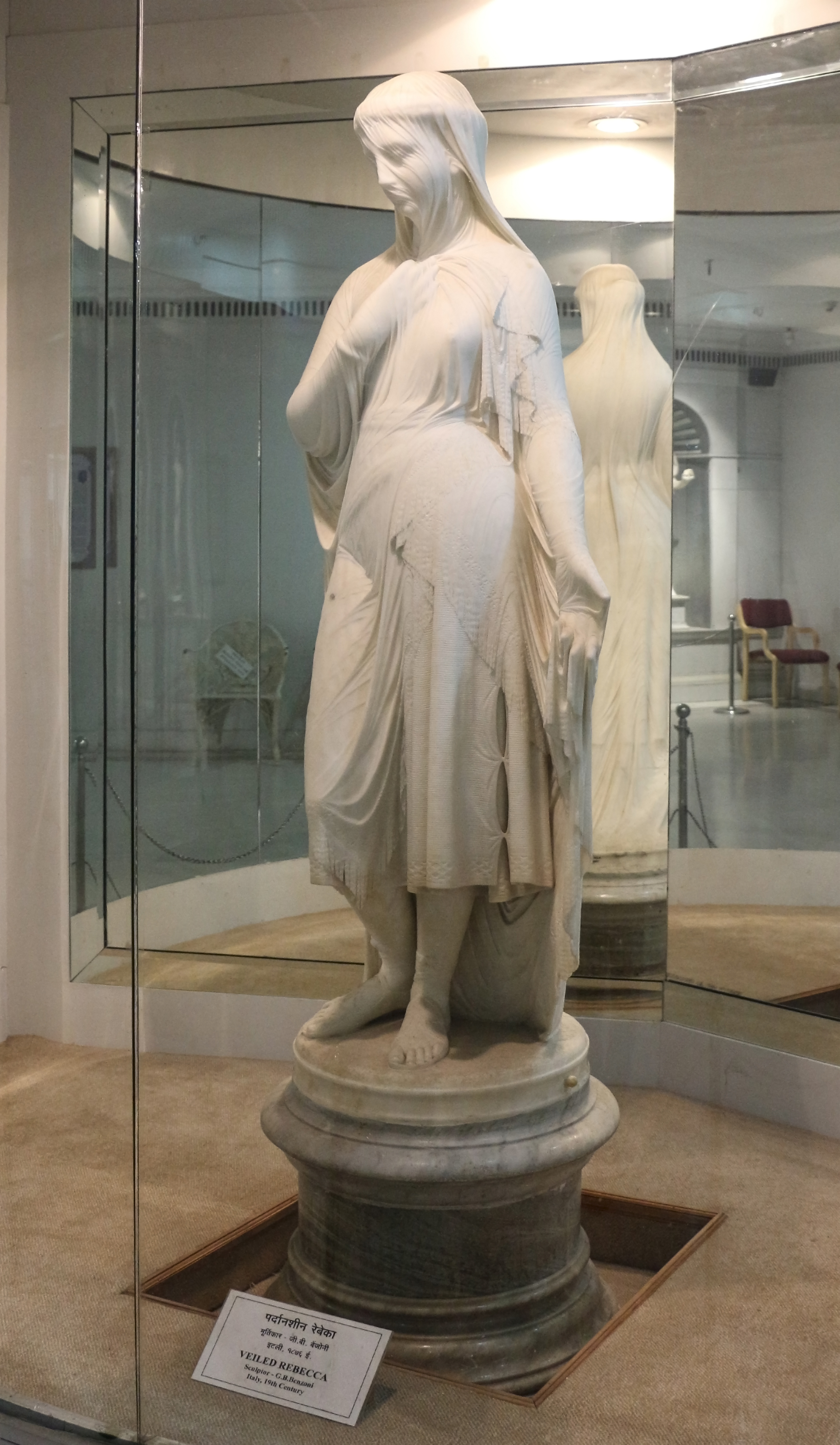
The Veiled Rebecca at the Salar Jung Museum, Hyderabad, India
