= Pietro Rossi (sculptor) =

Italian artist

Pietro Rossi was an Italian sculptor who was active between 1856 and 1882. His reputation is overshadowed by that of his more famous Italian contemporary Giovanni Strazza (1818–1875). Little is known about Pietro Rossi's life other than that he participated in an exhibition in the Italian city of Novara, north of Milan, in 1856.

Rossi's 1882 marble bust of a veiled lady in the Gibbes Museum of Art is a prime example of the Italian nationalist art movement called Risorgimento. The image of the veiled woman was intended to symbolize Italy just as Britannia symbolized England, Hibernia symbolized Ireland, and Lady Liberty symbolized the United States.
