= Giovanni Strazza =

Italian sculptor (1818–1876)

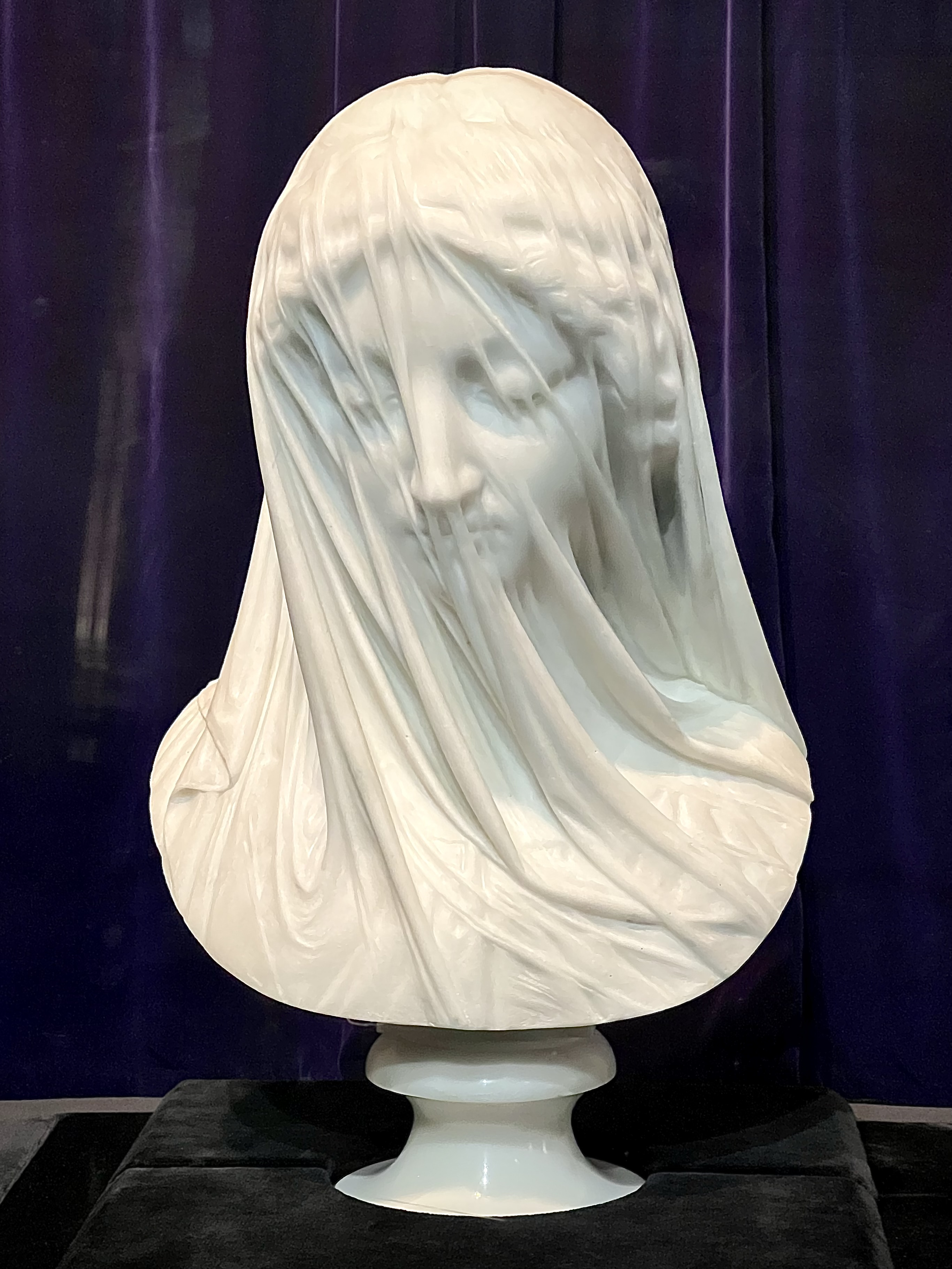
Strazza's The Veiled Virgin

Giovanni Strazza (1818–1875) was an Italian sculptor who was born in Milan, Italy. He studied at Brera Academy in Milan and then worked in Rome between 1840 and 1858. He returned to Milan where he taught at his alma mater from 1860 to 1875, passing the "Sculpture Chair" to Giosuè Argenti.

== Work ==
- Strazza's best known work is The Veiled Virgin.
- A replica (2005) of Strazza's L'Audace Righetto stands on the Janiculum Hill in Roma; the original (1851) is in the Palazzo Litta in Milano
- Ishmael Abandoned in the Desert, a replica of which from 1850 is exhibited at the Gallery of Modern Art in Milan.
