= Raffaele Monti =

Italian artist (1818–1881)

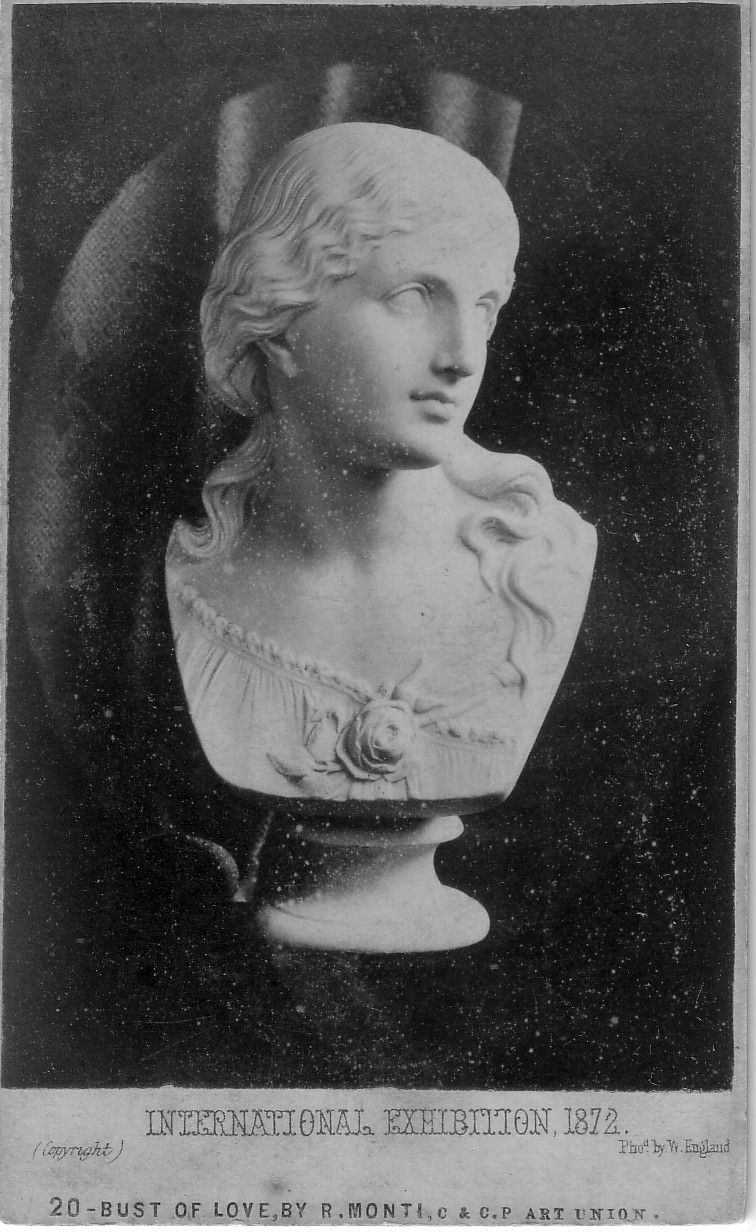
Parian porcelain bust of Love by Raffaele Monti. Issued by the Ceramic and Crystal Palace Art Union, and exhibited at the International Exhibition, London 1872. Photographed by William England, London Stereoscopic Company.

Raffaele Monti (often misspelt Rafaelle or Raffaelle; Milan 1818–1881) was an Italian sculptor, writer, and poet.

Born in Milan or Iseo, he studied under his father, the noted sculptor Gaetano Matteo Monti, in the Imperial Academy. At the age of only 20, he was invited to Vienna, where he received extensive patronage; he returned to Milan after two years.

In 1846, Monti travelled to England for a year and later settled there. Monti exhibited at the Royal Academy, and soon earned recognition as a leading sculptor with his piece for the 6th Duke of Devonshire, the Veiled Vestal (1847), a figure with an illusionistic veil, a specialism of his. A bust based on this work and cast in Parian porcelain by Copeland, entitled The Bride but often known as The Veiled Bride, was issued in 1861 by the Crystal Palace Art Union. This became one of the most popular Parian busts ever produced.

Monti produced sculptures in marble, but also created in metals and porcelain, while remaining active in the applied arts.

== Works ==
- La Donna Velata (bust) 1845 Castle of Racconigi
- Veiled Vestal 1847 Chatsworth House .
- A Circassian Slave in the Market Place at Constantinople 1850 Wallace Collection.
- Sister Anglers in Carrara marble displayed at The Great Exhibition in London, 1851
- Cupid and Modesty, a pair, 1853: davidwilsonfineart.com
- Veritas 1853 Medeiros e Almeida Museum Medeiros de Almeida Foundation, Lisbon, Portugal.
- River Thames 1854 St John's Lock on the River Thames below Lechlade Originally for the fountains at The Crystal Palace Sydenham
- La Donna Velata (The Veiled Woman) 1854 Metropolitan Museum of Art
- Proscenium Arch 1858 Royal Opera House
- Charles Stewart, 3rd Marquess of Londonderry 1858 Market Place, Durham .
- Veiled Lady (bust) 1860 Minneapolis Institute of Arts
- The Sleep of Sorrow and the Dream of Joy 1861 Victoria and Albert Museum
- The Mother 1871 Potteries Museum & Art Gallery

(Also produced in Parian by Copeland)

- Night 1862 Parian figure produced by Copeland
- Morning 1862 Parian figure produced by Copeland

== Picture gallery ==
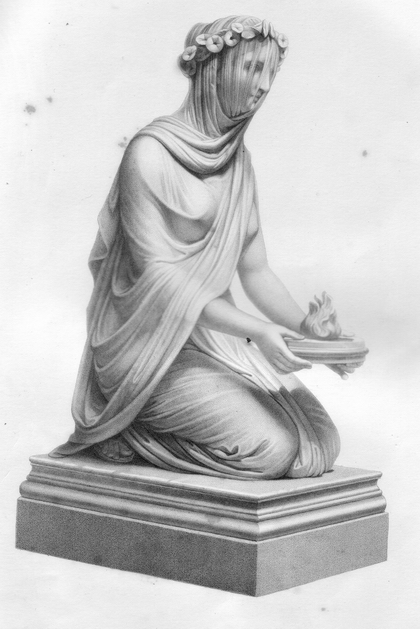
Veiled Vestal ca 1848. Now at Chatsworth House.

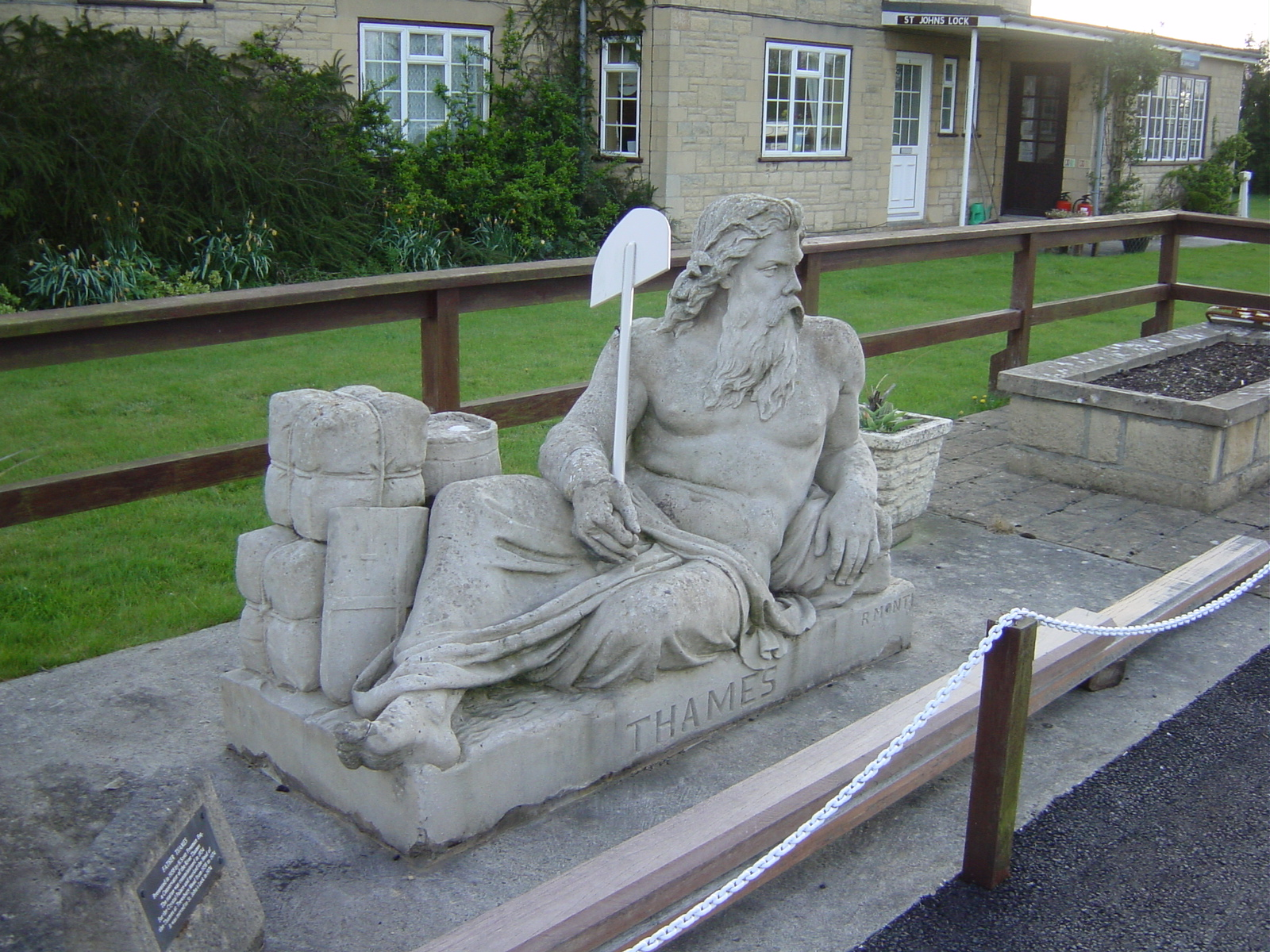
Statue of Father Thames ca. 1853, at St John's Lock, Lechlade

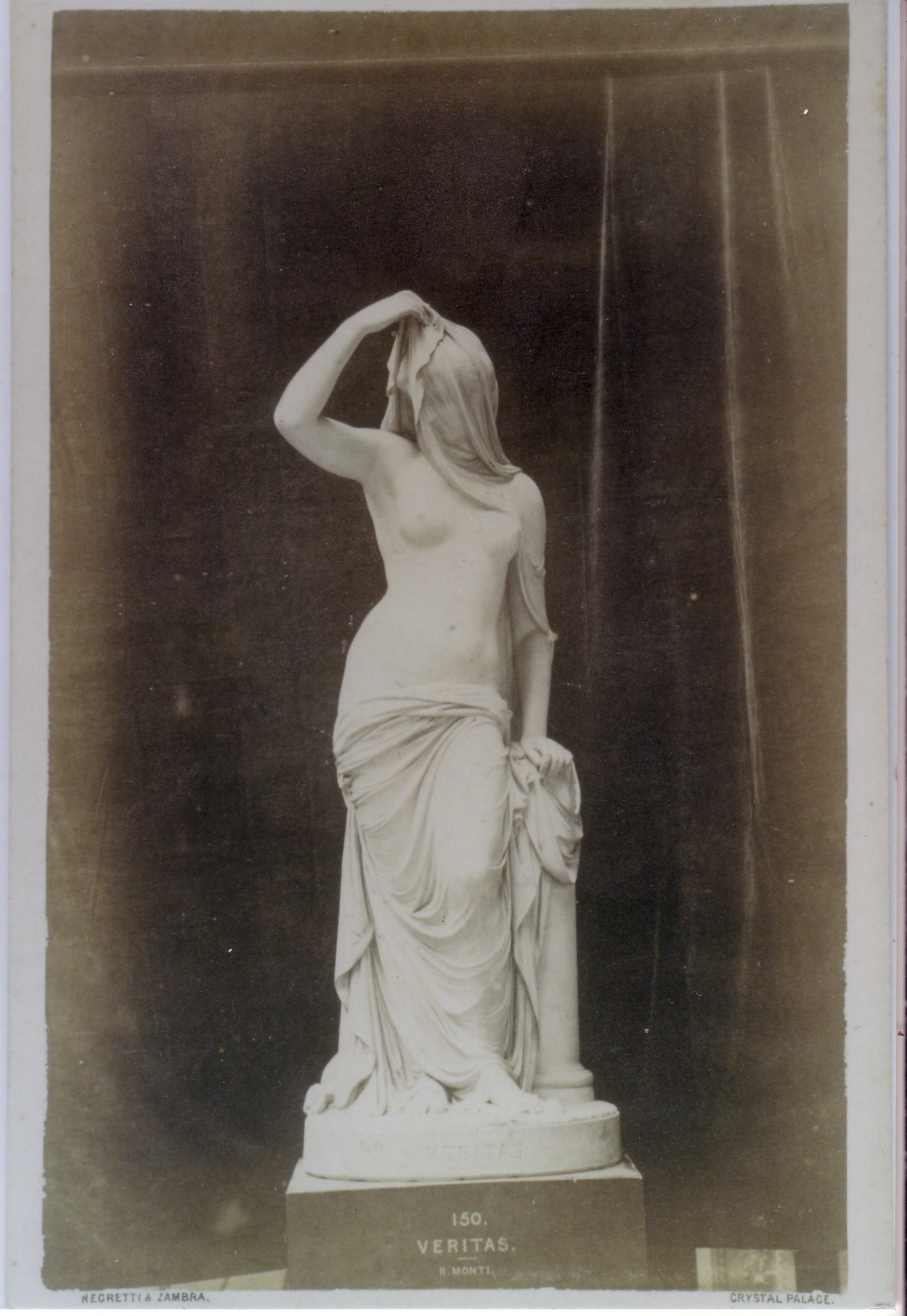
Veritas ca 1853. From plaster original at the Crystal Palace Sydenham [destroyed 1936]

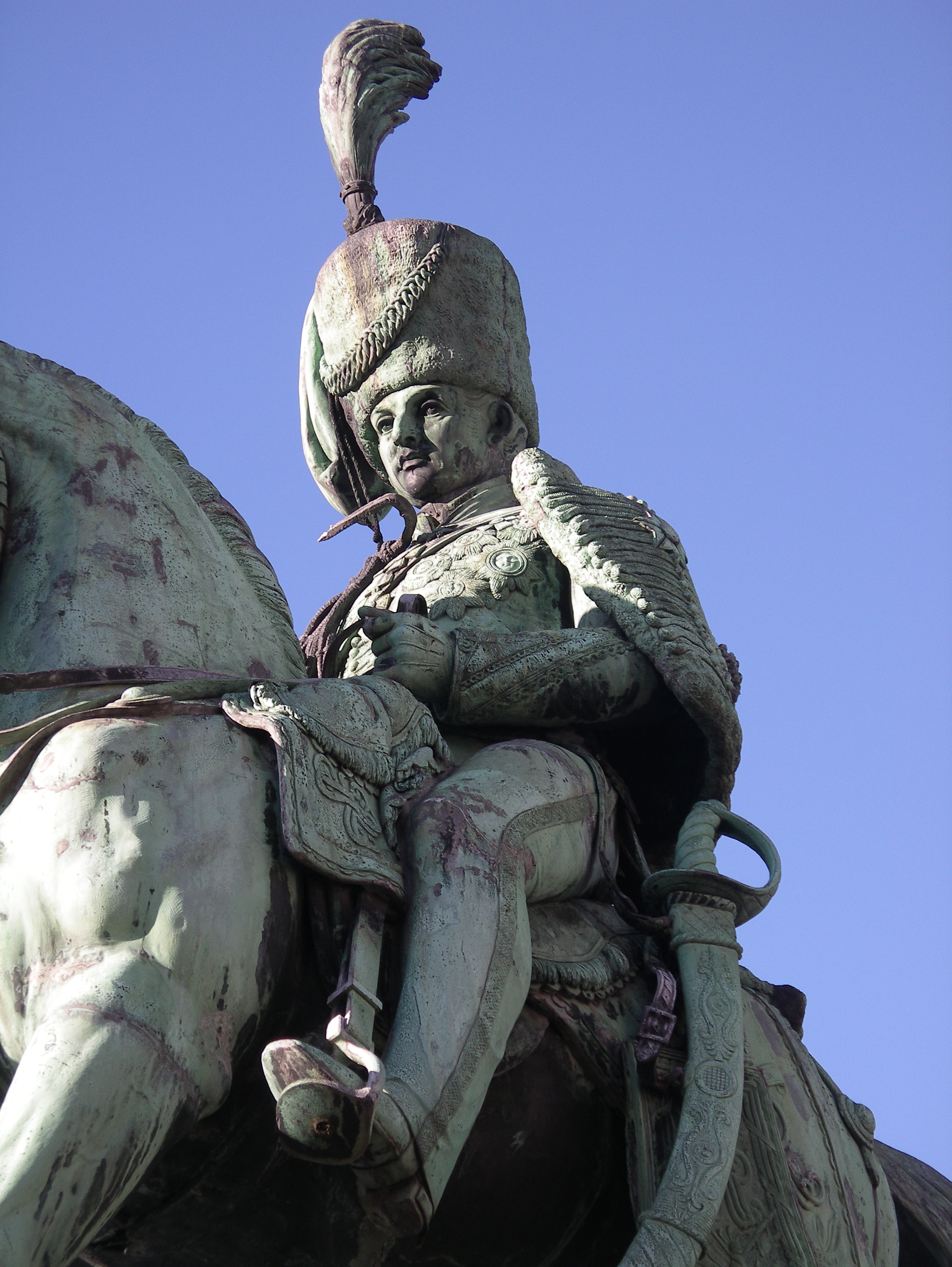
Charles Vane, 3rd Marquess of Londonderry ca 1861 at Durham.

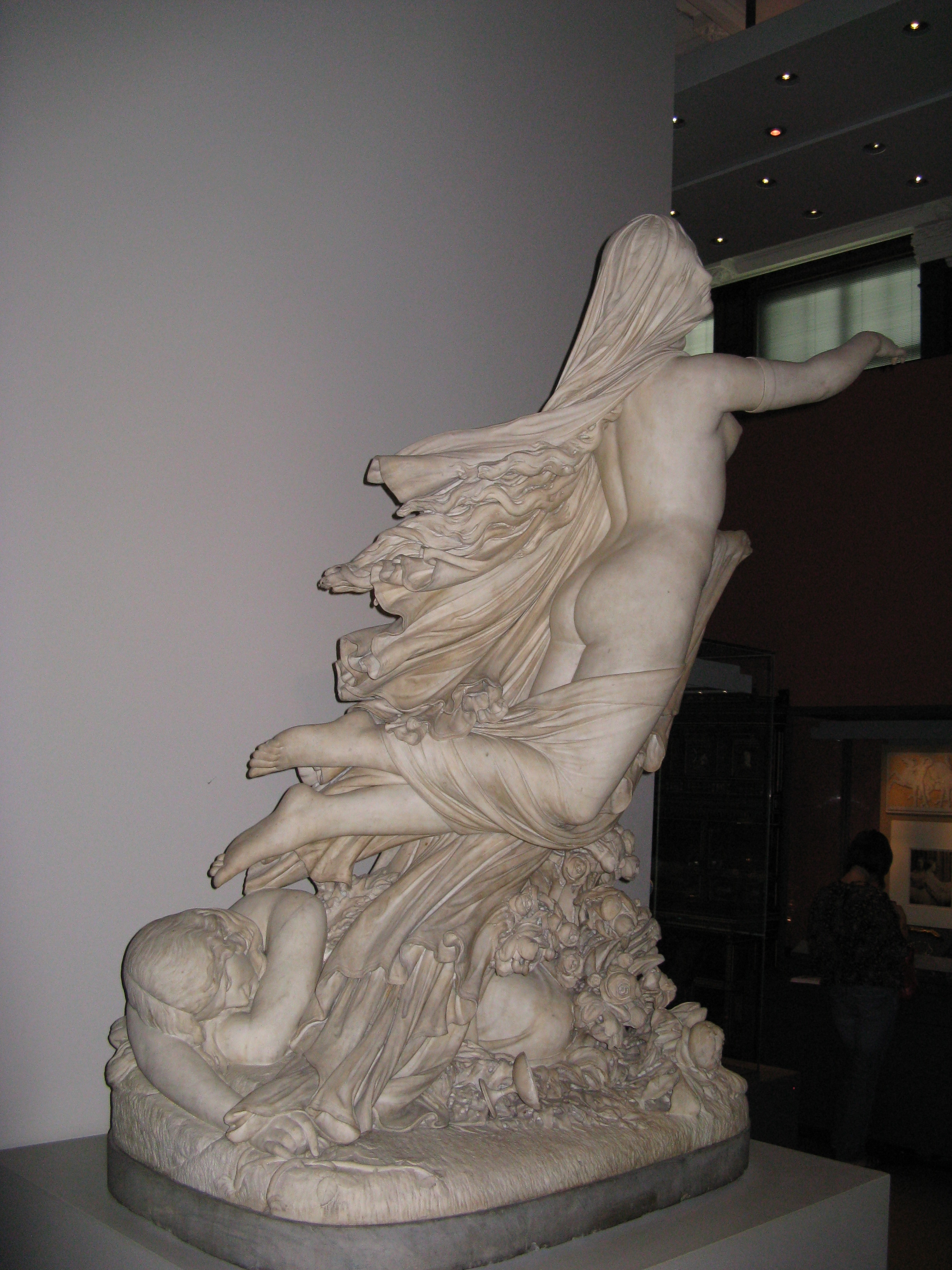
The Sleep of Sorrow and the Dream of Joy ca. 1862. Victoria and Albert Museum

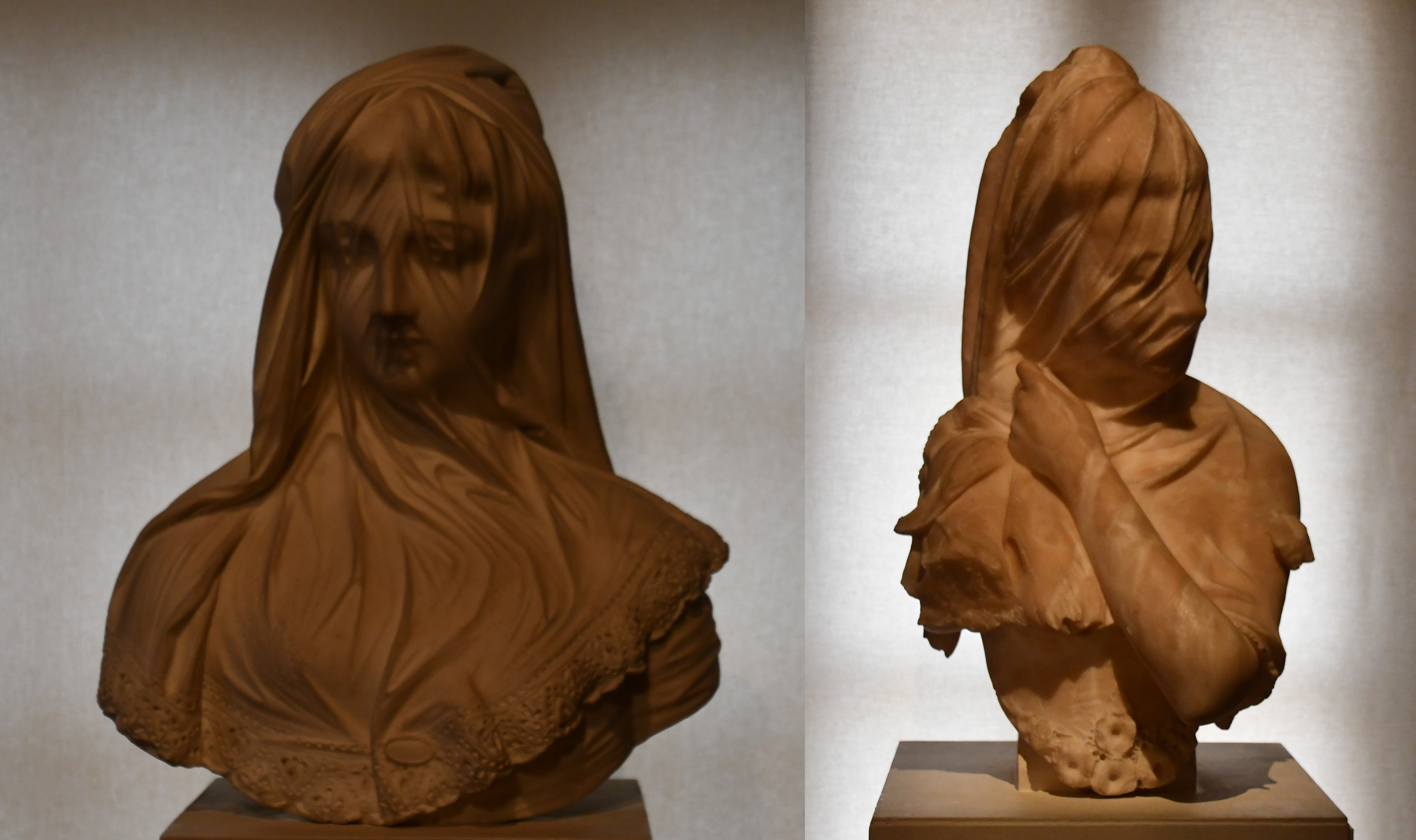
Busts of Women Voil - Around 1860 - Marble - Musée des Ursulines - Mâcon
