= Teatro Re =

Theatre in Milan, Italy

Coordinates: 45°28′N 9°11′E

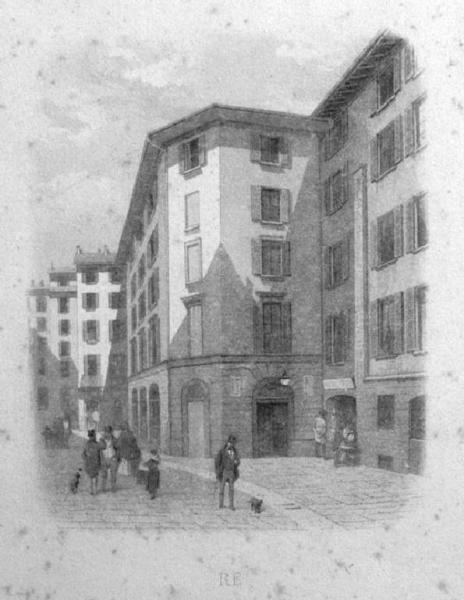
Teatro Re depicted c.1860

The Teatro Re was a theatre in Milan, located near the Piazza del Duomo and named for its proprietor, Carlo Re. It functioned as both a prose theatre and an opera house and saw the world premieres of numerous operas, including four by Giovanni Pacini. Designed by Luigi Canonica, the theatre was inaugurated in 1813, closed in 1872, and demolished in 1879.

== History ==
The Teatro Re was named for its proprietor, Carlo Re, a Milanese businessman and impresario who in his early days had been a shoemaker. Designed by Luigi Canonica, the theatre was built on the site of the demolished church of San Salvatore in Xenodochio which had been established in the late 8th century as the chapel for Milan's first orphanage. The building of the theatre began in 1812 and was completed the following year. It was inaugurated on 18 December 1813 with a new production of Rossini's opera Tancredi. Three months later, the first play was presented, Marie-Joseph Chénier's Fénelon performed by the Ciarli company.

Less than half the size of La Scala (Milan's main opera house), the Teatro Re had an overall seating capacity of 1000 arranged over an upper balcony, three tiers of boxes, and eight rows of seats on the floor of the auditorium. Its lavish interior was designed and decorated by Alessandro Sanquirico. The curtain, which depicted the Judgement of Paris, was painted by Pasquale Canna, who like Sanquirico, also worked as a set painter and designer for La Scala. The interior of the theatre was refurbished and re-painted in 1836. According to the Italian writer, Marcello Mazzoni (1801–1853), it was long overdue. He wrote the previous year that while the theatre "possesses all the advantages required for the good performance of a comedy, [...] it wants cleansing, for it cannot be more wretchedly dirty."

From its early days, the theatre was well attended, due partly to its central location but also to its varied repertoire that alternated between opera (both buffa and seria) and plays. It also became a popular gathering place for Milanese intellectuals and patriots. The Teatro Re hosted over 20 world premieres of operas and ballets between 1814 and 1848 and saw performances by some of Italy's most prominent theatre companies, including those of Carlotta Marchionni, Gaetana Goldoni, Gustavo Modena.

In 1846 Carlo Re ceded management of the theatre to the actor Giacinto Battaglia and later to the former singer Teresa Cesarani. During the revolution of 1848, the theatre's repertoire oriented towards works with patriotic themes, such as Silvio Pellico's play Francesca da Rimini. The Palestra parlamentaria, a group of journalists, lawyers, and artists who supported the first Italian war of independence, held its first public meetings at the theatre in May 1848.

The Teatro Re's popularity began a slow decline in the second half of the 19th century, and it supplemented its theatrical and operatic productions with acrobatic and science shows. However, the correspondent for The Musical World wrote as late as 1866 that for drama "the only respectable theatre available [in Milan] is the Teatro Re, and this is so small that there is never any chance of obtaining a seat unless you are there at the time the doors are opened." Its operatic repertoire also remained adventurous with the theatre presenting the first Italian productions of Offenbach's La belle Hélène in 1867 and Félicien David's Lalla-Roukh in 1870.

The Teatro Re finally closed its doors on 5 June 1872. Its last performance was Rossini's The Barber of Seville. For a while some of its repertoire moved to the Nuovo Teatro Re (New Teatro Re) which had been opened in the Porta Ticinese district by Carlo Re's son Giovanni in 1864. Slightly larger but less elegant than the old Teatro Re, the Nuovo Teatro Re was in operation until 1887. The building of the original Teatro Re was acquired by the city of Milan and demolished in 1879 during the restructuring of the area around the newly built Galleria Vittorio Emanuele.

== Opera premieres ==
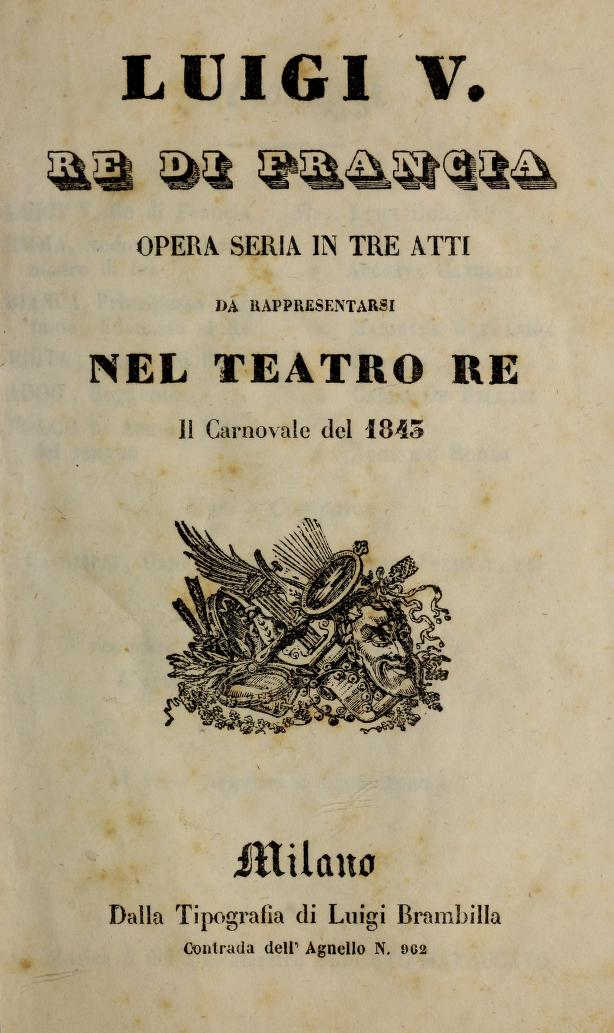
Libretto of Alberto Mazzucato's Luigi V, re di Francia, printed for its premiere at the Teatro Re in 1843

Operas which had their world premieres at the Teatro Re include:

- Evellina, opera seria in 2 acts composed by Carlo Coccia, libretto by Gaetano Rossi, 26 December 1814
- La scoperta inaspettata, opera buffa in 2 acts composed by Carlo Bigatti, libretto by Francesco Marconi, 1 January 1815
- Il matrimonio per procura, dramma giocoso in 1 act composed by Giovanni Pacini, libretto by Angelo Anelli, 2 January 1817
- Dalla beffa il disinganno, dramma giocoso in 1 act composed by Giovanni Pacini, libretto by Angelo Anelli, 12 January 1817 (Note: Also premiering at the 12 January 1817 performance was the ballet La finta pazza per amore, composed and choreographed by Luigi Montani.)
- Piglia il mondo come viene, dramma giocoso in 2 acts composed by Giovanni Pacini, libretto by Angelo Anelli, 28 May 1817
- Adelaide e Comingio, opera semi-seria in 2 acts composed by Giovanni Pacini, libretto by Gaetano Rossi, 30 December 1817
- Il carnevale di Venezia, opera buffa in 2 acts composed by Francesco Boyle, libretto by Girolamo Canestrari, 21 January 1819
- I furbi al cimento, opera buffa in 2 acts composed by Carlo Bigatti, libretto by Francesco Marconi, 13 February 1819
- Marsia, opera in 2 acts composed by Giovanni Arcangelo Gambarana, libretto by "X.Y.Z.", 1 December 1819 (Note: Also premiering at the 1 December 1819 performance was the ballet La pastorella fortunata composed and choreographed by Giovanni Battista Giannini.)
- La festa di Bussone, opera buffa in 2 acts composed by Michele Carafa, libretto by Silvio Pellico, 28 June 1820
- I due sergenti, opera in 2 acts composed by Alberto Mazzucato, libretto by Felice Romani, 27 February 1841
- Don Papirio sindaco, opera buffa in 2 acts composed by Giocondo Degola, libretto by Lazzaro Damezzano, 28 July 1841
- Un duello alla pistola opera semi-seria in 2 acts composed by Giocondo Degola, libretto by Francesco Regli, 26 December 1841
- Luigi V, re di Francia, opera seria in 3 acts, composed by Alberto Mazzucato, libretto by Felice Romani, 25 February 1843
- Il borgomastro di Schiedam, opera buffa in 3 acts composed by Lauro Rossi, libretto by Giovanni Peruzzini, 1 June 1844
- Le due sorelle di Corinto, opera in 3 acts composed by Giuseppe Devasini, libretto by the composer based on Goethe's ballad Die Braut von Korinth, 5 July 1846
- Ser Gregorio, dramma giocoso in 2 acts composed by Giovanni Consolini, librettist unknown, 7 February 1848
- Il testamento di Figaro, opera buffa in 2 acts composed by Antonio Cagnoni, libretto by Calisto Bassi, 26 February 1848
- Margherita, opera semi-seria in 2 acts composed by Jacopo Foroni, libretto by Giorgio Ciacchetti, 8 March 1848
- Bianca di Belmonte, opera in 4 acts composed by Giuseppe Devasini, libretto by Alessandro Carozzi, 30 January 1853
- Claudia, opera in 3 acts composed by Emanuele Muzio, libretto by Giulio Carcano, 7 February 1853
