= Riccardo Gandolfi =

Italian composer and music critic

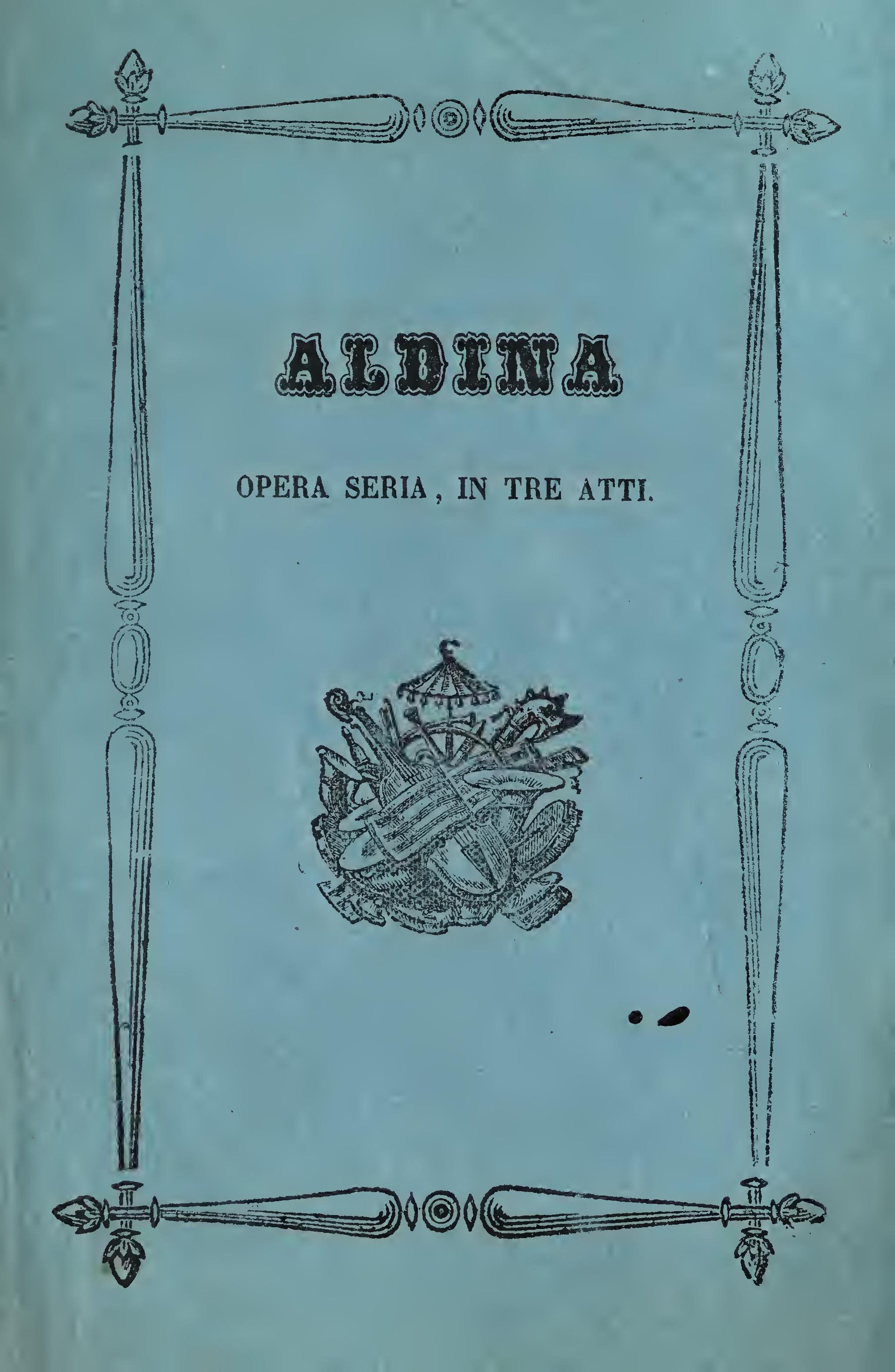

Riccardo Gandolfi (16 February 1839 – 6 April 1920) was an Italian composer and music critic.

== Biography ==
Born in Voghera. His mother Camilla Guiscardi was a painter. He was sent to study musical composition in the Conservatory of Naples under C. Conti. He then moved to Florence to study under Teodulo Mabellini and Giovanni Pacini.

His first opera, Aldina, was staged in the Santa Radegonda theater of Milan. His second opera, Il paggio, was staged at the Royal Theater of Turin and used as libretto by Giovanni Peruzzini. He also wrote Il Conte di Monreale and Caterina di Guisa. He wrote a number of symphonic and chamber works, including a requiem for King Carlo Alberto played in the Turin Cathedral. He wrote a cantata Il battesimo di Santa Cecilia (1875). However, Gandolfi served for two decades as librarian of the Conservatory Luigi Cherubini in Florence, and is best remembered for his publications on music and musicians.

== Publications ==
- Appunti intorno all'arpa, all'oboe e all'organo (Florence 1887);
- Giacomo Rossini, in Rassegna nazionale, 16 May 1887, pp. 257–267;
- Una riparazione a proposito di Francesco Landino, ibid., 1 December 1888, pp. 538–549;
- Commemorazione di W.A. Mozart, in Atti dell'Accademia del Regio Istituto musicale di Firenze, XXVIII (1891);
- Illustrazioni di alcuni cimeli concernenti l'arte musicale in Firenze, ibid., XXIX (1892);
- Indice di alcuni cimeli esistenti nella Biblioteca del Regio Istituto musicale Cherubini di Firenze, ibid., XXIX (1892);
- Appunti di storia musicale. C. Malvezzi, E. de' Cavalieri, in Rassegna nazionale, 16 November 1893, pp. 297–306;
- Dell'opera in musica, in Atti dell'Accademia del Regio Istituto musicale di Firenze, XXXII (1895);
- Appunti attorno al pianoforte, Firenze 1895;
- Alcune considerazioni intorno alla riforma melodrammaticadi Giulio Caccini detto Romano, Rivista Musicale Italiana, III (1896), pp. 714–720;
- Onoranze fiorentine a Gioacchino Rossini, in Atti dell'Accademia del R. Istituto musicale di Firenze, XXXIX (1902);
- Accademia dedicata all'ouverture nell'arte italiana, in Rivista musicale italiana, X (1903), pp. 396 ss.;
- Due accademie di musica date per esercizio e cultura degli alunni (Dell'arte del violino e del violoncello in Italia - La musica di G. Raff), ibid. XI (1904), pp. 650 ss.;
- In onore di antichi musicisti fiorentini, in Rassegna nazionale, 1° dic. 1906, pp. 566–569;
- Luigi Ferdinando Casamorata, in Ricordi musicali fiorentini, II (1906–07);
- Alcune notizie sulla Società filarmonica in occasione del centenario di G. Haydn, ibid., IV (1908–09);
- La Cappella musicale della corte di Toscana (1593-1859), Rivista Musicale italiana, XVI (1909), pp. 506–530;
- Luigi Gordigiani, in Ricordi musicali fiorentini, V (1909–10), pp. 1–8;
- Il centenario artistico di Giuseppe Verdi e la Società filarmonica fiorentina, ibid., VII (1911–12), pp. 1–15;
- Intorno al Codice membranaceo di ballate e canzoncine di autori diversi con musica a 2, 3 e 4 voci esistente nella Biblioteca del R. Istituto musicale di Firenze, in Rivista Musicale italiana, XVIII (1911), pp. 537–545;
- Cinque lettere inedite di Giuseppe Verdi, ibid., XX (1913), pp. 168 ss.

He was honored as a cavaliere di Great Cross and awarded the medal of the Corona d'Italia in 1912.
