= Graffigna =

Graffigna is a surname. Notable people with the surname include:

- Achille Graffigna (1816–1896), Italian composer and conductor
- Julio Graffigna (born 1931), Argentine wrestler
- Omar Graffigna (1926–2019), Argentine Air Force officer
- Uruguay Graffigna (1948–2021), Uruguayan footballer
