= Ferdinando Giorgetti =

Italian composer, violinist, publicist, educator and conductor (1796–1867)

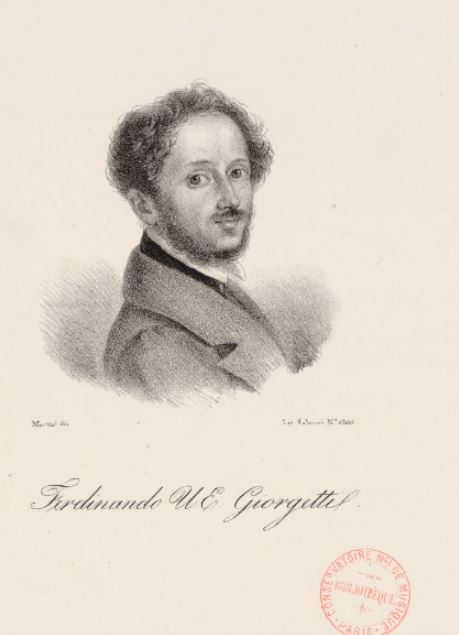

Ferdinando Giorgetti (23 June 1796 in Florence, Italy – 23 March 1867 in Florence, Italy) was a composer, violinist, educator and Italian publicist.

== Life ==
=== Child prodigy and royal teacher ===
Giorgetti, a child prodigy, started studying violin with Giovanni Francesco Giuliani at five years old and continued on this path for 9 years. However, nothing is known regarding his education of composition, so it is most probable that he was self-taught. The publications from that time mention him as the private violin instructor of Carlo II of Borbone-Parma, but no specific dates are given. Rumors originate from the fact that Giorgetti, in 1840, dedicated a complex sacred oratorio for choir and a large orchestra, Le turbe nel deserto, to Carlo II. The frontispiece of the autograph (today found in Parma, see Sources) affirm being given to the prince «i primi elementi di musica e restommi scolpito mai sempre nel cuore» («I gave the Prince his first education in music, and he remained struck in my heart»). Research into the lives of both of them indicates that it is probable that the dates of their lessons were 1808, so, if this is in fact true, twelve-year-old Giorgetti taught the 9-year-old prince.

=== First soloist experiences and paralysis ===
In 1811, Elisa Bonaparte hired him as her personal violinist («Chamber Violin of the Queen of Etruria»), and he traveled with her in Spain and France until 1814, the year in which two central occurrences took place in his life: the fall of Napoleon and the contraction of a mysterious disease affecting his nervous system which left him paralyzed from the hips down. Because of the loss of his job, and above all, his paralysis, he was forced to leave his career as a soloist and dedicate his efforts to composition, teaching, musical publicity, and the organization of events and performances.

=== First success as a composer ===
It was from that moment in his life that he perfected counterpoint with Disma Ugolini (1755-1828)[1], learning the methods in practice, derived from the experienced didactics of Antonin Reicha, who was a classmate of Beethoven and teacher of not only Ugolini, but also Franck, Adam, Berlioz and Liszt. In 1817, despite his paralysis, he traveled to Germany to publish his compositions in Leipzig, at Breitkopf & Härtel publishers (their relation lasted until 1825). In 1818, he composed a concerto for flute, extraordinarily and curiously similar to the second concerto that Saverio Mercadante wrote for the same instrument in 1819. In 1825, he won (tied with Luigi Ferdinando Casamorata) a competition by the Accademia di Belle Arti di Firenze centered around the putting to music of the cantata Il Ciclope by Pietro Metastasio.

=== Publicist and Fame: the union between German tradition and Italian singability ===
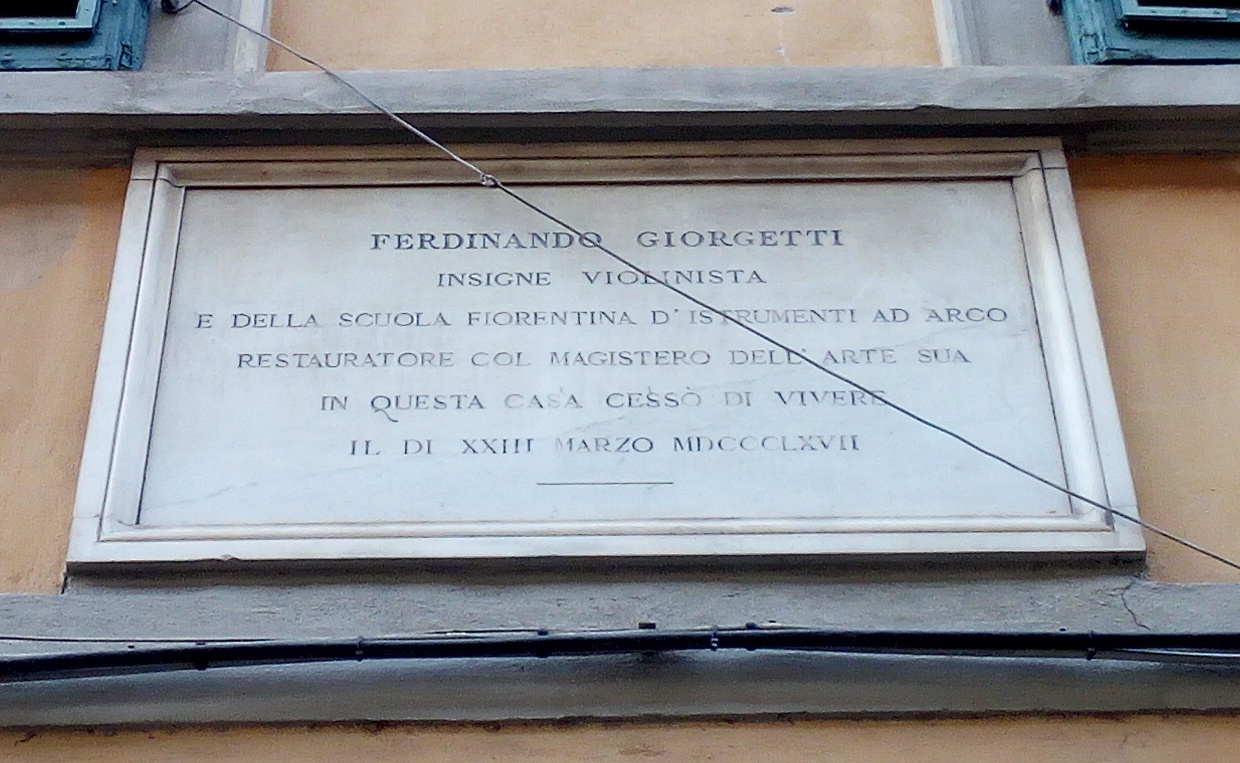
Commemorative plaque placed on the Giorgetti’s villa located at Via Ricasoli 47 in Florence, in front of the entrance to the Galleria dell'Accademia.

In 1828, the fame of Giorgetti as a composer, teacher, and publicist was established in Florence because he most furiously participated in a written debate regarding German influence in the didactics of Italian music. In the periodicals, space was given to the prevalent idea that there was an excessive penetration of German taste inside the classrooms of the conservatories, while Giorgetti, on the contrary, affirmed that the study of Germans of the Classical period (Mozart, Haydn and Beethoven) was instead essential in acquiring the necessary knowledge that permitted Italian singability to be expressed well. Giorgetti proposed a sort of union between German and Italian style, which in this era were considered to be incompatible. He pointed to Gioachino Rossini as the ultimate example of that union. Rossini was taught through German examples during his education in Bologna; indeed, he was given the nickname “"il tedeschino" (the little German). Giorgetti was given the nickname “il tedescone" (the big German) for his fondness of Teutonic artistry. That fondness found fertile ground in the Germanophile Tuscany, ruled by Habsburg-Lorraine. In 1827, on the frontispiece of Tre trj di una difficoltà progressiva (dedicated to Paganini) he indicates «first violin of the court of the Grand Duke of Tuscany», and thanks to the support of the court (members to which Giorgetti dedicated numerous compositions), he began promoting instrumental music and cultured European musical language, an activity to which he dedicated all of his energy as a composer, teacher and orchestral conductor.

=== Preference for the quartet ===
The quartet was a privileged object of interest in his work, and was, at that time, used infrequently by Italian composers. He considered the quartet to be the maximum expression of the art of music (and believes to be heir of the great European approach to the quartet, which at the time a myth considered created in Italy). He promoted many performances of quartets (often for their first Italian performance), as well as for private events organized by Giorgetti himself, which were often held at his house (in Via Ricasoli in Florence). In addition, he created incentives for popularized the genre with arrangements from the great German quartets, and he himself composed eight string quartets. However, Giorgetti didn’t disregard other genres of instrumental and symphonic music, and like many orchestral conductors (one of the last “director-violinists”, before becoming solely a conductor like Teodulo Mabellini, his compatriot and contemporary, and Angelo Mariani), performed sacred masterpieces by Haydn and Rossini in Florence in order to demonstrate that a same substance connected both German and Italian tradition. In addiction, Giorgetti rediscovered numerous composers of the past.

=== Affinity to other composers ===
His commitment gained favor of many composers, from Louis Spohr to François-Joseph Fétis, from Antonio Bazzini to Giovanni Pacini, to Giuseppe Poniatowski, to whom Giorgetti dedicated works and offered hospitality in his villa in Via Ricasoli. He maintained sincere friendships with Niccolò Paganini, for whom he composed many pieces for violin, with Franz Liszt, who he met in Florence in 1838 and, above all, with Gioacchino Rossini. When he was a guest of Giorgetti’s in Florence, Rossini was at the mercy of his depression and nervous crises, which Giorgetti tried to help remedy by showing Rossini his own greater suffering caused by his paralysis.

=== Refusal of opera ===
The national tendency of the public, however, remained that of developing a passion for lyric opera instead of for instrumental music, which was a fact that threw Giorgetti into a rage. He stigmatized the exaggerated patronage of opera of his compatriots, and believed that the young Giuseppe Verdi was a corruptor of Italian musical traditions, and that Ricordi publishers was a guilty accomplice (in 1856 Giorgetti also interrupted his fine and at that point good relations with the Milanese publisher because of his operatic inclination).

=== Teaching ===
He continued to promote instrumental music throughout his life, both as a teacher and as a publicist. Some of his students were Luigi Bicchierai, Luigi Laschi, Carlo Verardi and Jefte Sbolci, to whom he dedicated many studies and for whom he wrote a few methods (the most famous is the method for viola written in 1854, and then printed again by Ricordi in 1902).

=== The Rivista Musicale of Florence: influence on Basevi ===
In 1840, he founded the «Rivista Musicale di Firenze» (Musical Magazine of Florence), which was the first Italian periodical completely dedicated to music. He didn’t write critiques, but rather philosophical reflections of music, very similar to those of Giuseppe Mazzini expressed in Filosofia della musica (Philosophy of music) in 1836. Giorgetti’s opinions very much inspired the ideas of Abramo Basevi, one of the protagonists in the Florentine musical scene. Together, Giorgetti and Basevi created large instrumental organizations, among which were Mattinate beethoveniane (concerts that brought the Tuscan reception of Beethoven to the forefront and which were first performed in front of his house in Via Ricasoli, in 1859, and then at the Lemonnier Institute in via S. Egidio), Concerti popolari (created by Basevi and Teodulo Mabellini in 1863), and Società del quartetto (with the publisher Giovanni Gualberto Guidi), which in 1861 finally made Giorgetti’s dream of having a Florentine “house” for the quartet come true. In fact, he dedicated his last Settimo quartetto to the Società.

=== Last years ===
Getting weaker and weaker from his paralysis, he became interested in the destiny of old musicians. He donated many of his earning to institutions that offer assistance. His involvement as a teacher and publicist continued almost until his death, but he almost completely ceased to compose after 1862. He died in his house in Via Ricasoli in 1867.

== Works and sources ==
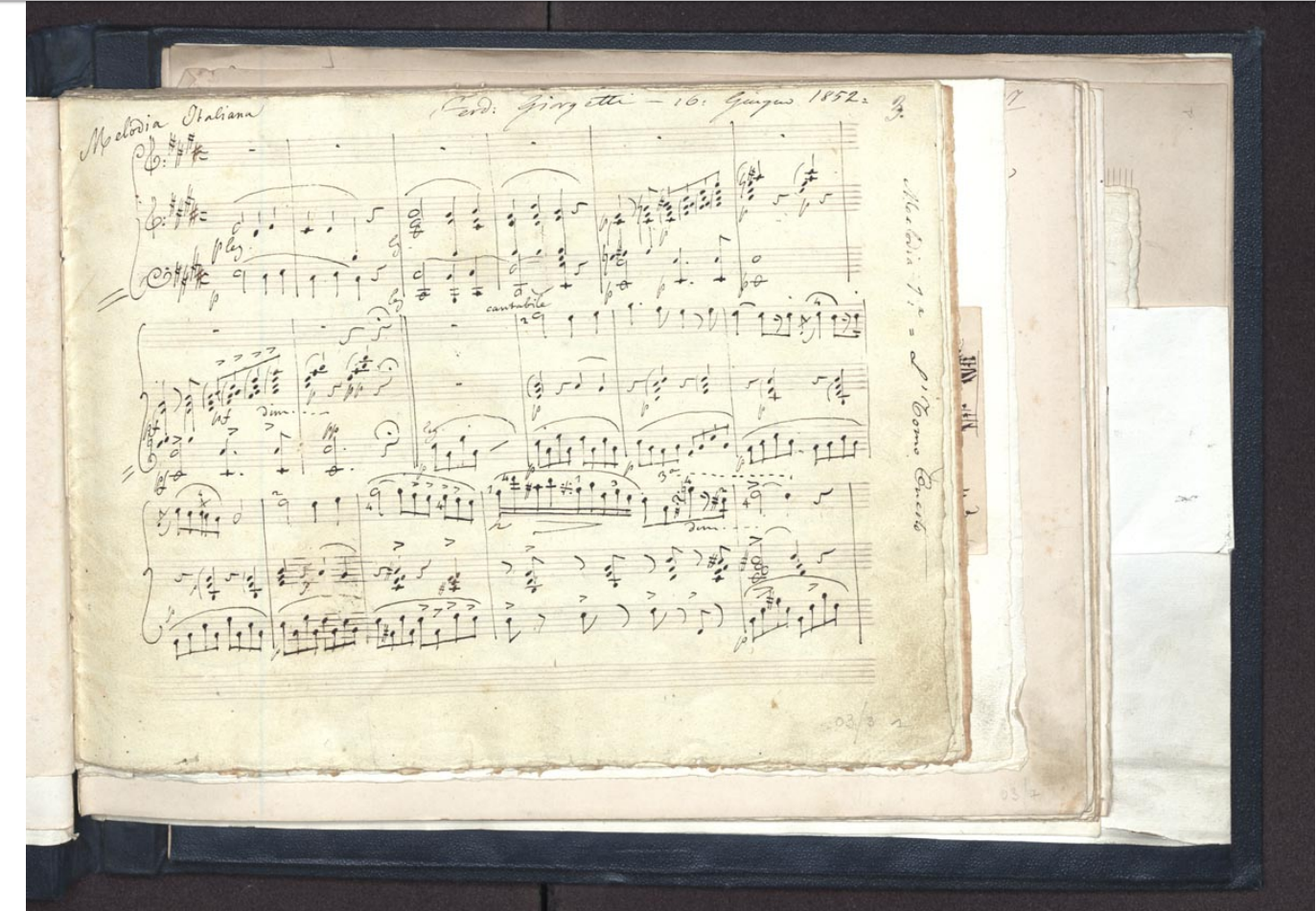
First page of the autograph of the Melodia italiana of Ferdinando Giorgetti (1796-1867), preserved at the Conservatorio di Firenze. Entirely digitalized on Internet Culturale

Giorgetti mostly composed for violin (2 concerti) and for strings (eight quartets and numerous pieces for two violins, and violin and viola), but he also dedicated his time to sacred music with messe and oratorios, and some symphonic experiments. He arranged many themes by Vincenzo Bellini, Wolfgang Amadeus Mozart and Louis Spohr for strings. He also composed songs for soprano, as well as compositions for harp, piano, clarinet and flute (the concerto from 1818).

=== Autographs ===
The institution that preserves the greatest number of his autographs is the Conservatory Luigi Cherubini in Florence followed by the Palatina Library in Parma, and the Royal Conservatory of Music in Brussels. In Brussels, at the Royal Library of Belgium, you can also find the autograph of the third quartet, which Giorgetti dedicated to Fétis. The autograph of the Ouverture I, dated 1840 and dedicated to Poniatowski, was found by the pianist Gregorio Nardi in Florence and today is looked after in his private Florentine archive. The Pacini Collection of the Carlo Magnani Library in Pescia, and the Conservatories of Brussels and Florence all look after an autographed copy of Dies Irae, the only piece that remains of the Messa da Requiem which Giorgetti dedicated to Giovanni Pacini in 1843: on the frontispiece of these documents, there is a note from the composer which indicated how counterfeit copies are made lacking his autograph. The Philharmonic Academy of Bologna preserves the autograph of the Gran quintetto, at one time dedicated by Giorgetti to the librarian Masseangelo Masseangeli, then published by Ricordi in 1847 and rededicated first to the students and then to Poniatowski. The Greggiati Collection in Ostiglia contains the autograph of the Ave Maria, op. 35 in a version arranged for orchestra (the autograph of the original version for piano, harp or quartet is at the Conservatory of Florence). The autograph of the seventh quartet for strings was only recently discovered at Carnegie Mellon University in Pittsburgh.

=== Manuscripts ===
The majority of the contemporary manuscripts of his work are at the Conservatory of Florence and the Hofburgkapelle in Vienna. After which, manuscripts are found at the Noseda Collection of the Conservatory of Milan, the Capitolary Archive in Pistoia, the Sasso Collection at the Accademia Santa Cecilia of Rome, the Paganini Conservatory of Genoa, and Arezzo Historic Archive. A unique contemporary copy of Giorgetti’s works are preserved at the Biblioteca Nazionale Marciana in Venice, in the Greggiati Collection in Ostiglia, at the Biblioteca Statale in Cremona, at the Biblioteca Domenicini in Perugia, at the Conservatorio San Pietro a Majella in Naples, and, abroad, at the Abteilung Musik, Theater, Film della Universitätsbibliothek «Johann Christian Senckenberg» in Frankfurt, at the Sibley Music Library part of the Eastman School of Music of the University of Rochester (New York), and in the Galeazzi Collection at the Irving Gilmore Music Library at Yale University in New Haven (Connecticut).

=== Printed editions ===
The greatest number of first editions printed with the works of Giorgetti are at the Conservatory in Florence. Given Giorgetti’s longlasting relationship with Ricordi, many first editions of his works are also in Milan, at the Giuseppe Verdi Conservatory.The Biblioteca Nazionale Marciana in Venice preserves 12 first editions of his. Following, by number of examples, are: the Greggiati Collection in Ostiglia, the Institute of music Vecchi & Tonelli in Modena, the Accademia Santa Cecilia in Rome, the Conservatory of Naples, the Conservatory of Brescia, the Conservatory of Pesaro, the National Library in Florence, the Conservatory of Bergamo, the Biblioteca Palatina in Parma, the Conservatory of Bologna, the Conservatory of Perugia, the Conservatory of Rome, the Capitolary Archive in Pistoia, the Bibliothèque Royale de Belgique in Bruxelles, the Conservatory of Liegi, the Bayerische Staatsbibliothek in Monaco and the Library of Congress in Washington D.C. The following preserve only one copy of a first edition of an opera: the Conservatory in Verona, the Accademia Filarmonica in Bologna, the Biblioteca Aurelio Saffi in Forlì, the Scuola di Musica di Fiesole, the Accademia Chigiana in Siena, the Historic Archive of Arezzo, the Biblioteca di Archeologia e Storia dell'Arte di Palazzo Venezia in Rome, the private archive of Claudio Paradiso in Latina, the Library of the University of Reading (England), the Liszt Ferenc Zenemüvészeti Föiskola Könivtára in Budapest, the Music Division of the Public Library in Lincoln Center in New York, and the Sibley Music Library in Rochester. The first edition from 1856 of his methods for viola is preserved at the Conservatories in Milan, Florence, Bergamo and Rome, at the Biblioteca Comunale in Finale Emilia and at the British Library in London.

== Discography ==
In 1968, the group Sestetto Chigiano d'Archi (Riccardo Brengola, Giovanni Guglielmo, violins; Tito Riccardi, Mario Benvenuti, violas; Alain Meunier, Franco Petracchi, cellos) performed Sestetto n. 3, op. 25 by Georgetti (dedicated to Rossini and printed in Florence by Guidi in 1845; autograph conserved in Conservatoire de Musique de Bruxelles) in the concert hall of Palazzo Chigi-Saracini in Siena, during the local Musical Week. Performance was recorded and the original tape is conserved in the Italian National Discography Institute in Rome. The Institute published the recording in 1989, and now is available on-line on the official site.
