= Luigi Ferdinando Casamorata =

Italian composer and music critic

Luigi Ferdinando Casamorata (15 May 1807 – 24 September 1881) was an Italian composer and music critic.

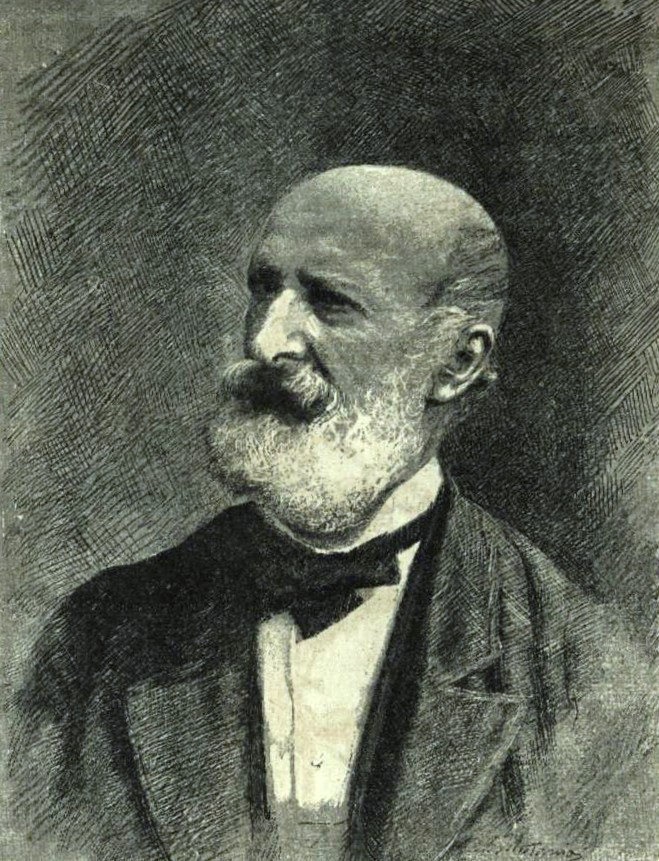
Luigi Ferdinando Casamorata

== Life ==
=== Before 1849 ===
Born in Würzburg in the Grand Duchy of Würzburg (now Bavaria), Casamorata was the son of the Grand Duke's inspector Luigi Giacomo Casamorata, who stayed with the Grand Duke Ferdinando III in exile in Germany. Already when he was seven years old, he moved to Florence and studied piano. In 1825, while he was attending law school at the university, he tried a competition for composition at the Accademia di Belle Arti with Ferdinando Giorgetti. At that point, he attempted a career in the theatre. He composed some ballets, but his attempts to write a comic opera were opposed by the producers, who forced him instead to debut with a dramma, Iginia d'Asti, first seen in Pisa in 1838 but was immediately jeered at in Bologna few months later (see also the section Librettos). There is information regarding two other attempts at dramas, of which there remains no trace. After his theatrical fiasco, he finished his studies in Law (he signed "Avv. Casamorata" for his entire life), but he never abandoned music. However, he became better known as a critic than as a composer. He wrote for Gazzetta musicale di Milano, La Patria, Il Nazionale, and Il Costituzionale, alternating his writing regarding music with political pamphlets.

=== The delusion of the Risorgimento ===
Casamorata participated in the uprising in 1848, but when the Grand Duke Leopoldo II returned to the throne, after the uprising, in 1849 his beliefs were disillusioned and from that moment on, he abandoned being active in the revolt. In this atmosphere of disillusion, he started to alternate journalism with public administrative duties: he was part of the board of directors of the railroad in Livorno, was gonfalonier in Fiesole, and town counselor/representative in Florence.

=== Characteristics as a critic ===
Casamorata was a very traditionalist critic, linked to formalist ideals. He was convinced that the main scope of music was to imitate nature, and many times he would go into a detailed description of technical cerebral aspects. Two of his most famous reviews were those of the debut of Macbeth by Verdi at the Pergola in 1847 (a very long review that was published in the Gazzetta musicale di Milano between 11 April and 2 June 1847), in which he judged the music as pleasant, but defined the libretto as a sequel of "a great deal of rubbish"; and that of the first representation in Italy, at the Pergola in 1843, of Der Freischütz by Carl Maria von Weber, judged as unbalanced between the wind instruments and strings.

=== The debate regarding sacred music ===
He actively participated in the debate regarding the esthetics of sacred music, inaugurated by the Cecilian Movement (with which he actively collaborated in the writing of the Manifest of Sacred Music in 1877). At the beginning he was a permissive and interested observer of all types of church music, but over time he became harsher, almost to the point of intransigence. In fact, he defined the Stabat Mater by Rossini as "un-religious".

=== The promotion of instrumental music ===
Another area that he favoured was the promotion of instrumental music, especially German instrumental music, in Italy. He organized concerts for quartets and symphonies in the large concert halls in his villa located in Via delle Pinzochere (near Santa Croce). He also founded an association for wind instruments, the Società artistico-musicale degli strumenti a fiato, in 1864. In addition, he sought to organize stable orchestras and theatre schools in Florence. In fact, his articles inspired the Philharmonic Association in Florence (from 1859 Teodulo Mabellini was the orchestral director) to perform the works of Haydn, Mozart, Beethoven, Mendelssohn, Wagner, Gounod and Meyerbeer.

=== Conservatory of Florence and the fame of the 1860s and 70s ===
Casamorata joined the music faculty of the Accademia di Belle Arti di Firenze on 2 September 1841 in the post of maestro di cappella. The music school of that academy became the Florence Conservatory (then known as the Istituto Musicale) on 6 August 1849 by a decree from Leopold II, Grand Duke of Tuscany who split the music and art portions of the school into distinct branches of the same institution and appointed Giovanni Pacini the conservatory's first director. In 1859 Casamorata joined with Abramo Basevi and Girolamo Alessandro Biaggi to organize a plan to separate the school into its own separate institution. By royal decree of Victor Emmanuel II the school was entirely separated from the academy and became its own independent institution on 15 March 1860 with Pacini still as director. When the school's new charter was finalized in 1862 Casamorata was appointed director of the conservatory. He remained in that post until his death in 1881.

Casamorata became an international authority on the history of Italian music: he celebrated for the entire decade of the 1870s concerts that were organized and held in Florence, which attracted artists such as Franz Liszt; talented composers dedicated pieces of music to him (Ferruccio Busoni dedicated hi Op. 21 to him in 1880); publishers called him to revise scores (for example, Giovanni Gualberto Guidi employed him for the publication of the Stabat Mater by Pergolesi in 1877); and his experience was highly sought for the study of Italian operas (in 1874 the Conservatory of Paris turned to him in order to attribute an alleged Cimarosa's opera). He also wrote for the European Encyclopedia (starting in 1877 he collaborated with Arthur Pougin in order to update the Biographie universelle of François-Joseph Fétis. He handled the biographies of Tuscan artists.

=== Collectionist and expert of antique music ===
His fame was solidified when he found the Codice Squarcialupi in the Laurentian Library. From that moment on, he was also considered to be an expert of antique music. He wrote papers about people such as Francesco Nigetti (the inventor of the cembalo a cinque tastiere) and Father Mauro dei Servi di Maria (theorist of the sixteen-hundreds). He curated manuscript editions, collected antique instruments, and compiled papers about out-of-date aspects of performance customs. At his death, he left his own library and his instruments to the Conservatory of Florence. Today, the donated instruments are preserved in the Museum of Musical Instruments in the Galleria dell'Accademia in Florence.

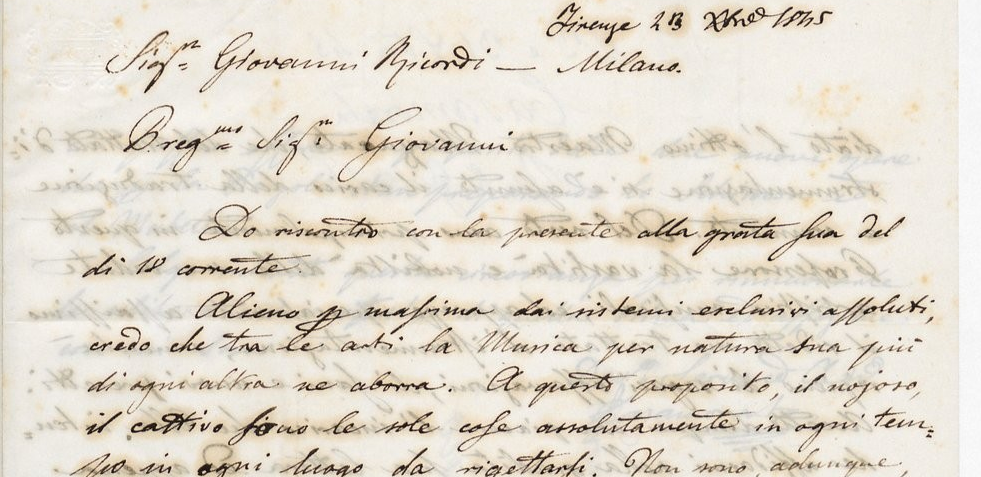
Letter of Luigi Ferdinando Casamorata to Giovanni Ricordi

== Works and sources ==
In addition to three theatrical operas that were unsuccessful, he composed a couple of cantatas, some ballets, instrumental music (a concerto for flute, one for clarinet, 4 symphonies, 2 overtures), various works for chamber music (including the reworked version of themes by Rossini, Bellini, Donizetti, Meyerbeer and Hummel), many works for theory and study (a manual of harmony which was published in Florence, a course for voice which remains only handwritten, a paper regarding musical notation which has been lost, a paper on the construction of the organ which did not oppose the use of electricity, and a historical overview of theatrical costumes), e molta musica sacra, di cui circa 14 messe, molte però rimaste inedite., as well as a lot of sacred music, of which about 14 masses, which, however, remain unedited.

=== Autographs ===
His autographs of sacred music are found in the Archive of the Basilica della Santissima Annunziata; however, because specific studies have not been carried out, the exact number of pieces is unknown. Other autographs are found in the following locations:

- At the Conservatory of Naples:
  - a mass for three voices from 1839
  - a Magnificat dated 1842
  - a mass for three voices dated 1844
  - the second quartet for strings from 1858
  - a symphony from 1859
  - an Ave Maria for four voices from 1871
  - two antiphons for four voices dated 1878
- At the Conservatory of Florence (some are also digitalized):
  - a quartet for pianoforte, clarinet, horn and bassoon (printed by Boosey);
  - a Benedicta dated March 5, 1869
- At the Accademia Filarmonica of Bologna:
  - an Absolve Domine, maybe owned by Masseangelo Masseangeli, dated September 11, 1877

=== Manuscript copies ===
==== Copies in Florence ====
The institution that preserves the greatest number of manuscript copies of Casamorata's works is the Conservatory of Florence:

- the cantata that won the competition in 1825
- a cantata, Beatrice, for the florentine celebration of Dante in 1865
- the instrumental variations on the themes of Hummel, Meyerbeer, Bellini, Donizetti and Hummel
- concerts for flute and clarinet
- some pieces for oboe, with piano accompaniment or orchestra
- exercises for organ dated 1874
- pieces that survived of his ballets
- chamber music (at least four quartets and one trio)
- orchestral pieces (preludes, the ouverture op. 2, symphony n. 3)
- dramatic studies (recitives and cavatine, dated from 1836 and 1866)
- collections of pieces by other celebrated composers that Casamorata arranged (or had arranged) for students of the conservatory
- a patriotic song "alla Patria e al Re"
- few religious pieces (a mass and some Armonie religiose to the text of Pietro Metastasio).

The current state of research does not permit us to establish that these copies are autographs with certainty, although we can hypothesize a consistent number, since the number of compositions carried out from the copies conforms with most of the noted works by Casamorata.

==== Other copies ====
Out of Florence, the spread of manuscripts of Casamorata was because of his sacred music. The lack of specific research regarding the musical possessions of Italian parishes doesn’t allow for the affirmation of how extensive the spread of his sacred works is. However, the presence of a collection of his psalms in Turin (Biblioteca del Capitolo Metropolitano), of an Ave Maria in Naples, a Salve Regina in Pistoia and some masses in the archive of the Sant'Antimo Church in Piombino, discovered by Musical Documentation Center of Tuscany, would indicate that the spread of his works is very large.

=== Printed editions ===
He published in Florence (especially with Genesio Venturini and Angiolo Lucherini), Milan (with Giovanni Canti and Ricordi) and also with Parisian (Delanchy) and London-based publishers (Boosey). Many of his sacred compositions circulate in well-known magazines. The Palatina Library in Parma has the first edition (around 1831) of the Variazioni per pianoforte on a theme from Sonnambula by Bellini, printed by Artaria (Milan) and Lucherini (Florence), work that was published in the variation for harp by Ricordi. Other printed editions have been found at the Conservatory of Florence (the institution that preserves the greatest number), the Conservatory in Milan and in Brescia, the National Library of Florence, the Accademia di Santa Cecilia di Roma, the Accademia Filarmonica and the Museo Internazionale e Biblioteca della Musica di Bologna, and the Biblioteca Nazionale Marciana di Venezia.

=== Librettos ===
The libretto of Iginia d'Asti, the only opera of his that exists today, is preserved in two versions: published by the printer named Pieraccini from Pisa following the first performance, and the other published by Della Volpe al Sassi, following the fiasco in Bologna. Both are dated 1838 (see the paragraph Before 1849). The version by Pieraccini is at the National Library in Florence, at the Cini Foundation in Venice, and at the Palatina Library in Parma. The version by Della Volpe is at the Cini Foundation, at the Archiginnasio and the Conservatory of Bologna, at the Biblioteca Comunale Centrale of Milan, at the Saffi Library in Forlì, at the Library of Ravenna and at the Bayerische Staatsbibliothek in Munich.

=== Modern editions ===
The Paideia publishers of Brescia and Bärenreiter of Kassel printed one of his complete masses, Messa completa, in 1981

== Letters ==
One of his letters to Ricordi from 1845 is preserved at the French National Library.

== Recordings ==
- In July 1997, at the Brüdernkirche in Braunschweig, the organist Hans-Dieter Karras recorded, together with other pieces, a Complete Mass for organ by Casamorata for the recording label Prospect.
- In 2003, the organist Klemens Schnorr performed the same mass (together with other pieces) on the organ of the Cattedrale di Saragozza for a CD distributed by the recording label Motette (Harmonia Mundi) in 2006.
- In November 2014, in the Basilica di San Lorenzo in Florence, the organists Antonio Tronci, Filippo Tronci and Gabriele Giacomelli performed a concert for organ composed in Florence from the 16th century to 19th century, which also included two pieces by Casamorata. The concert was recorded and distributed as a CD by the recording label named Tactus in 2015.
