= Bianca Milesi =

Italian patriot, writer and painter (1790–1849)

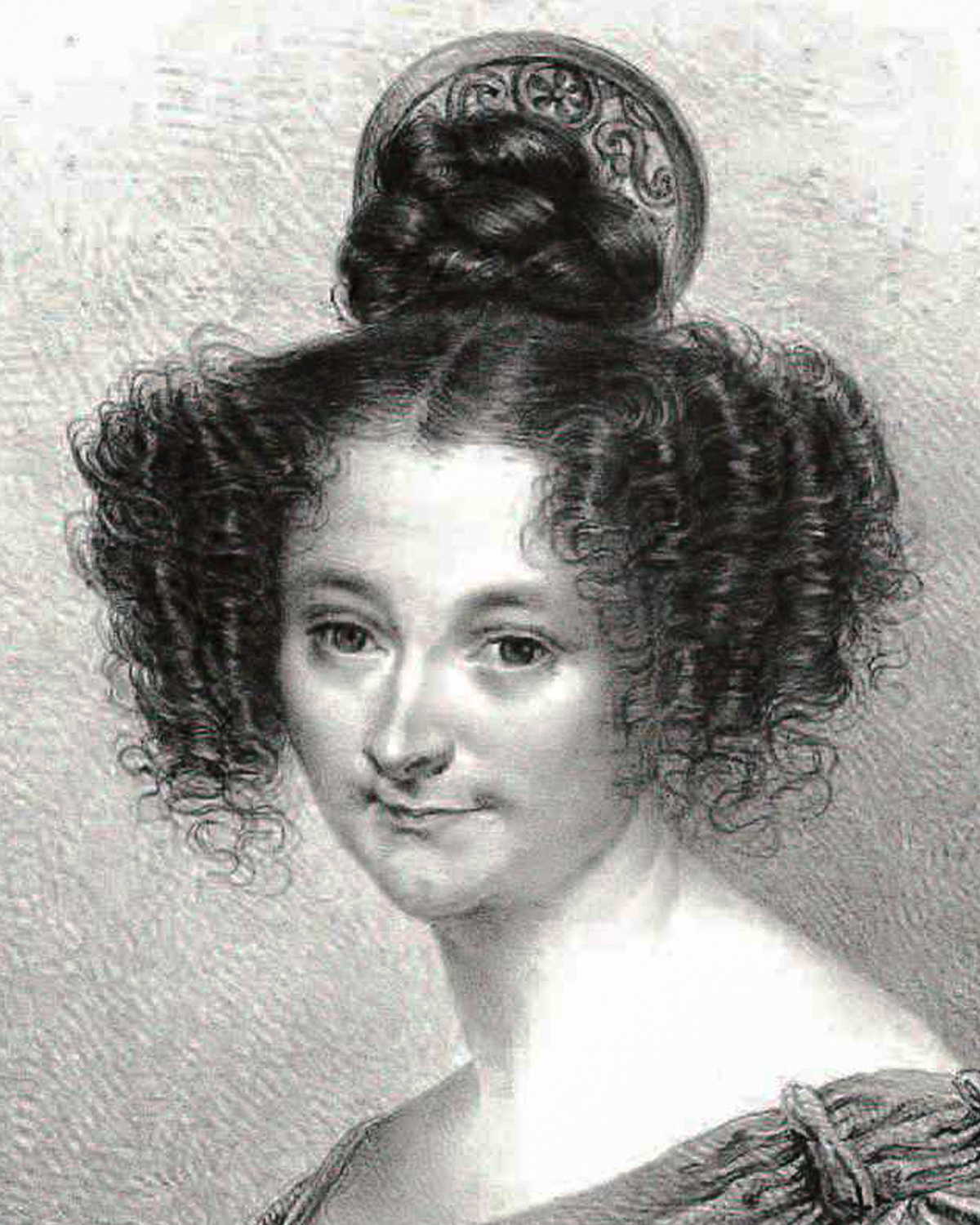
Portrait of Bianca Milesi by Camilla Guiscardi Gandolfi

Bianca Milesi Mojon (May 22, 1790 – June 8, 1849) was an Italian patriot, writer and painter. She also trained girls to become interested in the arts.

== Biography ==
Bianca Milesi was born into a family of wealthy merchants in Milan, daughter of Giovan Battista Milesi and Elena Viscontini. She had four sisters, Antoinette, Francesca, Agostina, Louise, and a brother, Charles, who would join in marriage with his cousin Elena Viscontini, sister of Matilda. She was brought up from six to ten years in a convent in Florence, in Milan in the monasteries of St. Sophia and the Holy Spirit, and finally with a governess. A journey made together with her mother in Tuscany and Switzerland gave her the opportunity to broaden her horizons and study the philosophy of the Enlightenment.

Even after returning to Milan, she continued to travel, periodically visiting Florence and Rome. In Florence he met the Countess of Albany Princess Louise of Stolberg-Gedern, who had been the mistress of Vittorio Alfieri. In Rome she came into relationship with Antonio Canova and the German painter Sophie Reinhard.

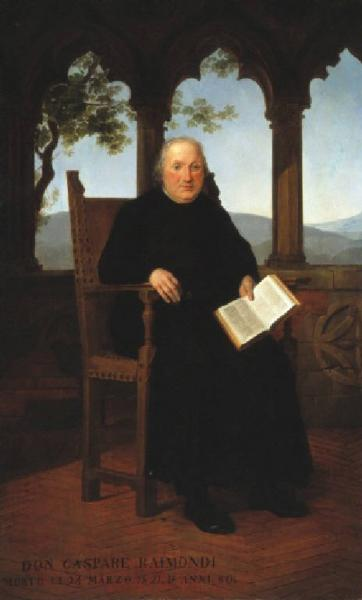
Portrait of Gaspare Raimondi by Bianca Milesi, Ospedale Maggiore, 1821

She had a leading role in the Carbonari uprisings in Milan in 1821. She later went on to become a drawer and painter, and taught at schools, particularly training girls to become interested in the arts. She died in Paris on June 8, 1849.

== Sources ==
- Souvestre Émile Blanche Milesi-Mojon. Biographical Angers, Cosnier and Lachèse 1854
- Carlo Cattaneo, Bianca Milesi Mojon, in published and unpublished works: literary works, Florence, Le Monnier, 1925, p. 474-492
- Maria Teresa Mori, Salotti. 2003. The Sociability of the Elite in Italy in the Nineteenth Century. Rome, Carocci
- Arianna Arisi Rota, Milesi, Bianca, in Biographical Dictionary of Italian, vol. 74, Rome, Italian Encyclopedia Institute, 2010
- Boneschi, Marta. 2010. La donna segreta: storia di Metilde Viscontini Dembowski. Venezia: Marsilio. ISBN 978-88-317-0730-5
