= Teodulo Mabellini =

Italian composer (April 1817–1897)

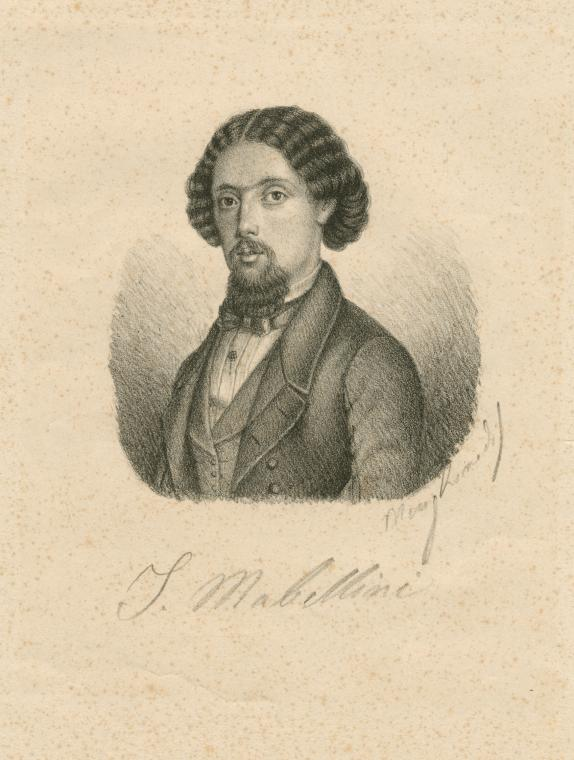
Teodulo Mabellini

Teodulo Mabellini (2 April 1817 – 10 March 1897) was an Italian composer.

== Life ==
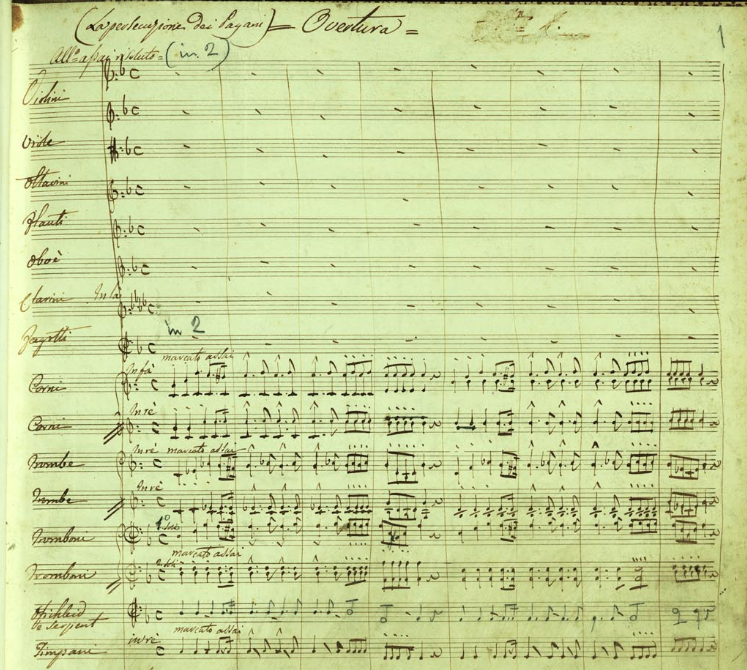
Autograph score of the version of Eudossia e Paolo, conserved at the Conservatory in Florence

=== Early education in Pistoia and Firenze ===
Teodulo Mabellini was the son of Vincenzo, a strumentaio (maker of musical instruments) specialized in wind instruments. He took his very first music lessons from his father and from the flautist, Giovacchino Bimboni, (future music producer of brass instruments). The education he received from these first teachers was critical in forming the unique style of his orchestral compositions. He continued to have contact with Bimboni throughout his entire life, and together they developed a knowledge of composition for winds that was uncommon in this time period (see Style). In 1826, he was a member of the children’s choir (voci bianche) of the Pistoia Cathedral. The local newspapers of the time described him as a genial child prodigy. He continued his studies privately with Giuseppe Pillotti (the organist of the cathedral) and Giuseppe Gherardeschi. He had already, at the age of 12, composed vocal music, chamber music, military marches and band arrangements. In 1832, at the age of 15, Mabellini held a concert of his own compositions (of which only l'Estro armonico remains; the autograph can be found in Pistoia, see Sources) in Pistoia and Grosseto. The success of this concert convinced private citizens to donate “private offerings” so he could attend the Musical Institute in Florence, where he studied from 1833-1836. Immediately after graduating, he was hired as Master of Harpsichord at the Teatro dei Risvegliati in Pistoia and collaborated in productions such as La straniera di Vincenzo Bellini and Anna Bolena by Gaetano Donizetti. The operatic world inspired him to compose his first opera, Matilde e Toledo, which he wrote in only one month when he was just nineteen years old. He was able to have the opera performed at Teatro Alfieri in Florence on August 27, 1836. Its great success astounded the Grand Duke Leopold II of Lorraine, who in return presented Mabellini with a rather large monthly scholarship.

=== Studies with Mercadante and operatic success ===
After having just won his scholarship, he settled in Novara to study with Saverio Mercadante. The Napoletan maestro admired Mabellini’s dedication and talent, and the two remained in great and esteemed relations until Mercadante’s death in 1870. During his studies, Mercadante entrusted Mabellini with the reduction of voice and piano of Le illustri rivali, and brought Mabellini with him as the supervisor of the staging of many of his works in other cities, but especially in Venice. With Mercadante as his mentor, Mabellini developed his skills in sacred music as well, and composed a Mass, which was performed in Novara in 1838. In order to show his gratitude to the Grand Duke for the incredible opportunity to study with Mercadante, Mabellini dedicated the cantata La partenza per la caccia to him in 1839. In 1840, his lyric opera Rolla, which is considered to be Mabellini’s greatest operatic success and composed under the supervision of Mercadante, was staged in Torino (at Teatro Carignano). Rolla received the approval of the famous librettist Felice Romani and of the legendary pianist Carl Czerny, who reduced the main themes into a fantasia for piano. On the wave of his success, Mabellini was able to enter into the circle of the great impresario Alessandro Lanari, who, from then until 1857, guaranteed Mabellini the best productions and theater companies of their time. As a result of this new support, he wrote Ginevra di Firenze in one go (1841, for the Carignano of Turin), which was an opera that was reworked many times (the final version was entitled Ginevra degli Almieri), and Il conte di Lavagna, written on his return to Pistoia in 1842, dedicated to the Grand Duke, and performed with all honors at the Pergola in Florence in 1843.

=== The fiasco of I Veneziani a Costantinopoli, the Florentine Cappella, and sacred music ===
His operatic achievement suffered a temporary stop with the fiasco of I veneziani a Costantinopoli in Rome in 1844 (also the autograph of this opera has been lost, see Sources) From then on, Mabellini remained in Florence. He married Gabriella Ferrari, daughter of a Florentine pharmacist, in 1846, and wrote his last opera seria, Maria di Francia, on his honeymoon (performed at the Pergola in 1846) before accepting numerous commissions by the Grand Duke. The new commissions were for sacred music above all (many cantate for local celebrations: Eudossia e Paolo for the patron of San Giovanni, L'ultimo giorno di Gerusalemme for various Florentine religious institutes), which were so well received that in 1847 he received the nomination of Master of the Court Cappella. Mabellini was the last composer honored with this title (after the escape of Habsburg-Lothringen in 1859, the Cappella was not reinstated again), and was conformed to the desire to introduce sacred German compositions those in Tuscany. He often performed liturgical works, for the first time in Italy, of foreign composers such as Mozart, Albrechtsberger, Hoffmann and Krommer. For the Cappella, from 1847 to 1859, Mabellini composed a large quantity of sacred music, becoming a sort of champion of the genre, and with his compositions he actively engaged in the debate on style and the correct way to compose a mass. This was a debate, which originated in those years, and one that argued for the return to a kind of purity of church music contrasting a pronounced theatrical style. Mabellini continued to dedicate himself to sacred music even after 1859, and produced a huge number of sacred compositions, which rendered him one of the most appreciated composers of this genre in his era. At the Cappella, there was an excellent instrumental ensemble composed of his previous maestro Bimboni, and other professionals such as flautist Cesare Ciardi, horn player Francesco Paoli, and trumpet player Enea Brizzi (each of whom was considered to be the best in their instrument at the time). With this ensemble, he was able to shape his orchestral composition style (see Style): especially for these artists, he wrote Gran fantasia for flute, clarinet, French horn, trumpet, trombone, and string orchestra, which today is found in Florence and Fano (see Sources).

=== The Pergola and the Risorgimento ===
His great work at the Cappella convinced the Grand Duke to nominate Mabellini as Director of the Pergola Theater in 1848. Here, he was respected as professional conductor of an orchestra, one of the first true conductors (not instrumentalists), and one of the first in Italy, alongside Angelo Mariani, able to define himself both concertatore and conductor. His choices regarding the artistic direction continued with the Florentine tradition, but began to open up to foreign Romantic experiments, and he staged many operas by Giacomo Meyerbeer, Charles Gounod and Richard Wagner, but perhaps for political reasons, he didn’t neglect the operas by Giuseppe Verdi; for example, he staged La battaglia di Legnano in the middle of the First Italian War of Independence. In spite of the absence of patriotic allusions in his theatrical works, as well as in the commissions by the Grand Duke, Mabellini demonstrated his spirit of the Risorgimento on other occasions. In 1847, one year before the beginning of the bourgeois revolution, a time which is flooded with patriotic choirs, Mabellni wrote L'Italia risorta, a compositions that precedes Michele Novaro’s setting to music of Canto degli Italiani by Goffredo Mameli by only a few months, as well as the attempt by Giuseppe Verdi to put Mazzini's Suona la tromba to music. In the same year, Mabellini also set the Inno all'Italia: sorgi depressa Italia to music, and in 1859 he wrote a mass for the fallen soldiers of the Battle of Curtatone and Montanara, which was performed in the Basilica of Santa Croce. His political behavior was, however, always moderate; for example, he found some of the anti-aristocrat opinions to be exaggerated, he defended many composers who remained in contact with Austria and therefore liable of accusations of reactionary behavior, and he always remained friends of the Grand Duke. Probably he daydreamed about a Risorgimento led by Leopold II and not by Victor Emanuel, a Risorgimento with Tuscany in charge of unification and not Piedmont. In Florence others wished the same, for example Giovan Pietro Vieusseux and Daniele Manin. Mabellini wrote an Inno nazionale toscano (Tuscan National Anthem) in 1858, according with his fantasy of a Tuscan Risorgimento (the anthem was published by Lorenzi).

=== The end of his theatrical career, the Philharmonic Society and teaching ===
He continued to create new music, and in 1851 he composed a Messa da Requiem which was extremely successful all over Europe and a comic opera Il venturiero (performed in Livorno in 1851). For the Pergola, he composed a sacred drama Baldassarre in 1852, and in 1857 he wrote, with the collaboration of Luigi Gordigiani, the comic opera Fiammetta. This final comic opera marked the end of his compositions for the theater. From that moment on he sacrificed his operatic career, and dedicated himself to composing sacred music, organizing events, orchestral conducting, and teaching. With Abramo Basevi, he became the most important musician in the city. From 1859 to 1887, he taught composition at the same Musical Institute from which he had previously graduated. Some of his students were Salvatore Auteri Manzocchi, Emilio Usiglio, Gaetano Palloni (1831-1892), Luigi and Marino Mancinelli, Guido Tacchinardi, Ettore De Champs, Luigi Bicchierai and Melesio Morales . In 1859, he became the director of the Philharmonic Society. Here, often with the first national performances, he decisively contributed to the diffusion in Tuscany and Italy of Austrian and German classical composers (Haydn, Mozart, Beethoven, Mendelssohn, Wagner) as well as some French (Gounod e Meyerbeer).

=== The Italian Kingdom, celebrations of Dante, and the Concerti popolari ===
The annexation to the Italian Kingdom, although inspiring some personal drama (see preceding paragraphs), didn’t cause him to decrease his activities; on the contrary, he also composed for the Savoy (e.g. the Feste fiorentine for the arrival of Vittorio Emanuele II to Florence in 1860, and Ave Maria for Princess Margherita in 1867) and participated in the Savoy cultural unification policy, with a peak in the period when the capital was transferred to Florence (1865-1870). Some of the first events of “Italian” Florence were: the celebration of the 600-year birthday of Dante Alighieri in 1865, which Mabellini actively contributed to with his cantata Lo spirito di Dante, the first performance of the Sinfonia Dante by Giovanni Pacini, conducted by Mabellini at the Pergola. From 1863 to 1880, Mabellini was called by Basevi to direct the Concerti popolari, during which numerous lyric operas and symphonies were performed in the Salone dei Cinquecento in Palazzo Vecchio and at the new Pagliano Theater. Created by Basevi, Ferdinando Giorgetti, and publisher Giovanni Gualberto Guidi, the Concerti popolari were the pinnacle of the ten years spent constructing a space for big productions and often enormous concerts capable of allowing the masses to come closer to music. The repertoire was composed of not only proclaimed Italian successes (who brought many operas that had been absent from the Florentine lyric scene back on stage, which was greatly appreciated by the home audience who created the proverb “Bellini is dead, but Ma-bellini is alive!”, but also numerous foreign words (especially those of Meyerbeer, but also of Haydn, Mendelssohn, Schubert e Weber). It was here that there was a meeting of tastes of the nourished cosmopolitan Florentine community, which was thickened precisely by the eco international aspect of the celebrations of Dante and of the urban renovation of Giuseppe Poggi for the transfer of the capital.

=== The burial of Rossini ===
In 1868, Mabellini accepted the summons of Giuseppe Verdi for a collective composition, by the most important Italian composers, of a Requiem for the death of di Gioacchino Rossini. He contributed with the Lux aeterna, but the project initiated by Verdi remained unfinished, and for the burial of Rossini in the Basilica of Santa Croce, a few months after the funeral in Paris, Mabellini performed Mozart's Requiem, with serious limits imposed by the Archbishop, who prohibited women from the choir (they were substituted at the last minute by a children’s choir from Lucca). Mabellini also dedicated the cantata Feste rossiniane from 1873 (performed at the Pagliano Theater) to Rossini.

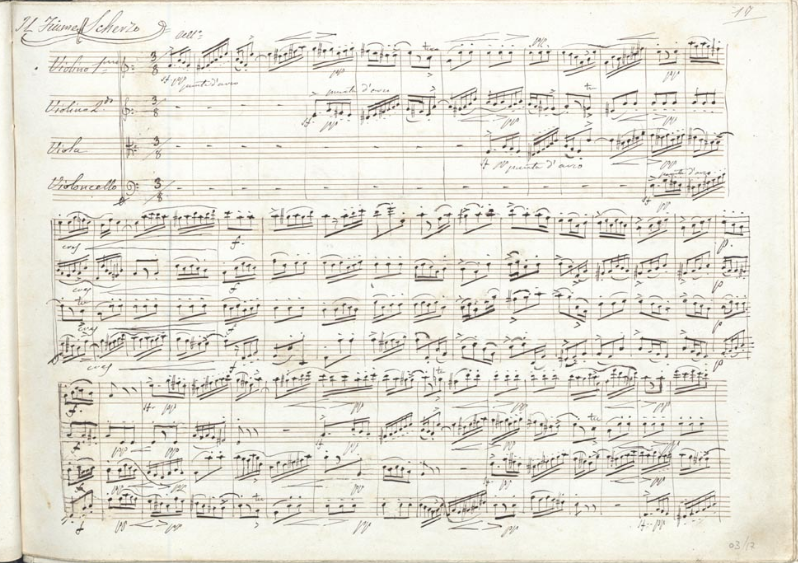
Autograph of the scherzo Il fiume (1870), conserved in Florence

=== Last years and death ===
Between 1870 and 1871 he was considered, along with many other composers such as Giuseepe Verdi, for the position of successor to Maestro Mercadante in the management of San Pietro a Majella Conservatory on Naples, which was given to Lauro Rossi in the end. In 1874, he was fired by the Philharmonic Society after thirty years of contribution, and replaced by Jefte Sbolci. From that moment on, Mabellini began a sort of decline. He expressed the desire to compose new operas, but the librettists found him to be outdated after having been absent from the theatrical scene for almost twenty year. This was a feeling also shared with the impresari (managers) who resumed his past success with mediocre secondary theater companies, which was a trend that the old maestro (Mabellini) couldn’t oppose. In 1874, he composed a Danza dei folletti, and in 1878 he wrote the cantata Michelangelo Buonarroti, but from then on, he found little support even in publishing (two of his editors, Guidi from Florence and Lucca from Milan, who also found themselves in a downfall, which eventually brought them to the merger with Tito Ricordi). In 1880, he donated a mass to the Conservatory of Naples (see Sources), and continued to find commissions by aristocrats for a while (a Messa for the Duke of San Clemente in 1882, a Coro per voci bianche e pianoforte for the Demidoff family in 1885). He also composed for the city (the Inno all'Arte for the unveiling of the new face of the Duomo by Emilio De Fabris in 1886), before abandoning compositions altogether in 1887 (this was the year of his last composition: a cantata based on a character of Dante’s for Ugo Martini, see Sources). From then on, even though in retirement, he continued to preside over some exams at the Musical Institute until 1894, when he was struck by a progressive paralysis that restricted him to bed, until his death in 1897.

== Style ==
From a theatrical point of view, he was attracted to the belcanto style; he admired Vincenzo Bellini’s work, of which he directed many Florentine operatic revivals and was fascinated by Gaetano Donizetti. A mutual respect bonded him to Giuseppe Verdi, which is demonstrated in the promotion of Verdi’s operas by Mabellini at the Pergola Theater, their collaboration in the incomplete Messa for Rossini, and the fantasies Mabellini wrote on Verdi’s theme for instruments (see Sources). In some ways, Mabellini developed a serious admiration of Verdi, and at a certain point he almost wanted to consider himself Verdi’s successor before his conducting activities brought him away from the theater in 1857. With regard to sacred music, Mabellini elaborated and matured a classical composition style: Haydn and Mozart were his point of reference in this area, and the conducting positions at the Habsburg Cappella put him in contact with foreigners (Krommer) and previous Italians (for example the sacred production of Benedetto Marcello and Giovanni Battista Martini) as well. We can also trace many influences by Rossini in his later messe. As mentioned in the biography, the sacred music by Mabellini reflects the theoretical oscillation or uncertainty about composing the messe to perfection, which was a point of reflection at the time, and one which he participated in firsthand. His sacred music production, precisely because of its connection to the Zeitgeist was one of the most appreciated of his era. (see also Fortune). One unique characteristic of the compositional style tout court of Mabellini concerns the use of the orchestra. He intended it to be like an ensemble of winds in which the violins were almost always secondary; therefore, he trusted the melodic parts to the wind instruments, which followed a more European practice than Italian one. He was able to compose in this way because of being inspired by the musicians at his disposal in the Florentine Court: Gioacchino Bimboni (trombonist), Cesare Ciardi (flutist), Francesco Paoli (horn player), Enea Brizzi (trumpet player). These professionals, who were committed to the Cappella Orchestra and were also a musical group on their own, were called the Banda della Real Guardia, and were the musicians the Mabellini composed many of his works for (the Gran fantasia of 1846 is actually dedicated to them), and it guaranteed an extremely high-quality standard. It is also thanks to them that Mabellini was able to use the orchestra in a European way. In fact, his ideas regarding the instruments take on orchestral ideas from the other side of the Alps, that came about at the end of the 1700s (implemented above all by Haydn and Mozart and continued by Beethoven, Schubert, Méhul, Weber and Brahms: authors that Mabellini often new thanks to his career as a conductor) and inserted them into the Italian musical atmosphere, in a way that almost anticipated not only Realism (Pietro Mascagni will continue to call the orchestral parts instrumental until his death in 1945, perhaps because of Mabellini’s influence) but also many Post-Romantic European trends (for example Richard Strauss).

== Fortune ==
He was very famous in his time period: the Messa da Requiem of 1851 caused him to receive honors in Spain and in France, and the opera Rolla was performed successfully many times throughout his life. His conducting career rendered him one of the most famous and appreciated people of his time period, also thanks to his production during the time when Florence was the capital. The testimony of the popularity of his compositions is seen in the many elaborations of his operas for marching bands present at the time, as well as the many borrowings and arrangements of his works by other composers. As mentioned previously, Carl Czerny wrote a successful transcription for piano of the themes from Rolla and Antonio Bazzini reduced the same into a composition for voice and piano for Ricordi publishers. In the realm of sacred music, Mabellini remained an international point of reference throughout his life. His biography written by François-Joseph Fétis and Luigi Ferdinando Casamorata in 1863 remembers him both as a composer for opera as a liturgical composer, and in his necrology, he is almost more remembered as a composer of sacred works than as a composer for the theater or as a conductor. However, his cease of production after the Fiammetta in 1857 made him remain in the background of the theatrical world, and he was never able to return to the «A league». In some ways, his friendship with Verdi, ended in a sort of absorption: the old operas by Mabellini, such as Il conte di Lavagna, were devoured analogous opera by Verdi, and the operas that were even older, written before the Risorgimento, were perceived as unfashionable. The audience noticed that the operas of Bellini, Donizetti and Verdi, which Mabellini constantly directed, were similar in style and composition, and therefore ended in concluding that Mabellini was deprived of his own individual style. In performances today, there is no trace of his compositions, neither those that gave his fame during his lifetime nor of his great production of sacred music which has been completely forgotten (so that still today a scientific study of his works, which would allow us to identify and number the many sacred music drafts present in Fano, has not been done. See List of sacred music). In his honor, the public school of music and dance in Pistoia "T. Mabellini" originally founded in 1858 as the School of Violin and other Instruments was renamed after him in 1945.

== Sources ==
Other than his operas, Mabellini wrote a large amount of sacred music (many masses, oratorios, cantatas, and liturgical dramas); cantatas for choir, soloists and orchestra; a ballet; some anthems for the Risorgimento, patriotic songs for Tuscany often commissioned by the Grand Duke and his family; some pieces for celebrations of the Savoy family; at least two symphonies; some compositions for band; various songs; chamber music for different orchestral formations, and also for soloists. The autographs of most of his sacred and celebratory music are found at the Conservatorio di Firenze, because they were the outcome of his position in the Grand Duke’s Cappella. In Florence there are also many printed compositions by the publisher Lorenzi, who was his friend in addition to being the archivist of the conservatory, In Pistoia, the autographs that his daughter, Eudossia, donated to her father’s birthplace in 1916 are preserved. The institution, however, that preserved the greatest number of Mabellini’s works with more than 100 autograph compositions (with many preparatory rough drafts) is the Federiciana Library in Fano. Mabellini was also fortunate to have good relations with publishers, not only the many Florentine publishers, but also Ricordi and Lucca from Milan, and Richault in Paris; a fact that guaranteed the circulation of printed copies of his word throughout Italy.

=== Autographs ===
==== Federiciana Library in Fano ====
The autographs of the Federiciana Library in Fano were preserved thanks to Mabellini’s nephew, Adolfo, director of the library at the moment of his uncle’s death. The library possesses, as aforementioned, the majority of the autographs, as well as many drafts, and even an attempt at an autobiography that was left unfinished. In the collection, the autographs of the operas I veneziani a Costantinopoli (the only operatic fiasco by Mabellini) and Il Venturiero (written for Livorno in 1851 with Luigi Gordigiani) are not found. It is assumed that they can be found in the Archive of the impresario Alessandro Lanari, but still today, they are untraceable. Also the autographs of Ginevra degli Almieri, Il convito di Baldassarre and Fiammetta are also patchy and incomplete (see also List of operas)

==== The autographs in Pistoia ====
Mabellini’s daughter, Eudossia, donated a large number of manuscripts, many of which are autographs, to the city of Pistoia in 1916. Those manuscripts are now preserved in two institutions in Pistoia:

- The Archivio Capitolare (The Capitulary Archive) possesses the following autographs:
  - of the early Estro armonico for orchestra, with the signing «composed in Arezzo on 16 June 1832»,
  - of the Messa da Requiem of 1851, which rendered Mabellini famous even abroad anche. It was published by Richault in Paris in 1853,
  - a Waltz for violin, flute, clarinet, horn, trombone and bass,
  - of the last compositions of Mabellini: the cantata about Dante for tenor, dedicated to Ugo Martini, dated 2 April 1887;
- The Forteguerriana Library preserved the autographs
  - of Bouquet Musical de Florence, containing 12 pieces for voice (from soprano to bass) dedicated to the most well known singers of the time (for example, Marianna Barbieri-Nini, Giulia Grisi and Napoleone Moriani), which was published and printed by Simon Richault in Paris in 1855 (the twelfth, titled Estasi, was circulated as well by an American publisher named Schirmer). Printed examples by Richault can be found in the conservatories in Florence and Rome,
  - the first act of the opera Il conte di Lavagna. The other two acts are located in Fano. The opera was published by Ricordi in Milan (who also provided the sale of the versions for voice and piano) and by the Galletti Printing Press in Florence in 1843,
  - the march for the military marching band Etruria, dedicated by Mabellini to the «Civica Pistoia» (Pistoia community) in 1841 (of which the drafts are found in Fano),
  - the symbolic cantata Le feste fiorentine, performed in the Salone dei Cinquecento in 1860 for the arrival Vittorio Emanuele II in Florence, which was then published by the following publishers: Lorenzi, Mariani (of Florence) and for the version for voice and piano, by Lucca (Milan),
  - the reduction for voice and piano of the ouverture of Eudossia e Paolo. This reduction was also printed by Lorenzi in Florence.

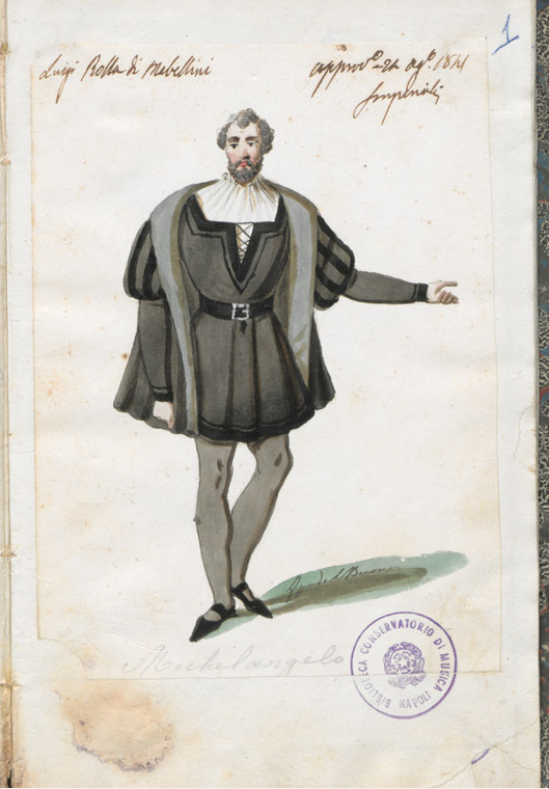
Sketch by Filippo Del Buono for the Neapolitan revival of Rolla in 1841, conserved at the Conservatorio di San Pietro a Majella

==== Other autographs ====
- Conservatorio Luigi Cherubini of Florence preserves the following autographs
  - the scherzo Il fiume, dated 1870,
  - a copy of an autograph reduction of the sacred cantata Eudossia e Paolo,
  - the anthem Sommo Iddio la cui provvida mano, dedicated «al Granduca e alla sua famiglia»,
  - an autograph transcription for piano of the Marce per musica militare e tamburi,
  - a mottetto O gloriosa virginum for choir and orchestra,
  - a probable autograph of the Partenza per la caccia, written in 1836 and dedicated to the Grand Duke Leopoldo II in 1839,
  - the allegoric cantata Il ritorno, to the text of Francesco Guidi, dedicated to the vacation of the Grand Duke in Poggio a Caiano, dated «September 1846»,
  - eight romanze for voice and piano,
  - a Miserere per la Settimana Santa, composed with a Benedictus Christus,
  - an Ecce Sacerdos magnus, for the arrival of Pope Pius IX in Florence on 18 August 1857 (a piece often mistakenly attributed to Gioacchino Maglioni). A copy is also found in Fano
  - an Unguentum in capite for mixed choir and orchestra, still for the arrival of Pio IX in August 1857. One copy is also found in Fano,
  - a Gran Fantasia for flute, clarinet, horn, trumpet, trombone and orchestra, commissioned by the Grand Duke in 1846 that Mabellini wrote for the instrumentalists of the cappella Gioacchino and Giovanni Bimboni, Cesare Ciardi, Enea Brizzi, and Francesco Paoli. A copy is also found in Fano,
  - manuscripts parts (maybe autographs) of a transcription by Mabellini of the Russian national anthem;
- The Conservatorio San Pietro a Majella of Naples possesses
  - an autograph copy of a mass that Mabellini specifically dedicated to the institute in 1880,
  - an Allegretto and a Gloria of a Messa that Mabellini dedicated to his friend Francesco Florimo for his personal album of unedited pieces,
  - a copy perhaps prepared by Mabellini himself for the Napoletan representation of the opera Rolla, dated 1841, of which the institute preserves also some original drafts by Filippo Del Buono,
  - the introduction of the first act of the opera Il conte di Lavagna, donated by Mabellini to the «illustrious Mercadante»;
- the Conservatorio Giuseppe Verdi of Milan and the Archive of the publishing house Ricordi possess the autograph and many manuscripts of parts for the opera Rolla. The publishing house also conserves parts, in various sizes, of the incomplete Messa for Rossini wanted by Verdi, of which the drafts are in Fano;
- The Accademia Filarmonica of Bologna has a Te Deum «written in May 1849 for the return to Florence of Leopoldo II and from the same author donated to Masseangeli on 4 March 1850»: Masseangelo Masseangeli was the librarian of the Accademia;
- The Chiesa di San Giovannino degli Scolopi in Florence has a handwritten copy, maybe an autograph, with scene indications of the liturgical drama L'ultimo giorno di Gerusalemme of 1847 (then printed by the Calasanziana Publishers of Florence in 1848: see also List of sacred works)

=== Manuscripts ===
According to the OPAC of Italian system of public libraries (SBN: Servizio Bibliotecario Nazionale), the Répertoire international des sources musicales (RISM), the Research of Musical Manuscripts of Milan (URFM: Ufficio Ricerca Fondi Musicali di Milano) and the catalogue of the operas of Mabellini published by Claudio Paradiso the city that possesses manuscript copies of Mabellini are:

- Pistoia: the Capitolare Archive preserves
  - a contemporary manuscript copy of the orchestral interlude La congiura from the opera Il Conte di Lavagna,
  - some separate parts from the opera Rolla and of sacred compositions,
  - some reductions (for one choir and piano) of scared words of Mabellini written by his students, Gherardo Gherardeschi and Gaetano Palloni and corrected by Mabellini;
- Florence: the Conservatorio Luigi Cherubini preserves
  - many contemporary copies of sacred compositions,
  - one copy of the cantata (after printed by the Florentine publisher Guidi) Lo spirito di Dante, of 1865 (the drafts are found in Fano);
- Bologna: the Accademia filarmonica (the Philharmonic Academy) has a fantasia on the themes of Luisa Miller by Verdi for clarinet in B-flat;
- Parma: Biblioteca Palatina (Palatina Library) conserves an Elegia for oboe, contrabass (o violoncello) and piano of 1879;
- San Severino Marche (Macerata): the Biblioteca Antolisei (Antolisei Library) has a copy of the cantata for tenor on Dante from 1887 dedicated to Ugo Martini, of which the autograph is in Pistoia;
- Ostiglia (Mantova): Greggiati Music Collection has two scene from the opera Le illustri rivali by Mercadante in the version for voice and piano that the author commissioned from Mabellini, at that time his student in Novara;
- Rome: l'Accademia filarmonica romana (the Roman Philharmonic Academy) has manuscript copies of the single parts of the Lux aeterna for Rossini.

=== Printed editions ===
Mabellini had publications with the most important Italian publishers of not only his time (Ricordi, Lucca, Guidi, Lorenzi, and the Parisian Richault), so the number of printed copies of his work is massive. The Federiciana Library in Fano and the institutions in Pistoia (the Forteguerriana Library and the Capitolare Archive) possess the most extensive amount of the collection of printed editions. In addition, it is known that almost 80 examples are found in the Biblioteca Nazionale Marciana in Venezia, more than 40 are preserved at the Conservatorio in Milan, around 20 at the Accademia di Santa Cecilia in Rome, the Biblioteca Nazionale Centrale and the Conservatorio in Florence, and about ten at the Conservatorio in Genova. After which, other can be found at the conservatories in Bergamo, Milan, Rome and Naples, la Ugo e Olga Levi Collection in Venice, the Seminario Maggiore in Padova, the Biblioteca Palatina in Parma, the Accademia Filarmonica and the Museo internazionale e biblioteca della musica in Bologna, the Biblioteca di Storia Moderna e Contemporanea, the Istituto Storico Germanico, the Biblioteca di Storia dell'Arte in Rome, the Biblioteca Apostolica Vaticana, the Biblioteca «Vittorio Emanuele III» in Naples, the Library of Congress in Washington, the British Library in London. L'Archivio della Società filarmonica of Tremona (Svizzera) has two compositions for band edited by the Florentine publisher Lapini, Baldassar and Il battesimo, without a date.

=== Librettos ===
A large quantity of librettos of the opera by Mabellini are part of the Giorgio Cini Collection in Venice, at the Biblioteca Nazionale Centrale and the Marucelliana in Firenze, at the Biblioteca Comunale and at the Conservatorio in Milano, at the Biblioteca Palatina in Parma, and at the Biblioteca Ariostea in Ferrara. The Conservatorio in Naples, the Biblioteca centrale siciliana in Palermo, and the Biblioteca musicale «of the Court» in Torino possess more than five examples of Mabelliniani librettos.

=== Letters ===
Very few letters by Mabellini were published, and many remain in the private archives of the receiver. Enormous collections are in the Basevi Collection at the Conservatorio in Florence, in the Piancastelli Collection at the Biblioteca «Saffi» in Forlì, in the Puccini Collection at the Biblioteca Forteguerriana in Pistoia, at the Biblioteca Federiciana in Fano, and in the private Archive «Picozzi-Mancinelli» in Roma.

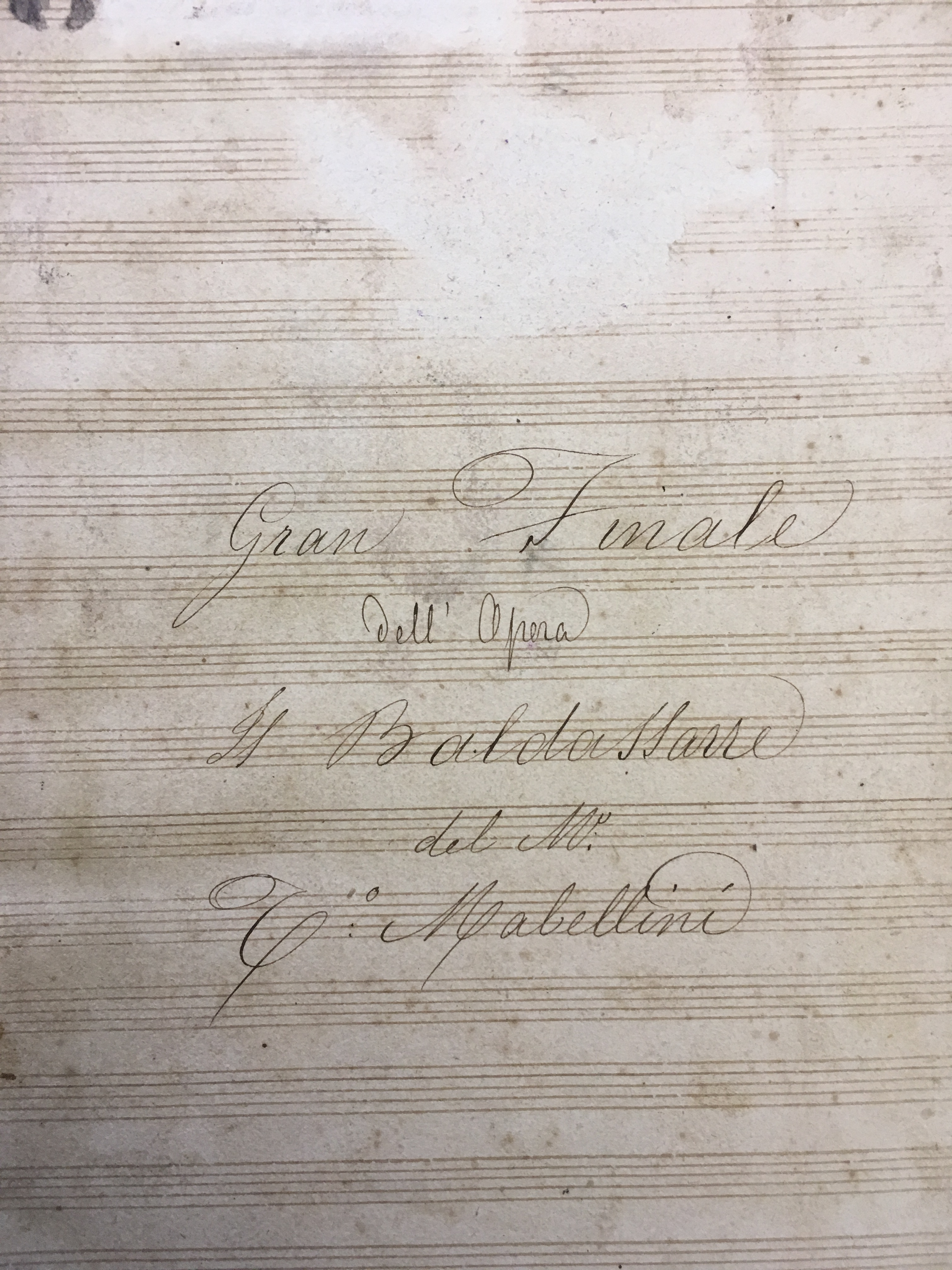
Frontispiece of the arrangement for band of the finale of the sacred drama Baldassarre present in the Biagini Collection in the Diocese Archive in Pescia.

== List of Operas ==
When not otherwise specified, the autographs of the operas are preserved in Fano.

- 1836 Matilde e Toledo staged on 27 August in Florence.
- 1840 Rolla staged in Turin on 12 November at the Teatro Carignano. Autograph in the Ricordi Publishing Archive in Milan.
- 1841 Ginevra degli Almieri staged in Turin on 13 November at Teatro Carignano. The autograph in Fano is incomplete.
- 1843 Il conte di Lavagna staged in Florence on 4 June at Teatro della Pergola. The first autograph act was donated by Eudossia Mabellini to the Forteguerriana Library in Pistoia. The other two acts are in Fano.
- 1844 I veneziani a Costantinopoli staged in Roma at Teatro Argentina. The autograph was lost. It is presumed that it could be found in the archive of the impresario Alessandro Lanari.
- 1846 Maria di Francia staged in Florence on 4 March at Teatro della Pergola.
- 1851 Il venturiero staged in Livorno, at Teatro Rossini on 15 February. Written with Luigi Gordigiani. The autograph is lost.
- 1852 Il convito di Baldassare (or Baldassarre) staged in Florence in November at Teatro della Pergola. In Fano, there is only the autograph score of the finale of the second act.
- 1857 Fiammetta staged in Firenze on 12 February at Teatro della Pergola. Written with Luigi Gordigiani. The autograph in Fano is incomplete and patchy. The complete score was printed by Lucca following a revival at Teatro delle Muse in Ancona in 1870.

== List of sacred music ==
As aforementioned, Mabellini’s sacred music has long been forgotten. In 2005, Gabriele Moroni and Claudio Paradiso took the first step in a systematic study of this music, examining the pages at the Federiciana Library in Fano. When it is other specified, the autographs of the following compositions are preserved in Fano.

=== Dated Compositions ===
- Messa Solenne in 4 voices. It is the first sacred composition of Mabellini, written under the supervision of Mercadante, who had it performed in the Cathedral of Novara in 1838;
- Messa in 4 voices. This one was performed in Novara too, in 1840, perhaps with the support of Mercadante;
- Messa Solenne in 1843;
- Eudossia e Paolo, also called I martiri, sacred drama to the text of Luigi Venturi, performed for the San Giovanni feast at the Palazzo Vecchio in Florence on 22 June 1845. It was printed by the Florentine, Lorenzi, in 1847. The autograph is in Fano, and the Conservatorio di Firenze has signaled to have an autograph copy of a reduced draft;
- Messa n. 2, 1847;
- L'ultimo giorno di Gerusalemme, sacred drama by Geremia Barsottini written for the church Chiesa di San Giovannino degli Scolopi (at that time called the Chiesa di San Giovanni Evangelista) in 1847. It was printed by Calasanziana Publishers in Florence in 1848. A manuscript copy, perhaps autograph, with indications for the scene, is still in the church in Via Martelli in Florence;
- Domine ad adjuvandum, for choir and orchestra, 1847;
- Responsori o Responsi per la Settimana Santa, for two choirs (8 voices) and a string orchestra, 1847, printed by Guidi (Florentine) around 1860;
- Kyrie [Chirie] for 3 voices, for the celebration of Santa Cecilia celebrated in the Chiesa di Novoli in 1849;
- Messa a cappella for 3 voices, 1849;
- Te Deum «written in May 1849 for the return to Florence of Leopoldo II and by the same author donated to Masseangeli on 4 March 1850». It is preserved at the Philharmonic Academy, Accademia Filarmonica, in Bologna;
- Gloria for 3 voices, composed for the celebration of Santa Cecilia celebrated in the Chiesa di Novoli in 1850;
- Messa a cappella for 3 voices, 1851;
- Messa di Requiem, is the mass that made him famous throughout Europe and one of his most well-known and most performed compositions during his life. The first performance was in Chiesa dei Santi Michele e Gaetano on 15 May 1851. The autograph is in the Capitolary Archive in Pistoia. It was printed by the parisian Richault in 1853. A modern edition of Mabellini’s Messa di Requiem has been edited recently by german musicologist Guido Johannes Joerg and released at publishing house Christoph Dohr in Cologne, Germany;
- Messa da vivo o Messa n. 3, written for the marriage of Ferdinando IV di Toscana to Anna Maria di Sassonia. The marriage was celebrated in 1856, but the autograph of the mass is dated 1852. It had already been printed by Richault in Paris in 1853 (copies are found in the Palatina Library in Parma and at the Conservatorio di Firenze);
- Elima il mago, sacred-dramatic scene to the text of Stefano Fioretti, 1853;
- Tantum ergo, for tenor, bass and orchestra, 1853;
- Libera me, Domine, for two tenors, two basses, choir and orchestra, 1856. The autograph is in Fano. It was printed by Richault in Paris in an undated edition, two of which are found in Fano and in Naples (see above, Messa di Requiem);
- Mottetto «Spes impii», 1856;
- Ecce Sacerdos magnus, for the arrival of Pope Pio IX in Florence on 18 August 1857 (a piece often erroneously attributed to Gioacchino Maglioni), preserved both in Florence and in Fano;
- Tantum ergo for alto, two tenors and orchestra, also for the arrival of Pope Pio IX to Florence, 18 August 1857;
- Unguentum in capite for mixed choir and orchestra, also for the arrival of Pope Pio IX to Florence in August 1857. The autograph is both in Florence and Fano.
- Inno degi Apostoli «Exultet orbis gaudiis», 1858;
- Laudate pueri, for tenor, choir and orchestra, 1858;
- Cum Sancto Spirito, 1859;
- Messa funebre for the fallen from the Curtatone and Montanara Battle, Battaglia di Curtatone e Montanara, performed in the Basilica di Santa Croce in Florence on 29 May 1859;
- Messa for choir and orchestra, 1862;
- Messa n. 4, 1862, incomplete (composed of a Gloria, a Laudamus, a Credo, Sanctus, Agnus Dei, and another Agnus Dei);
- Messa n. 5, 1863;
- Mottetto «Ave Maria», was performed by the tenor Pollione Ronzi in Pietrasanta in May 1867 in honor of Princess Margherita di Savoia. It was published in Milan by Lucca Publishers;
- Inno «Regina Coeli», 1868;
- Magnificat. The autograph in Fano says «Pietrasanta 24 May 1868»;
- Salmo «Sub tuum praesidium», for mixed choir and orchestra. The autograph says «Pietrasanta 24 May 1868». Perhaps, it was an element of the composition that also the previous Magnificat took part;
- In gloria Dei patris amen, canon of 4 voices, 1869: it is the Gloria that Mabellini wrote for Florimo in Naples;
- Lux aeterna. It is a piece composed by Mabellini for the Messa dedicated to Rossini planned by Verdi and remains incomplete. The autograph in Fano dates 1869.
- Agnus dei, 1872;
- Mottetto «Venite populi», «for the celebration of the Esaltazione della Croce», 1872;
- Quoniam for two choirs and orchestra, 1872;
- Qui Tollis e Qui Sedes, «performed in Lucca on 14 7bre [September] 1872»;
- Domine ad adjuvandum, for two mixed choirs, orchestra and band for the celebration of Santa Croce celebrated in Lucca in 1873;
- Magnificat anima mea Dominum, written for the celebration of Santa Cecilia celebrated in Lucca on 13 and 14 September 1873;
- Domine Jesu Christe, for soprano, choir and orchestra, 1879 («to be performed in the location of the Offertorio which exists in the printed score of the Messa da Requiem [1851] of T Mabellini in occasion of a Concert»);
- Sanctus, for mezzosoprano and orchestra («to be performed in occasion of a Concert of the Sanctus e Benedictus of the Messa da Requiem of Mabellini»). Dated «February 1880»;
- Messa dedicated to the Conservatorio di San Pietro a Majella in 1880;
- Messa solenne, 1882;
- Messa di Gloria for the Duke of San Clemente, performed in the Basilica di San Lorenzo on 10 October 1882;

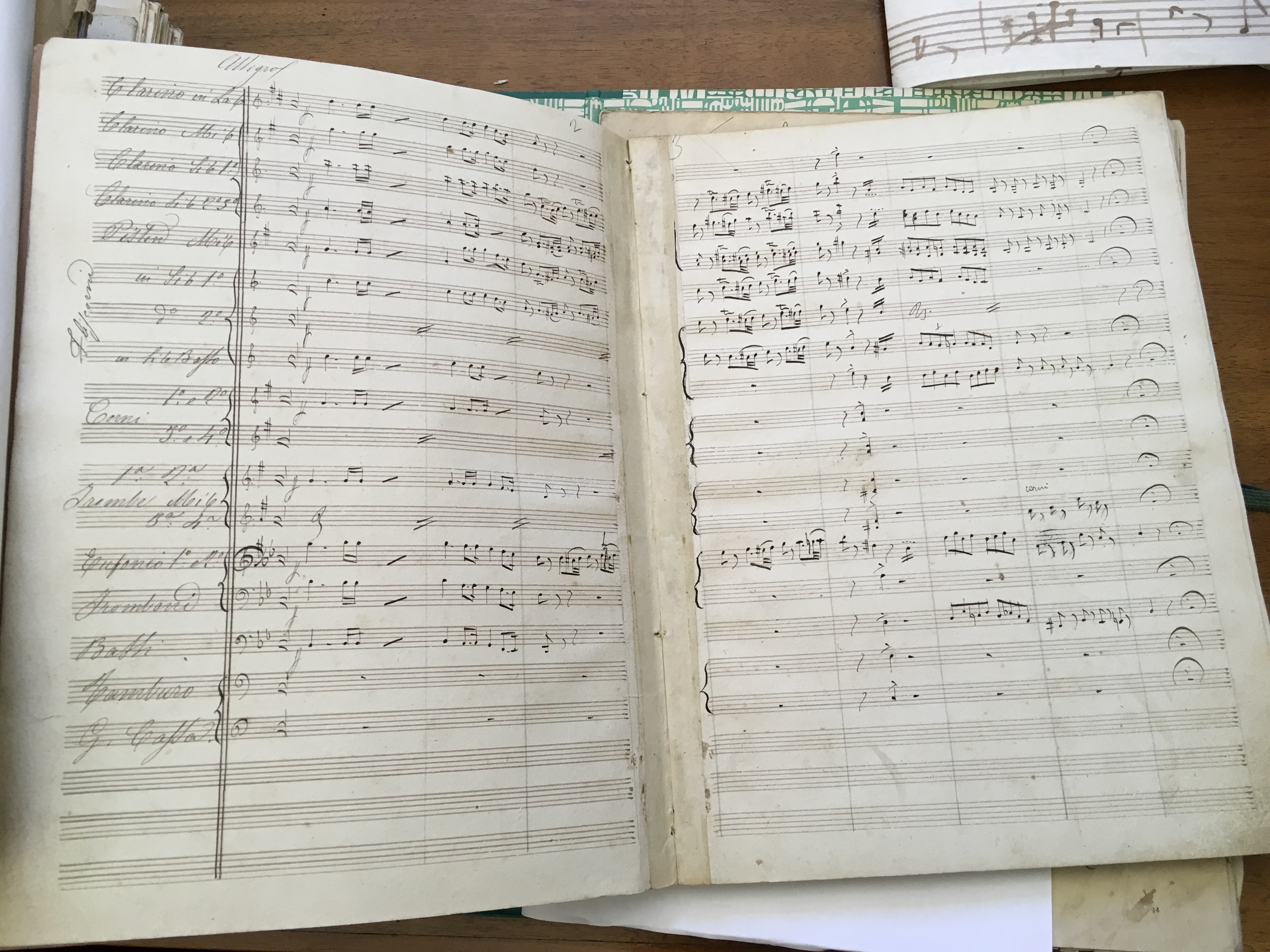
First page of the version for band of the finale of the sacred drama Baldassarre of Mabellini conserved in the Biagini Collection in the Diocese Archive in Pescia

=== Undated composition (alphabetical order) ===
- Afferentur regi, offertorio for Santa Cecilia;
- Ave Maris Stella, in Fano 4 elaborations of this composition exist;
- Miserere per la Settimana Santa, composed with a Benedictus Christus, the autographs of both are conserved at the Conservatorio di Firenze;
- Chirie [sic] for mixed choir;
- Dixit I for choir, soprano, tenor, bass and orchestra;
- Dixit II for 4 voices, choir and orchestra, for the Festa di Santa Croce celebrated in Lucca (1873?);
- Exultet for 3 voices and orchestra;
- Gaudeamus for 4 voices and orchestra;
- Graduale Absolve, for bass and orchestra;
- Graduale «Audi filia», for choir, two tenors, bass and orchestra: two versions are found in Fano, one of which is «for the Festa di S. Cecilia celebrated in Novoli»;
- Inno del Vespro di San Filippo Benizzi, incomplete;
- Inno «Iste Confessor», for tenor, bass, mixed choir and orchestra;
- Inno «Iddio la cui provvida mano», dedicated to the Grand Duke, today in Florence;
- Inno «Vexilla Regis», for tenor, bass, mixed choir and orchestra;
- Introito, in A Major;
- Introito «Loquebar de testimonies», for two tenors, bass, violoncello, couterbass and orchestra;
- Introito «Stabat juxta Crucem Iesu», incomplete;
- Iste Confessor, for 4 voices, choir and orchestra;
- Kyrie for three voices, printed by Lorenzi in Firenze (one copy is at the conservatory in Florence)
- Marcia per Gesù Morto, for band. Theautograph in Fano indicates «in Prato»;
- Messa concertata, for mezzosoprano, tenor, baritone, bass, choir and orchestra;
- Messa n. 1 for choir and orchestra;
- Messa n. 2 for choir and orchestra;
- Mottetto «Exultate gentes», for bass or soprano, mixed choir and orchestra;
- Mottetto «O gloriosa Virginum», conserved in Florence;
- Mottetto «Stabat Mater dolorosa», for bass, choir and orchestra (in Fano there is also a version for bass, trombone, counterbass and organ);
- Mottetto «Vos omnes, o Pater hominum» for baritone, choir and orchestra;
- Mottettone «Omnes gentes plaudite minibus» for the «Festa di Santa Croce»;
- O gloriosa Virginum, for 4 voices and orchestra;
- O Salutaris, for tenor, bass and organ;
- Salmo III «Laetatus sum», for mezzosoprano, tenor and orcherstra;
- Salmo IV «Nisi Dominus», for the same group;
- Salmo V «Lauda Jerusalem», for the same group;
- Sanctus, for two tenors, bass, violoncello, counterbass and organ. Incomplete;
- Tantum ergo, for bass and small orchestra;
- Te Deum, for 4 voices and orchestra, dedicated to Girolamo De Rossi. Autograph in Fano. It was printed by Lucca from Milan in and edition without a date;
- Vexilla Regis for four voices, choir and orchestra.

== Recordings ==
There have been no recordings found of any of Mabellini’s lyric operas. The parts composed for the incomplete Mass for Rossini commissioned by Verdi were recorded in 1989 by Helmuth Rilling and Stuttgart Orchestra of the Südwestrundfunk (Radio-Sinfonieorchester Stuttgart des Südwestrundfunk) for Hänssler Classic label, with the following soloists: Gabriela Beňačková, Florence Quivar, James Wagner, Aage Haugland and Alexandru Agache (the recording can be listened to on-line). In 1980, in the Auditorium della Discoteca di Stato in Rome, Walter Vagnozzi (baritone) and Loris Gavarini (pianist) recorded a series of Italian patriotic songs composed between 1847 and World War I, one of which was La buona andata by Mabellini (composed in 1848 to the text of Giuseppe Tigri, published by the Guidi Publishers of Firenze, of which the autograph can be found in Fano).
