= Emanuele Muzio =

Italian composer and conductor (1821–1890)

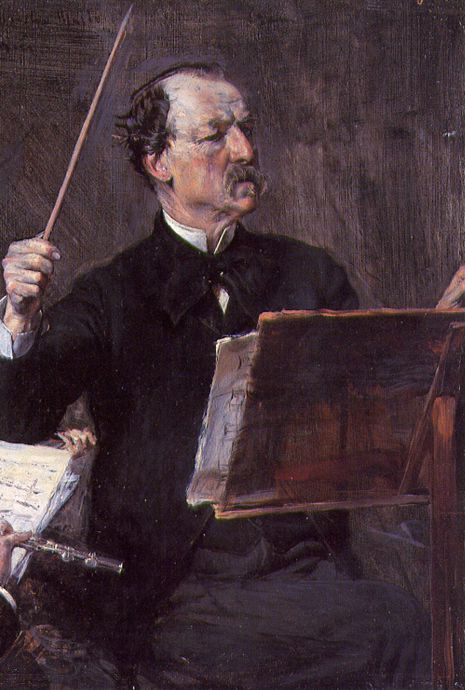
Emanuele Muzio, portrait by Giovanni Boldini

Donnino Emanuele Muzio (or Mussio) (24 August 1821 in Zibello – 27 November 1890 in Paris) was an Italian composer, conductor and vocal teacher. He was a lifelong friend and the only student of Giuseppe Verdi.

== Biography ==
In April 1844, Verdi took on Muzio, eight years his junior, as a pupil and amanuensis. He had known him since about 1828 as a protégé of his own supporter, Antonio Barezzi. Muzio, who in fact was Verdi's only pupil, became indispensable to the composer. He reported to Barezzi that Verdi "has a breadth of spirit, of generosity, a wisdom." The relationship was to grow stronger, and Muzio remained a lifelong friend. In November 1846, Muzio wrote of Verdi: "If you could see us, I seem more like a friend, rather than his pupil. We are always together at dinner, in the cafes, when we play cards...; all in all, he doesn't go anywhere without me at his side; in the house we have a big table and we both write there together, and so I always have his advice." Muzio was to remain associated with Verdi throughout his life, assisting in the preparation of scores and transcriptions, and later conducting the premieres of many of his works in their premiere performances in the US and elsewhere. He was chosen by Verdi as one of the executors of his will, but predeceased the composer in 1890.

Muzio was conductor of the Italian Opera in Brussels in 1852 as well as conducting in London and at the Academy of Music in New York City. In 1875, he settled in Paris as a vocal teacher. His students include Carlotta Patti and Clara Louise Kellogg.

== Selected works ==
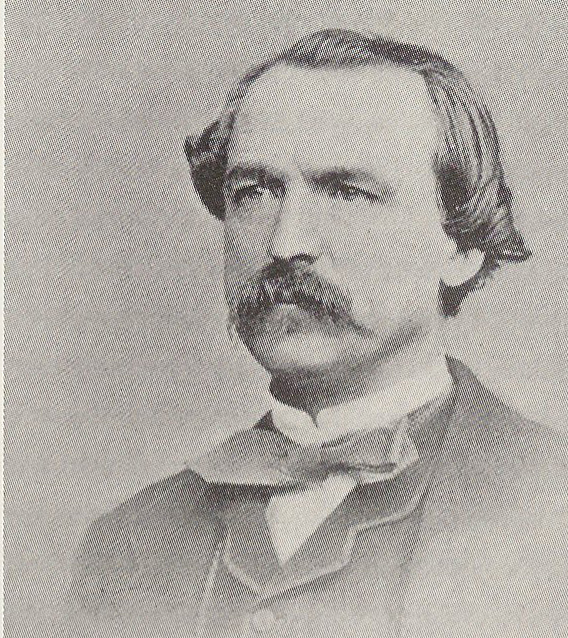
Emanuele Muzio

Operas

- Giovanna la pazza, opera in 3 acts (1851); libretto by Luigi Silva; premiere at Teatro Italiano in Brussels
- Claudia, lyric melodrama in 3 acts (1853); libretto by Giulio Carcano; premiere at Teatro Re in Milan
- Le due regine, tragic melodrama in 3 acts (1856); libretto by Giovanni Peruzzini; premiere at Teatro della Cannobiana in Milan
- La sorrentina, lyric drama in 4 acts (1857); premiere at Teatro Comunale in Bologna

Chamber music

- Mazurka di concerto for horn and piano (1849)
- Andante e Rondoletto for viola and piano (1858)

Piano

- 3 Studi sopra una cavatina dell'opera "La battaglia di Legnano" di Verdi (1849)
- Piccolomini Waltz (1858)
- Rebecca Waltzes (1860)
- The Great Uprising-Galop for piano 4-hands (1862)
- Emma Polka (1864)
- Grand March and Soldiers' Chorus, transcription from Charles Gounod's Faust (1864)

Vocal

- Sempre più t'amo for voice and piano (1863); words by A. Bertola
- La nanna, cradle song for voice and piano (1864)
- La vedova for voice and piano (1864); words by Felice Romani
- Le sorelle, valse brillante for voice and piano (1864)
- L'usignuolo (The Nightingale) for voice and piano (1864)
- Sospiro (The Sigh) for voice and piano (1864); words by Silvio Pellico
- La Madonna del pescatore, canzone napolitana for voice and piano (1866?)
- All'aura for voice and piano (1869)
- Barcarola veneziana for 2 voices and piano (1869)
- Brindisi for 2 voices and piano (1869)
- Duettino for 2 voices and piano (1869)
- L'invito alla danza, tarantella for voice and piano (1869)
- L'amore, La Polka for voice and piano (1869)
- Stornello toscano for voice and piano (1869)
