= Jacopo Foroni =

Italian opera composer and conductor

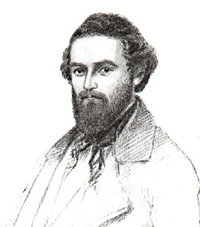
Jacopo Foroni c. 1858

Jacopo Foroni (Verona, 26 July 1825 — Stockholm, 8 September 1858) was an Italian opera composer and conductor who spent most of his working life in Sweden.

Foroni was born in Valeggio sul Mincio, near Verona, the son of the composer and conductor Domenico Foroni. After studies with his father and Alberto Mazzucato in Milan, Foroni became involved in the Five Days of Milan revolt against the Austrians in March 1848. With the failure of that movement, along with many others, he left Italy and worked as a conductor in France, Belgium and Holland with Italian touring opera companies before arriving in Sweden in 1849 to work for Vincenzo Galli's opera company at the Mindre teatern. There, he gave the Swedish premieres of works by Bellini and Donizetti as well as the young Verdi. He conducted the first music by Wagner to be heard in Sweden, the Tannhäuser overture, in 1856.

He died during a cholera epidemic in 1858.

== Works ==
- Margherita, Milan, Teatro Re, 1848
- Cristina, regina di Svezia, Stockholm, Mindre Theatre, 1849. Historical-lyrical drama in five parts and three acts. (Recorded by the Göteborg Opera Orchestra and Chorus - Tobias Ringborg. Sterling).
- I gladiatori, Milan, Teatro alla Canobbiana, 1852; libretto by Giovanni Peruzzini
- Advokaten Pathelin (sv), Swedish-language opera based on La Farce de maître Pierre Pathelin, Stockholm, Royal Swedish Opera, 1858
- Incidental music for plays (as court composer in Stockholm).
