= Ernesto Köhler =

Italian composer

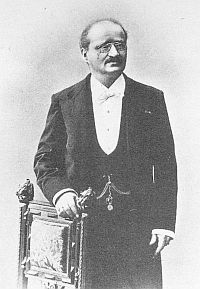
- Born: 4 December 1849; Modena, Italy
- Died: 17 March 1907 (aged 57); Saint Petersburg
- Occupations: Flautist, Composer

Ernesto Köhler (4 December 1849 – 17 March 1907) was an Italian flautist and composer. He was considered one of the best flautists of his era as well as a prolific composer and a gifted educator.

== Biography ==
Köhler was born in Modena, Italy into a musical family. He was taught the flute by his father, Venceslau Joseph Köhler, who was the first flute of the Duke of Modena's orchestra. As a young student, Köhler exhibited a natural proclivity for his chosen instrument and made rapid progress in his studies. During these early years he embarked upon numerous concert tours in Italy with his brother Ferdinando, who was a noted pianist.

At the young age of twenty, Köhler was eager to acquire a comfortable musical appointment in an orchestra while also seeing more of the world outside Italy. The fates soon smiled upon him as he acquired a position as first flautist in the orchestra of the Karl Theatre in Vienna in 1869. During the course of the following two years he continued to concertize and publish music for the flute and piano which attracted widespread attention among flautists on the European continent.

At the urging of the Italian flautist Cesare Ciardi, Köhler subsequently left Vienna for an appointment as a flautist in the orchestra of the Imperial Ballet in St. Petersberg in 1871. Following the death of Ciardi in 1877, Köhler subsequently assumed a position as a soloist in the orchestra of the Imperial Opera in Saint Petersburg and rose to become the orchestra's first flautist in 1900. In this capacity, he served for several years as the premier flautist in the Empire of the Czar.

Noted as a prolific composer for flute, Köhler wrote over 100 works for the instrument including études, duets, and flute solos. He also composed an opera (Ben Achmed) which was well received by audiences in St Petersburg in 1893. In addition, he completed several ballets including Clorinda which was also performed at the Imperial Theatre in St. Petersburg. He is well known among flute players for "Flöten-Schule" (c. 1880), his popular method for learning the flute, and for Progress in Flute Playing (his Opus 33, published in the 1880s), a series of three progressive instructional books for the flute player.

Köhler also had ties to the mandolin community; he is credited with writing an early mandolin method, Mandolinen Schule, self instructor for the mandolin, first published in 1887. His mandolin method is thought to be the first mandolin method published in Russian. His publisher was Julius Heinrich Zimmermann.

Picture of a younger Ernesto Köhler.

== Death ==
Ernesto Köhler died in Saint Petersburg on 17 March 1907.

== Reviews ==
While concertizing as a youth, Köhler was praised by critics for his brilliant execution, fine tone and the eloquence of his performances which inspired widespread approval from his audiences. The virtuoso flautist Leonardo De Lorenzo noted that his compositions embody both "genuine and spontaneous" melodic lines which reflect his "good knowledge of the technique of the flute" as well as a gift for selecting suitable accompaniment.

== Works ==
Köhler is credited with composing over one hundred works for flute. Included among his compositions is a complete theoretical and practical teaching method for the flute which was adopted by several music conservatories of his time on the European continent, numerous flute studies, duets for two flutes, works for two flutes accompanied by piano, salon pieces, virtuoso romantic etudes, a Concert Aria for Soprano, Flute and Piano (Op. 69), fantasies of German and Russian folk songs, a flute quartet and a concerto for flute and orchestra. In addition, he completed the opera Ben Achmed and scores for several ballets including Clorinda.

=== Compositions for flute ===
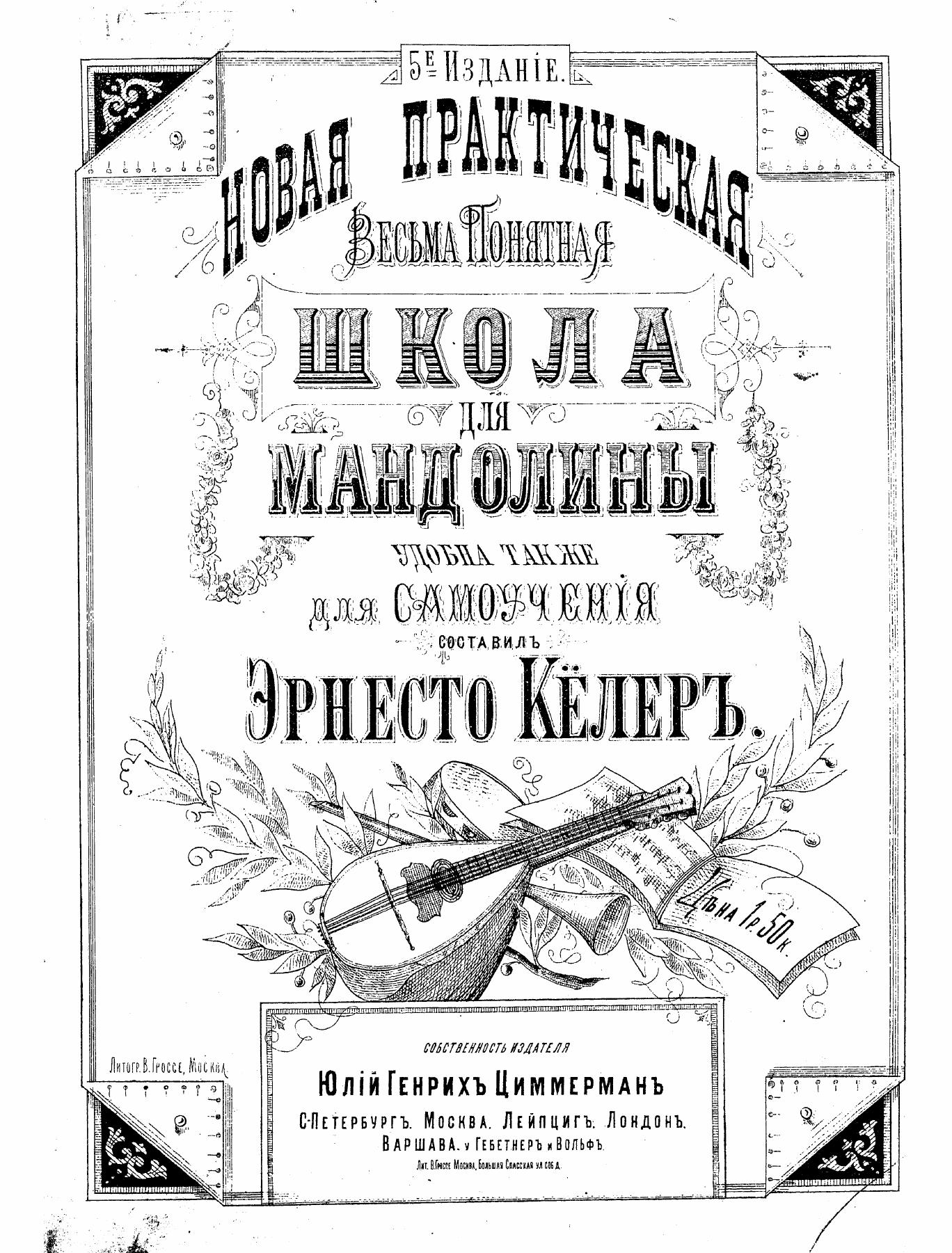
Cover of A New and Practical School for Mandolin (Новая практическая весьма понятная школа для мандолины) by Ernesto Köhler, with dual German-Russian entries. Version market to Germans was published c. 1887.

External audio
- You may hear Ernesto Köhler's The Butterfly performed by John Lemmoné in 1910 Here on DAHR
- You may hear Ernesto Köhler's La Capricieuse performed by Leonardo De Lorenzo (flute) and Salvatore de Stefano (harp) in 1915 Here on DAHR

A partial listing of Köhler's compositions for flute includes the following works:

==== Flute and orchestra ====
- Shephard Idylle, (Hirten-Idylle), Op. 58
- Concert Fantasia on a Russian Folk Song, Moskwa, Op. 62
- Concert Fantasia from the Opera Der Gouverneur von Tours (by C. Reinecke), Op. 64
- Flight of the Swallows, Concert Etude, Op. 72
- La Romantique, Concert Fantasy, Op. 80
- Zephyr Concert Waltz, Op. 81
- Fantasia, Concert Piece, Op. 91
- La Capriccieuse Concert piece, Op. 94
- Flute Concerto in G. minor, Op. 97
- II Concerto, unfinished, Op. 99

==== Flute and piano ====
- Il Tramonto Del Sole, Idyll, Op. 2
- Reminiscenze Belliniane, Fantasy, Op. 3
- Danse Savoyarde, Salon Piece, Op. 8
- Chagrin, Salon Piece, Op. 9
- Fantaisie Romantique, Fantasy, Op. 13
- Valse Caprice, Waltz, Op. 14
- Bon Soir Romance, Op. 27
- Good Evening, Romance, Op. 29
- Six Brilliant Pieces, Op. 30
- Amorenttenstandchen Op. 36
- Marsch der Aengstlichen, Op. 37
- Frühlingslied (Spring Song), Op 38
- Alla Mazurka, Op. 39
- Tarantelle Napolitaine, Concerto Piece, Op. 42
- Danse Champetre, Concerto Piece, Op. 43
- Country Dance, Op. 45
- Kuss-Gavotte, Op. 47
- Reverie Poetique, Op. 49
- Auf den Alpen (On the Alps), Op. 51
- Dance Album (Books 1-3), Op. 53
- Amoretten-Ständchen, Op. 56
- Valse Espagnole, Op. 57
- Serenade, Op. 59
- Six Salon Pieces, Op. 60
- Six Easy Fantasias on Russian Folk Songs, Op. 61
- Six Easy Fantasias on German Folk Songs, Op. 63
- Oriental Serenade, Op. 70
- Valse Mignon, Op. 71
- Concert Fantasia on a Theme by Donizetti, Op. 73
- Italian Serenade, Op. 74
- At the Sea Shore Concert piece, Op. 76
- Three Characteristic Pieces, Op. 78
- Zukunftstraum (Dream of the Future), Op. 79
- Ten Concert Etudes, Op. 82
- Six Solo Pieces (6 Vortragstucke ), Op. 84
- Carlton Mazurka, Op. 85
- La Perle du Nord, Concert Piece, Op. 86
- Four Morceaux Caracteristiques, Op. 88
- Love in Idleness, Fantasy (transcription), Op. 90
- Ruslan and Ludmilla, Opera by M. Glinka, Concert Fantasy, Op. 95
- Life of the Czar, Opera by M. Glinka, Concert Fantasy, Op. 96
- Caprice Original
- Caprice Brilliant
- Fantaisie Brillante sur des Motifs Italiens
- Fleurs d'Italie Concert Fantasy
- Mathilde, Concert Mazurka
- Nocturne
- Polka du Rossignol, Polka
- Regrets, Melodies
- Reverie Russe
- Six Sonatinas
- Souvenir de de St. Petersbourg
- Saltarello, Scherzo

==== Other training courses ====
- Echo for Flute, Cornet and Piano, Op. 40
- First Concert Duet on a Melody by Schubert, for two flutes and piano, Op. 67
- Second Concert Duet on a Melody by Chopin, for two flutes and piano, Op. 68
- Echo, Concert Aria for Soprano, flute and piano (German and Italian text), Op. 69
- The Well, for Flute, piano and soprano, Op. 83,
- Flower Waltz, for two flutes and pianoforte, Op. 87
- Au Vol d'Oiseau, Picturesque Scenes (cello ad lib.), Op. 98

==== Flute solos ====
- Marches and Gavottes (Book 4), Op. 53
- Gipsy Songs and Romances (Book 7), Op. 53
- Opera Album (Book 5), Op. 53
- Song Album (Book 6). Op. 53
- Forty Progressive Duets for two Flutes, Op. 55
- Grand Quartet for Four Flutes, Op. 92

==== Theoretical and practical works ====
- Theoretisch-Praktische Flötenschule (Theoretical and Practical Flute School) (2 vols.)
- Der Fortschritt im Flotenspiel, Op. 33
- Twenty-Five Romantic Etudes (25 Romantische Etüden im modernen Stil), Op. 66
- Thirty Virtuoso Etudes in all Major and Minor Keys, Op. 75
- School of Velocity, Daily studies, Op. 77
- 22 Exercises for Technique and Interpretation, Op. 89
- 20 Easy Melodic Progressive Lessons, Op. 93
- Twenty Four Characteristic Etudes

== Archived works ==
- The Discography of American Historical Recordings catalog at the University of California at Santa Barbara includes selected recordings of Ernesto Köhler's compositions which are accessible online via audio streaming.
- The International Music Score Library Project contains scores by Ernesto Köhler which are available for viewing online.

== Sources ==
- Köhler's Page
- Inside cover biography of Ernesto Köhler, "Progress in Flute playing (Op.33) Book 3: 8 Advanced studies", Chester Music, edited by Edward Blakeman http://www.chesternovello.com/default.aspx
- My Complete Story of the Flute. De Lorenzo, Leonardo. Texas Tech University Press, 1992 p. 161-166 ISBN 9780896722774 Biography of Ernesto Kohler
