= Giovanni Peruzzini =

Giovanni Peruzzini (June 6, 1815 – May 16, 1869) was an Italian opera librettist, poet, and translator.

== Life and career ==
Giovanni Peruzzini was born in Venice, Italy on June 6, 1815. His first poetry was published while still a teenager. He became a well known translator of German literature into Italian; notably translating many works by Ludwig Uhland and Heinrich Heine among other German writers.

Peruzzini began writing opera libretti in the early 1840s, and held the post of resident poet at La Fenice until 1848. After this he was the resident poet at La Scala until returning to Venice in 1859. His first libretto was for Giovanni Pacini's Il duca d'Alba (1842, La Fenice). He wrote the first two acts to this opera, but became seriously ill and was unable to complete it. The third and final act was written by Francesco Maria Piave. Later that year he wrote the libretto to Giovanni Battista Ferrari's opera Pietro Candiano IV. For Ferrari he also wrote the libretti to Ultimi giorni di Suli (1843).

For the composer Samuele Levi he wrote the libretto to the tragedia lirica Giuditta (1844). He wrote several opera libretti for the composer Lauro Rossi; including Il borgomastro di Schiedam (1844), Cellini a Parigi (1845), Le sabine (1852), and La sirena (1855). Other composers he wrote libretti for included Antonio Buzzolla, Jacopo Foroni, Riccardo Gandolfi, Achille Graffigna, Emanuele Muzio, Carlo Pedrotti, Errico Petrella, Francesco Pollini, Giuseppe Poniatowski, Antonio Ronzi, Gualtiero Sanelli, Francesco Tessarin, and Antonio Traversari.

French composer Guillaume Louis Cottrau also used a libretto by Peruzzini for his 1891 opera Imelda; made years after Peruzzini's death in Venice on May 16, 1869.
