= Achille Graffigna =

Italian composer and conductor

Achille Graffigna (5 May 1816, San Martino dall'Argine - 19 July 1896, Padua) was an Italian composer and conductor. He composed a total of 18 operas, two of which premiered at La Scala in Milan: La conquista di Granata (1839) and Ildegonda e Rizzardo (1841). Several of his operas premiered at the Teatro Regio di Torino as well where he was also active as a conductor. His 1858 opera, Veronica Cybo, used a libretto by Giovanni Peruzzini.
