= Camilla Guiscardi Gandolfi =

Italian painter (1806–1893)

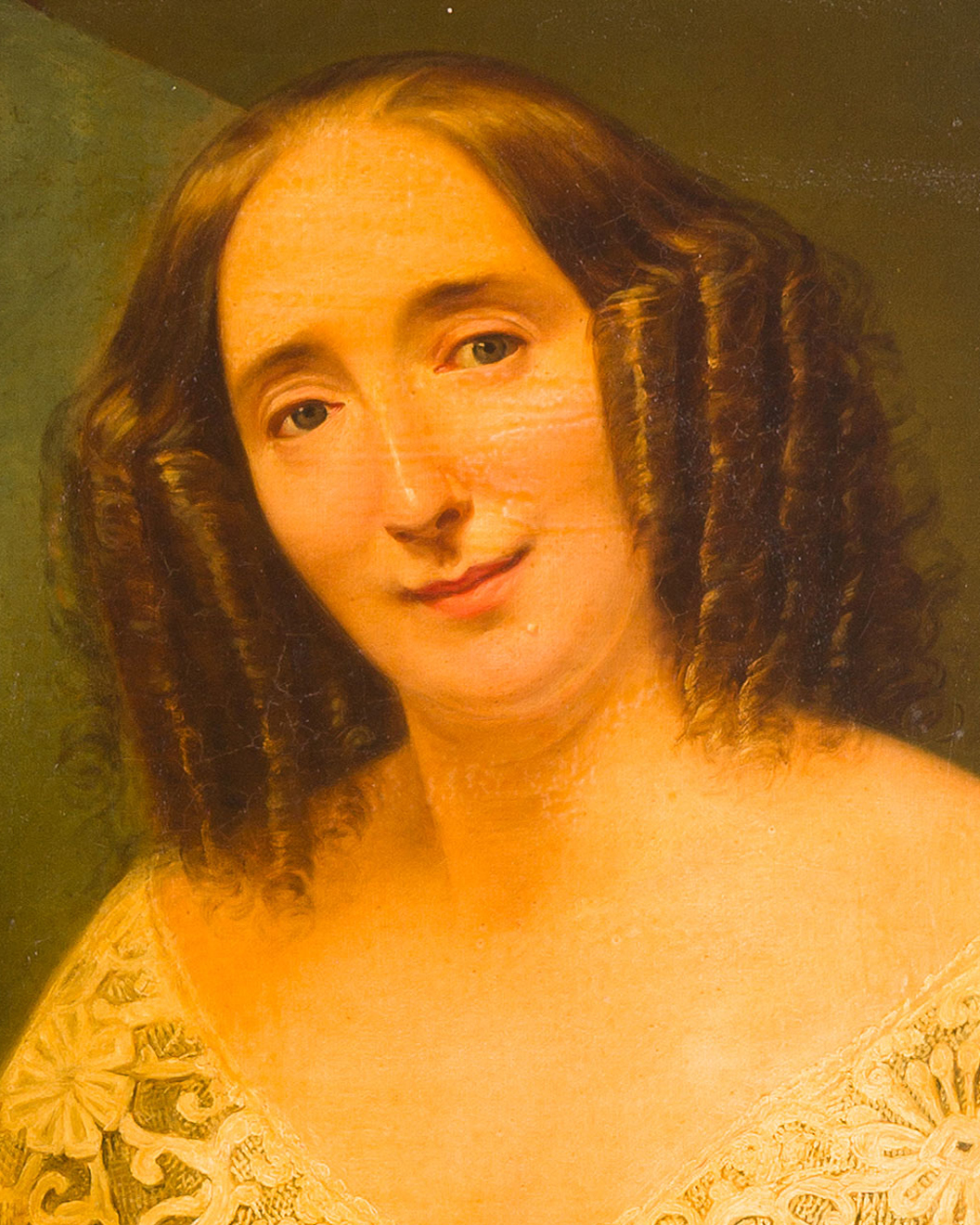
- Self-portrait of Camilla Guiscardi Gandolfi
- Born: Camilla Guasconi (Guiscardi); 1806; Genoa
- Died: 9 February 1893 (aged 86–87); Florence
- Education: Collegio Viale, Milan
- Years active: c. 1820–1875
- Known for: Painting; drawing; engraving

Camilla Guiscardi Gandolfi (1806 – 9 February 1893) was an Italian painter.

== Life and career ==
Camilla Guiscardi was born in Genoa in 1806, with the surname Guasconi, arguably the niece of Felice Guasconi, later legitimized by her biological father. She studied in Milan, first at Collegio Viale, with Ernesta Bisi, and then in Turin with Pelagio Palagi. As early as 1823, she was mentioned in the records of the Brera Academy of Fine Arts for her reproductions of works by Hayez, Correggio, Raphael (of which she redid the Madonna of Loreto with praise), Luini, Guercino, Albani, and Sassoferrato, both in oil, watercolor, and pencil. She participated in the Brera exhibitions from 1821 to 1840 with various works, including miniatures and drawings for lithographs, including those for the volume Portraits of Living Italian Women Who Distinguished Themselves in Science, Letters, and the Fine Arts, published by Vassalli in 1839.

Guiscardi married lawyer Emanuele Gandolfi from Voghera, from their union, Riccardo Gandolfi (Voghera, 16 February 1839 – Florence, 6 April 1920) was born, who was a renowned composer and music critic bridging the 19th and 20th centuries.

In addition to being a painter, she was also an esteemed lithographer and portraitist, especially of notable personalities in Milan and beyond, including Silvio Pellico, Carlotta Marchionni, Pompeo Marchesi, Giovanni Migliara, Teresa Benincampi, and others. An 1829 watercolor of Pompeo Marchesi is preserved at the Galleria d'Arte Moderna in Milan.

Guiscardi undertook study trips to Florence, where she furthered her skills under Giuseppe Bezzuoli, and Rome, and in the latter half of the 1830s, she arrived in Turin, where she settled and participated in the royal exhibitions at the Castello del Valentino (which was found to possess three of her works, at least two of which had subjects from her own family: the Portrait of lawyer Gandolfi, instigator in Voghera; The Gandolfi Family; The T. Family of Milan). In 1842, she was appointed an honorary painter to King Charles Albert of Sardinia, who commissioned her portraits for the Gallery of Daniel in the Palazzo Reale, including that of Marie Adélaïde of Savoy. She painted Genoese women offer their jewelry for the crusade against the Moors (Turin, Palazzo Reale) and Innocent IV flees from Frederick II and is received in Genoa by the Podestà (Agliè, Castello Ducale). From that year until 1853, she participated in the exhibitions of the Promotrice of Fine Arts in Turin with numerous works.

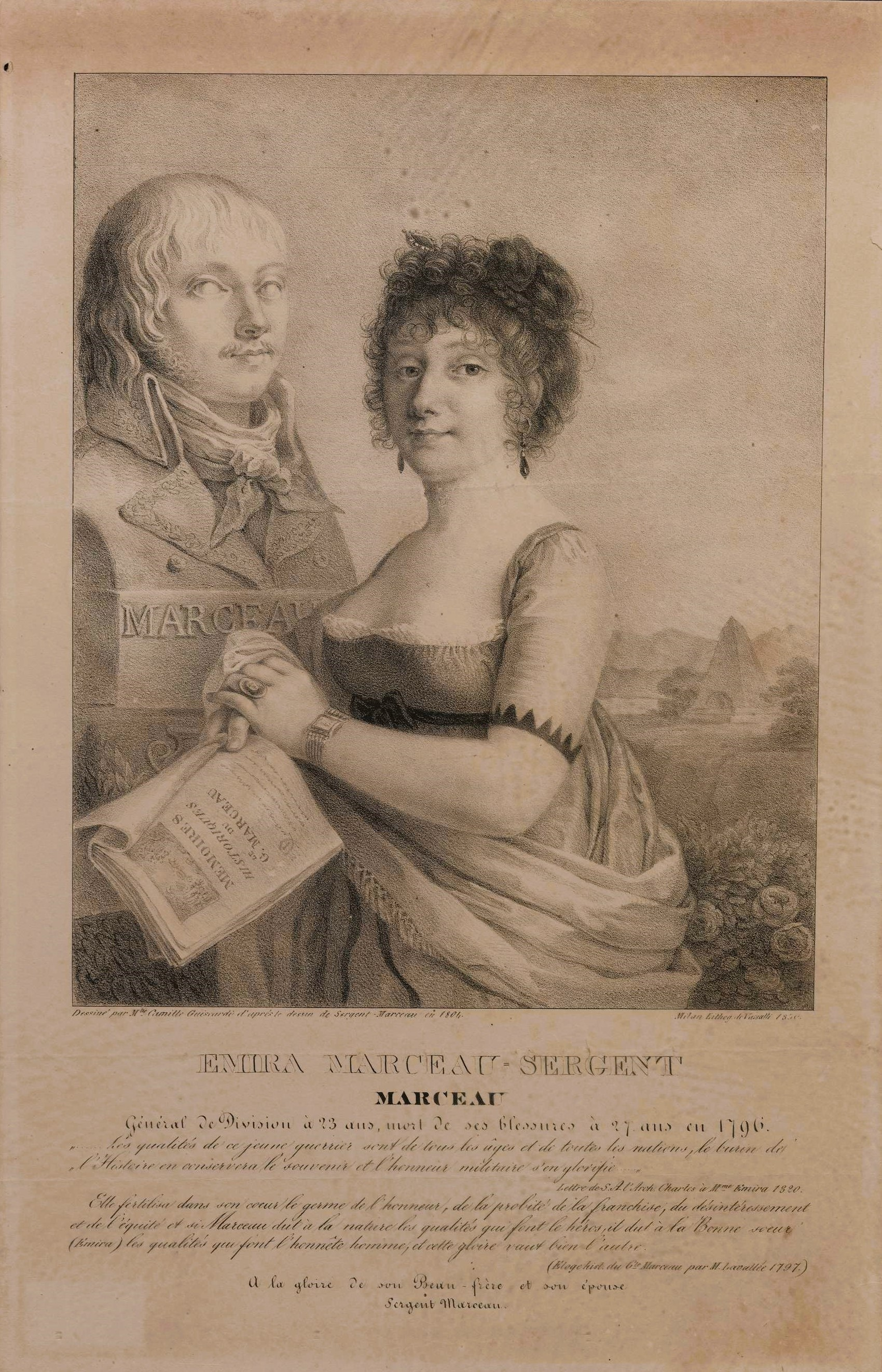
Portrait of Émira Marceau

Introduced by Francesco Podesti, on 21 April 1844 she was elected Virtuosa di Merito in the Pontifical Academy of Fine Arts and Letters of the Virtuosi al Pantheon, albeit with the incorrect name of Carolina, which she unsuccessfully requested to correct. On this occasion, she was also the subject of a portrait by Antonio Muzzi, preserved at the Pinacoteca di Bologna.

Subsequently, she returned to her hometown Genoa, where she was welcomed as an academic of merit at the Ligurian Academy of Fine Arts. From 1851 to 1854, she participated in the exhibitions of the Promotrice of Fine Arts in Genoa. In 1855, she participated in the Borbonic Exhibition in Naples. In 1846, Guiscardi and her husband were members of the Economic Society of Chiavari.

Information about her is available in Turin until 1865 when the Genoese Federico Alizeri wrote extensive biographical passages about her in his Notizie dei professori del disegno in Liguria (Information on the drawing professors in Liguria). Even in her later years, she never ceased her intellectual activity. Guiscardi died in Florence on 9 February 1893, as announced by the Rassegna nazionale three days later, publishing a biography of the painter in two pages, with the addition of some verses dedicated to her by the writer Giulio Carcano.

== Bibliography ==
- "Camilla Guiscardi Guasconi Vedova Gandolfi". La Rassegna nazionale (in Italian). Vol. 69. Tip. Cellini. 1893. pp. 784–785.
- Agostino Mario Comanducci (1962). Dizionario illustrato pittori e incisori italiani moderni (in Italian). Milan: Patuzzi Editore.
- Marcello Staglieno (1862). Memorie e documenti sulla Accademia Ligustica di Belle Arti (in Italian). Tip. del Regio Istituto sordo-muti.
- Federico Alizeri (1866). Notizie dei professori del disegno in Liguria, dalla fondazione dell'Academia (in Italian). Vol. 3. Sambolino. pp. 464–466.
- Anna Lisa Genovese (2016). "Camilla Guiscardi Gandolfi". La collezione della Pontificia Insigne Accademia di Belle Arti e Lettere dei Virtuosi al Pantheon. Dipinti e sculture (in Italian). Scripta Manent Edizioni. ISBN 9788890965753.
