= Margherita (opera) =

Margherita is an 1848 opera by the then 23-year old Italian composer Jacopo Foroni.

== Recording ==
- Alessandra Volpe, Wexford Opera Festival Timothy Myers Radio 3
