= Girolamo Alessandro Biaggi =

Italian composer

- Born: February 2, 1819; Calcio
- Died: March 21, 1897 (aged 78); Florence
- Occupations: composer, critic, teacher

Girolamo Alessandro Biaggi (February 2, 1819 – March 21, 1897) was an Italian composer, critic, and teacher of music.

== Biography ==
Biaggi was a pupil of Nicola Vaccaj and Alessandro Rolla, studying composition and violin at the Conservatorio Luigi Cherubini from 1829 to 1839.

Biaggi founded L'Italia musicale, a weekly magazine published by the publisher Lucca in 1847, which he edited until 1848. After taking part in the Five Days of Milan, he was appointed a secretary of the provisional government of Milan, after the Salasco armistice, he left Italy for Paris. After his return to Italy in 1860, he contributed to numerous newspapers and magazines including La Nazione and Nova Antologia. He wrote for the Gazette d'Italia under the pen name d'Ippolito d'Albano.

Biaggi espoused on conservative positions as a music critic, and became a professor of musical aesthetics and history of music

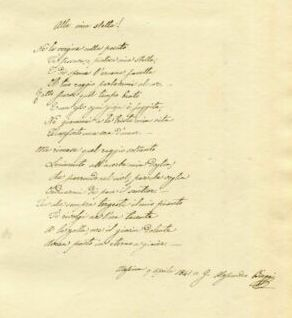
1841 poem by Girolamo Alessandro Biaggi

Biaggi composed and wrote the verses for two lyrical works, and he wrote a requiem and some chamber arias.

== Lyrical works ==
- Don Desiderio disperato per eccesso di buon cuore (1839)
- Martino della Scala (1856)

== Writings ==
- Della musica religiosa e delle questioni inerenti (1856)
- Istradamento pratico alla lettura della musica (1861)
