= Cesare Ciardi =

Italian composer (1818–1877)

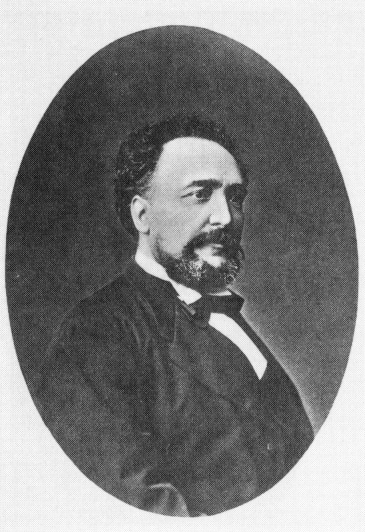
Cesare Ciardi

Cesare Ciardi (28 June 1818 – 13 June 1877) was an Italian flautist and composer.

== Life ==
Born at Prato to a Tuscan family, Ciardi eventually settled in 1853 in Russia, where he was appointed in 1862 as professor at the Saint Petersburg Conservatory and became Tchaikovsky's flute teacher. Ciardi himself played as first flute in the orchestras of the Imperial Theatres in Saint Petersburg, including the orchestra of the Imperial Italian Opera and of that of the Imperial Bolshoi Kamenny Theatre. He died at Strel'na and was succeeded in his orchestral role by Ernesto Köhler.

Ciardi possessed many talents and was also a sculptor and caricaturist.

== Work ==
=== Flute/s alone ===
Scherzo per due flauti op. 2

Trio scolastico op. 24

Ricordi d’Album op. 43

6 Capricci “I Piaceri della Solitudine”

22 duettini

Petite trio concertant s.o.

Entr'acte for the ballet The Pharaoh's Daughter, 1862

=== Flute & piano ===
Capriccio su melodie belliniane op. 12

Fantasia sui motivi della “Beatrice da Tenda” op. 21

Scherzo “Il Carnevale di Venezia” op. 22

Fantasia sui motivi di “Luisa Miller” op. 23

Simpatie pel Rigoletto op. 27

Duo concertante sui motivi de “I due Foscari” op. 29

Fantasia “L’eco dell’Arno” op. 34

Fantasia sui motivi del “Trovatore” op. 38

Fantasia sui motivi verdiani op. 40

Divertimento sui motivi del “Trovatore” op. 41

Il lamento dell’abbandonato op. 43

Fantasia “La Capricciosa” op. 44

Fantasia “Le Rossignol du Nord” op. 45

Polka “Di chi?” op. 45bis

Canto elegiaco op. 46

Fiori Rossiniani op. 47

Valse “La Romantique” op. 60

Fantasia brillante “La Folle” op. 64

Il Pifferaro op. 122

3 Solos op. 124-126

Gran Concerto op. 129

3 Notturnes op. 133-135

2 Fantasies sur des motifs de “La vie pour le Czar” op. 211-212

Fantasie, Divertimenti, original works s.o.

=== Chamber music ===
Le Rossignol op. 61 (Soprano, fl.&p.no)

Duetto Concertante op. 121 (2fl.&p.no)

Chant Elegiaque op. 132 (vl., vc., orgue & Harp)

Variazioni brillanti su motivi russi (2fl.&p.no)

Duetto nell’opera “Maria Padilla” (2fl.&p.no)

Duetto concertante su temi del “Barbiere di Siviglia” (fl., vl.&p.no)

=== Orchestral works ===
Il Carnevale di Venezia op. 22 for flute and strings

Gran Concerto Militare (fl., cl., tr. & orch.)

Le Carnaval Russe pour flute and orchestra

=== Didactic works ===
12 preludi op. 127

6 studi per flauto (Milano, 1850)

22 Etude (Moscow, 1860)

50 Point d’Orgue pour le Conservatoire de St. Petersbourg (Leipzig, 1856)

Neue Flötenschule (Moscow, 1860)
