= Abramo Basevi =

Italian musicologist and composer

Abramo Basevi (December 1818 – November 1885) was an Italian musicologist and composer.

== Early life ==
Basevi was born in Livorno. He began as a physician in Florence (1858) but then devoted himself exclusively to music. His first attempts as a composer failed but in time he composed operas (Romilda ed Ezzelino 1840; and Enrico Howard, 1847) and other music.

== Professional career ==
Basevi was editor of the musical journal L'Armonia. He founded the Beethoven Matinées (1859), which developed into the Società del Quartetto, a source of influence upon the musical life of Florence and Italy in general. Basevi offered an annual prize in this connection for the best string quartet.

In 1863, Basevi founded the Concerti Popolari di Musica Classica. He was a frequent contributor to musical periodicals, and was the author of Studio sulle Opere di G. Verdi (1859), Introduzione ad un Nuovo Sistema d'Armonia (1862), and Compendio della Storia della Musica (1866).

== Death ==
He died in Florence.

== Sources ==
- Abramo Basevi article in Jewish Encyclopedia
- Studio sulle opere di Giuseppe Verdi, di A. Basevi from the Sibley Music Library Digital Score Collection
