= Amintore Galli Theatre =

Theatre in Rimini, Italy

- Italian: Teatro Amintore Galli
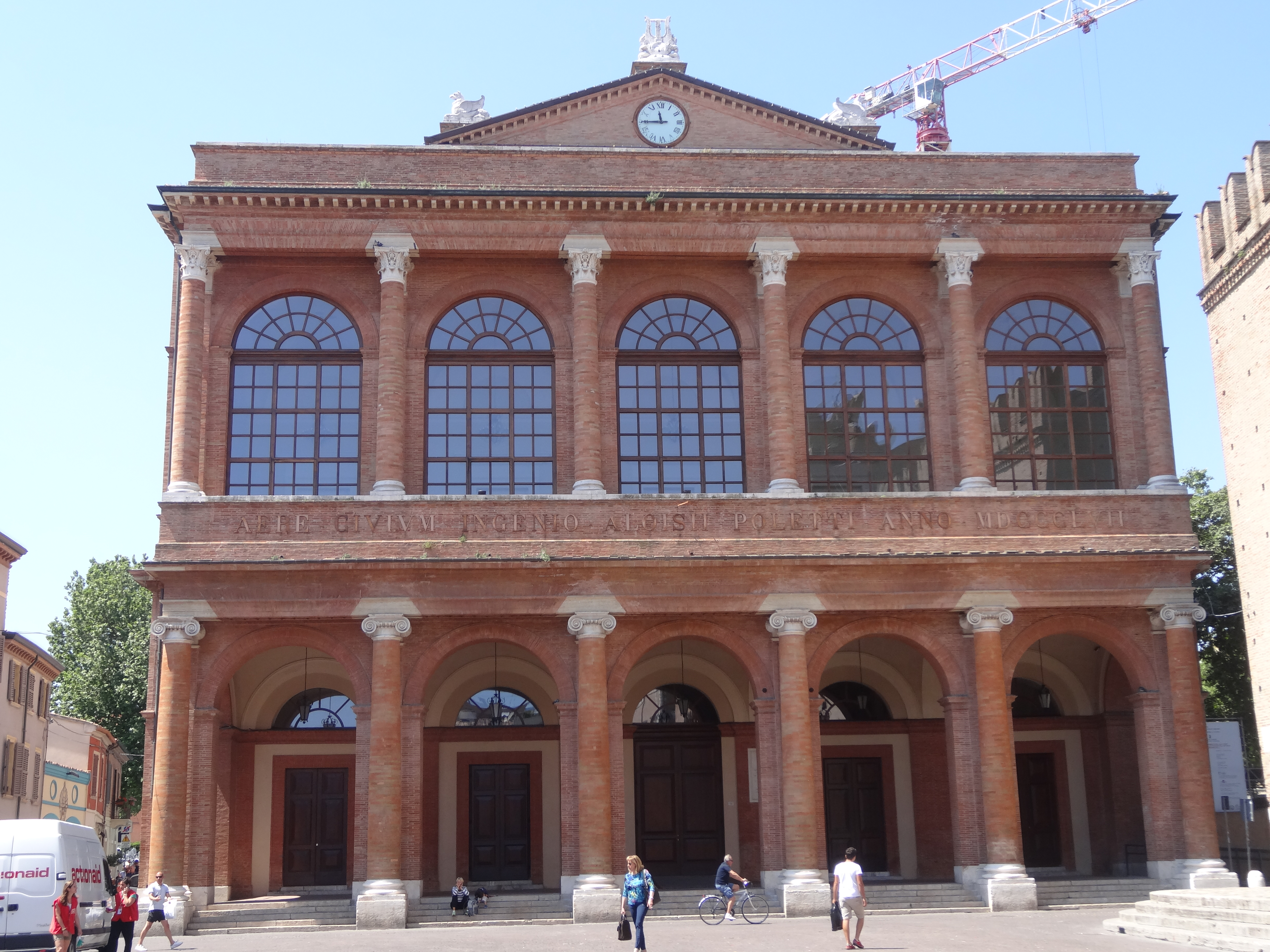
- The theatre's façade in June 2015
- Interactive map of Amintore Galli Theatre
- Former names: Teatro Nuovo Comunale; Teatro Vittorio Emanuele II
- Address: Rimini; Italy
- Coordinates: 44°3′36.6″N 12°33′53.5″E
- Owner: Comune di Rimini
- Capacity: 800
- Type: Theatre
- Event: Music

Construction
- Groundbreaking: 8 August 1843
- Built: 1843-57
- Opened: 11 July 1857
- Renovated: 1916-23, 1975, 1997-2001, 2009, 2014-18
- Architect: Luigi Poletti
- Builder: Pietro Bellini

Website
- teatrogalli.it

The Amintore Galli Theatre (Italian: Teatro Amintore Galli), formerly the New Municipal Theatre (Teatro Nuovo Comunale) and the Victor Emmanuel II Theatre (Teatro Vittorio Emanuele II), is an opera house and theatre in Rimini, in the region of Emilia-Romagna, Italy.

Inaugurated on 11 July 1857, the theatre was designed by Luigi Poletti, and is considered one of his architectural masterpieces, marking the transition from the purist neoclassical school of his training. Notably, the theatre hosted the world premiere of Giuseppe Verdi's Aroldo on 16 August 1857. It was renovated after being damaged by the 1916 Rimini earthquakes, and flourished in Fascist Italy following its reopening in 1923. During the Second World War, the theatre was severely damaged by Allied bombardment. In 1947, the semi-destroyed theatre was renamed after Amintore Galli, a Valmarecchian music journalist and composer. Following a complete restoration in the 2010s, the Galli Theatre reopened on 28 October 2018.

The theatre is managed directly by Rimini's municipal government, and hosts musical events and cultural festivals, such as the Sagra Musicale Malatestiana. The theatre's atrium is also used for weddings. The theatre can accommodate 800 spectators in its three tiers of boxes and gallery.

== History ==
=== Background ===
Since the 17th century, there had been calls to construct a public theatre in Rimini. In 1681, a permanent theatre was constructed in the Palazzo dell'Arengo, with four tiers of twenty-one wooden boxes. It was closed in 1839. Another theatre, the Teatro Arcadico, is known to have existed in Rimini in the mid-18th century. In 1816, the small Teatro Buonarroti was opened; it was closed in 1843 by order of Rimini's municipal government for its precarious structure, and replaced by a temporary wooden stage in Rimini's municipal hall.

The municipal government considered building a new theatre on Piazza del Corso (present-day Piazza Malatesta) or Piazza del Fonte (present-day Piazza Cavour), on a site used for public ovens since the end of the 16th century. While the papal aristoccracy and conservative professions supported the Corso, the nobility and bourgeoisie linked with Napoleonic Italy preferred the Fonte. The latter camp won, and the resolution relating to the construction was passed on 14 July 1840.

=== Construction ===
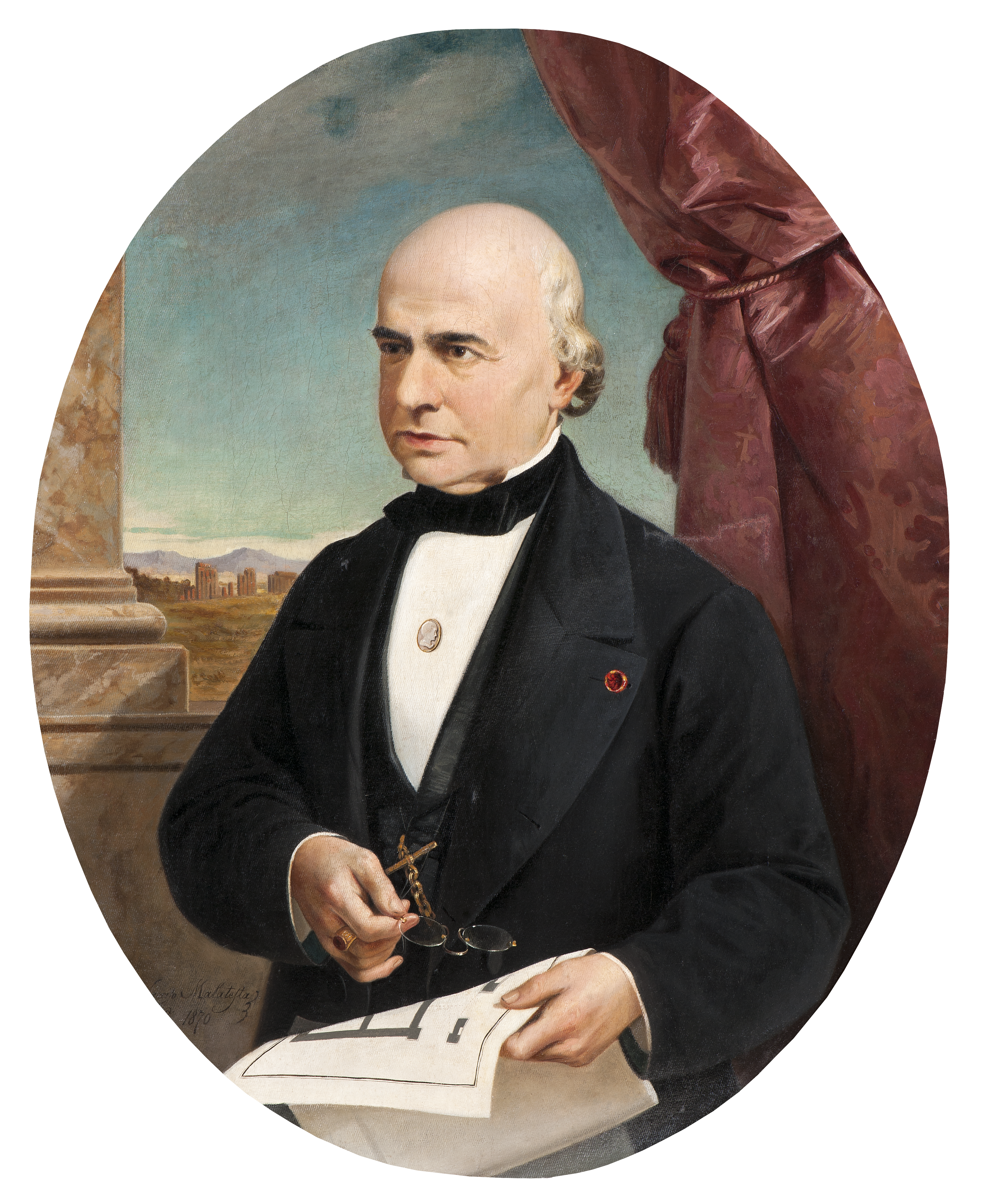
Narciso Malatesta's 1870 portrait of Luigi Poletti, the theatre's architect

On 9 December 1840 or 15 May 1841, the Modenese architect Luigi Poletti was chosen to design Rimini's New Municipal Theatre (Italian: Teatro Nuovo Comunale). At the time, Poletti was at the peak of his professional career, and considered one of the greatest architects of the Papal States. He deposited his drawings on 29 January 1842, which were passed to the contracted builder, Pietro Bellini, on 17 March 1843. The construction was financed by Rimini's municipal government and a company of shareholders, many of whom were aristocrats linked with Napoleonic Italy.

The first stone was laid on 8 August 1843. The theatre was constructed and furnished between 1843 and 1857. The project was significantly more expensive than expected, leading the municipal government to incur significant debt and pause works between 1846, when the rough building was completed, and 1854. Because many of the labourers working on the project were poor, associated work on Piazza del Corso, scheduled to start on 15 January 1847, was delayed by three days as the municipality fed the labourers bread. Over 800 labourers had come from the surrounding countryside.

Once completed, with 1,000 seats, the theatre was one of Italy's largest theatres at the time.

=== Inauguration ===
On 11 July 1857, the theatre hall was inaugurated with a performance of Giuseppe Verdi's Il Trovatore, directed by Angelo Mariani, orchestral director of Genoa's Teatro Carlo Felice. The inauguration featured the unveiling of Francesco Coghetti's stage curtain, which had been delivered just five days earlier.

A second inauguration took place with the world premiere of Verdi's Aroldo on 16 August 1857. Verdi had chosen to stage the premiere in Bologna, but was convinced by Giovanni Ricordi, his publisher and friend, to move it to Rimini. Verdi distrusted the New Municipal Theatre's impresarios, brothers Ercole and Luciano Marzi, after they had modified Simon Boccanegra's production in a theatre in Reggio Emilia without his consent. Aroldo's premiere was scheduled for 11 August, but postponed by a week as tenor Emilio Pancani was called to Florence to visit his ill wife before her death on 13 August. At Verdi's insistence, the inaugural cast included soprano Marcellina Lotti Della Santa, Pancani as tenor, and baritone Gaetano Ferri. The performance included 38 choristers, La Fenice's corps de ballet, led by Giovannina Pitteri and Virgilio Calori, at least 60 extras, and 18 band members.

The opera was an enormous success, and Verdi was called onto the stage twenty-seven times. The inaugural season consisted of twenty-two shows and some repeats, budgeted at 8,800 scudi, of which 5,000 were paid by Rimini's municipal government, and 3,800 by the box owners. It was a major event in the city, which attracted many foreign visitors, with Verdi's portrait hanging in shop windows and on walls. The Marzi brothers supplemented the season with other entertainment, including football games, horse races, and three tombola games with a prize of 500 scudi.

=== Victor Emmanuel II Theatre ===
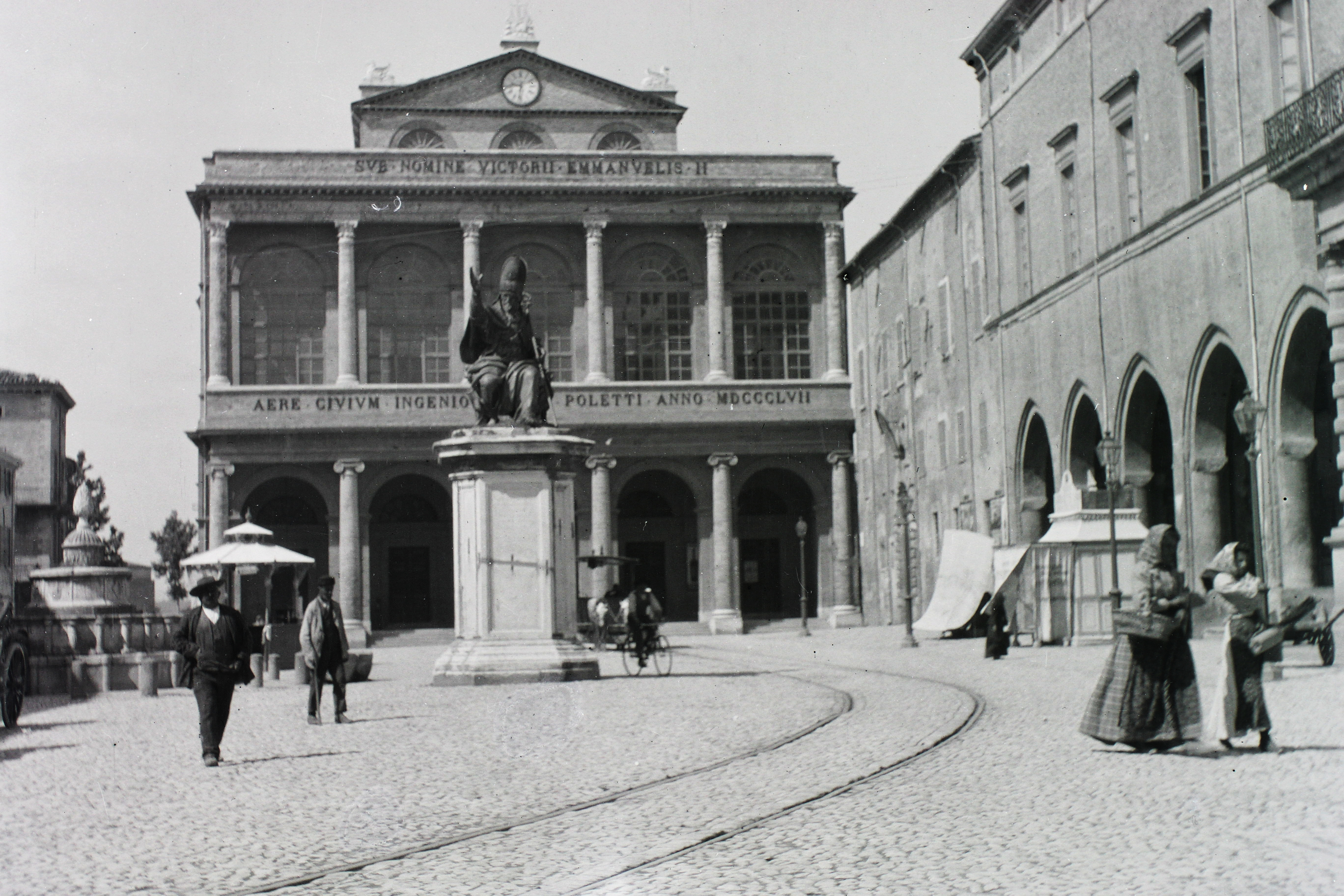
Piazza Cavour in 1910, with the Victor Emmanuel II Theatre and the tracks of the Rimini–Riccione tramway

In October 1859, following Rimini's annexation into the Kingdom of Italy, Rimini's municipal government renamed the theatre to Victor Emmanuel II Theatre (Teatro Vittorio Emanuele II), in honour of Victor Emmanuel II. It flourished with dramatic operas, such as Lohengrin, as well as verismo operas, such as Cavalleria rusticana and Pagliacci.

In 1898, a smaller theatre was built in the ballroom of the upper floor by raising two orders of galleries and placing between the levels of the stairs.

The 1916 Rimini earthquakes damaged and closed the theatre; the first earthquake on 17 May caused large cracks and several loose columns. The earthquakes also destroyed Poletti's original studies for the project, though six photographs by Luigi Perilli from circa 1900 and five watercolour drawings remain extant. As part of the subsequent restorations, the theatre was equipped with an electrical system, its chandelier was replaced, and the stage's length was reduced to accommodate an orchestra pit.

The theatre reopened in 1923 with a performance of Riccardo Zandonai's Francesca da Rimini. Between 1928 and 1931, architect Gaspare Rastelli completed the first-floor Ridotto, later renamed the Sala Ressi, and an upper-floor gallery. Rastelli did not conform to Poletti's design for these parts.

The theatre flourished in the interwar years under the direction of impresario Ciro Ragazzini. Conductor Antonio Guarnieri performed at the theatre, and visiting opera singers included Alessandro Bonci, Giuseppe Borgatti, Gina Cigna, Mafalda Favero, Carlo Galeffi, Beniamino Gigli, Giacomo Lauri-Volpi, Carmen Melis, Francesco Merli, Ezio Pinza, Rosa Raisa, Ebe Stignani, Lina Pagliughi, Aureliano Pertile, and Mario Del Monaco. Pietro Mascagni directed Il piccolo Marat at the theatre in 1926. The theatre remained in use during the Second World War; its final performance was Giacomo Puccini's Madama Butterfly on 21 March 1943.

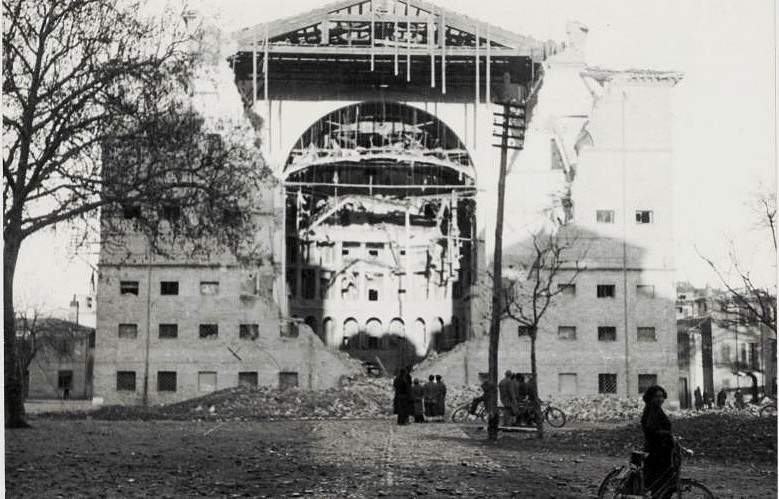
The rear of the theatre after the Allied bombardment, c. 1944

=== Wartime destruction and renaming ===
On the morning of 28 December 1943, the theatre was hit by Allied aerial bombardment. 105 B-17 and 21 B-24 bomber planes, supported by P-38 fighter planes, had been ordered to hit Rimini railway station. Its rear apse and roof collapsed, and 90% of the auditorium and stage were destroyed. The gallery's balcony was also damaged.

On 2 January 1944, the theatre was classified as "semi-destroyed" by the prefectural authorities. After the liberation of Rimini, the theatre was occupied by the military, and its furnishings and furniture were looted by the people of Rimini. The boxes and part of the side-walls were destroyed, as well as the stage tower.

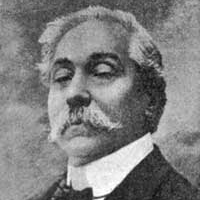
Amintore Galli (1845–1916)

On 6 May 1947, following the deposition of the Italian monarchy, a resolution of Rimini's municipal government unanimously renamed the theatre after Amintore Galli. Galli was a music journalist, composer, and musicologist, whose birth place is disputed between Perticara, now a frazione of Novafeltria, or Talamello, in the valley of the Marecchia. As artistic director of several publications for Edoardo Sonzogno's musical publishing house, the Casa Musicale Sonzogno, Galli had published many popular operatic works available at affordable prices, and was notably a judge in Sonzogno's 1888 competition that was won by Pietro Mascagni's Cavalleria rusticana. Galli is credited to have set the popular Filippo Turati's Workers' Hymn to music in 1886; it was a popular socialist anthem that was banned under Fascist Italy, making Galli's name particularly suitable to replace a former monarch. In 1904, Galli retired to Rimini, where he died in 1919. Galli's aria Cesare al Rubicone had been formed in the theatre in 1864 or 1865, and his opera Davide was staged for the theatre's fiftieth anniversary celebrations on 6 January 1907. In September 1952, Davide was revived in Rimini in Galli's honour.

=== Post-war proposals and renovations ===
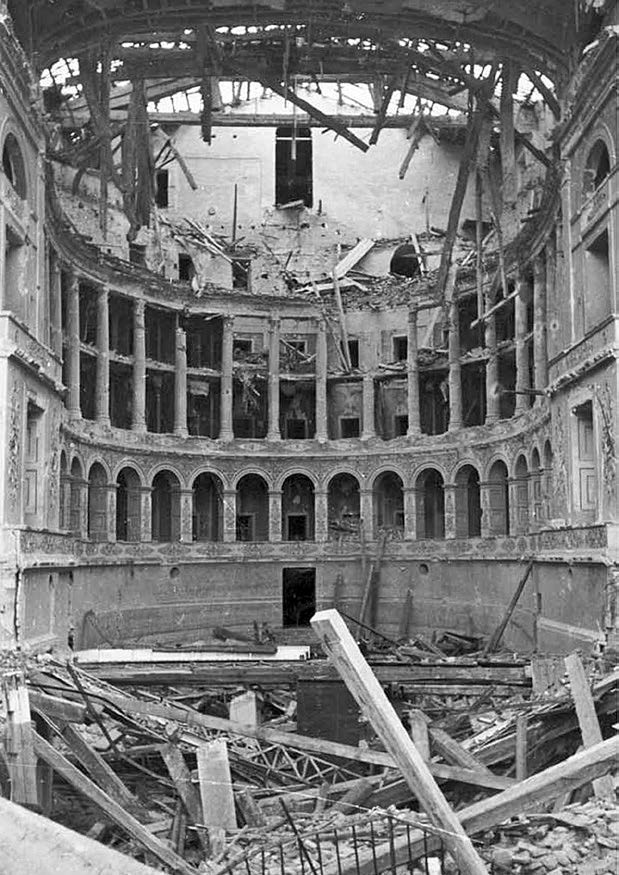
The inside of the theatre after the Allied bombardment, c. 1944

Following the Second World War, the newly-renamed theatre stood as an empty shell in one of Rimini's principal squares: though it appeared functional from the exterior, without any restoration, it was empty inside. For many residents of the city, governed by successive left-wing administrations, the historic theatre represented archaic aristocratic and bourgeois values, and therefore was to be reconstructed to a modernist design, if at all. A roof was installed above the theatre, intended to be temporary but lasting for half a decade. The area once occupied by seats was used for trade conventions until the inauguration of Rimini Fiera in 1968, after which it was used as a gym. Theatrical performances in Rimini moved to the Teatro Novelli in Marina Centro.

In 1955, the Cassa di Risparmio di Rimini announced an unsuccessful national competition to reconstruct the theatre, as a cinema-style hall with 1,200 seats. In 1959, the damaged building, covered by an asbestos roof, was used as an exhibition hall. In the early 1960s, a master plan for the city included the theatre inside a shopping centre.

In 1975, the first restoration restored the decorations and paintings of the theatre's frontal part. The renovation renewed the floors of the atrium and side-rooms, and the ceiling of the Sala Ressi, which was consolidated with iron beams. The theatre's exterior was waterproofed. Following the restoration, the atrium was used for meetings of Rimini's municipal council, as well as occasional art exhibitions and comic book conferences.

In 1984 or 1985, Rimini's municipal administration announced a competition for a new theatre, which led to the commission of a modernist replacement by architect Adolfo Natalini. Until the final plans were published in 2000, the proposal led to a petition to restore Poletti's theatre, which was signed by 10,000 residents. A campaign supporting its restoration was led by retired soprano Renata Tebaldi and endorsed by art historian Federico Zeri, conductors Claudio Abbado, Gianandrea Gavazzeni, Riccardo Muti, Carlo Maria Giulini and Riccardo Chailly, pianist Maurizio Pollini, performers Carla Fracci, Anna Caterina Antonacci, Franco Corelli, city planner Leonardo Benevolo, critic Cesare Garboli, and conservative organisation Italia Nostra. Architect Pier Luigi Cervellati, who restored Lugo's Teatro Rossini, offered his services to restore the theatre for free.

A partial restoration between 1997 and 2001 recovered the external façade and decorated surfaces in the atrium and the Sala Ressi. Some floors and the roof were also renovated. The restoration was made possible by a loan from the Ministry of Cultural Heritage, which also collaborated with the Emilia-Romagna region to construct a plan to restore the original theatre.

In 2009, technicians from Rimini's municipal government installed pillars around the stalls, added fifty seats, raised a stage tower, and excavated underneath the stalls for an archeological area with ancient Roman finds. The hall alterations were reversed by the regional superintendency, who permitted the underground rooms to remain.

=== 2010s restoration and reopening ===
In 2010, Rimini's municipal government approved the complete restoration of the theatre to a modified version of Poletti's original design. The works cost over €36 million, of which €31.7 million were provided by the municipal government, and €5.1 million by the regional government partly using funds from the European Union. Works began in October 2013, but were interrupted by the bankruptcy of the contractor company in July 2014, and resumed in November 2014 with CMB, a company from Carpi. The renovations focused on the restoration of the hall and stage, under the supervision of architect Adolfo Nicolini. During the works, the Ballet Room was built at the level of the second attic: it was planned by Poletti but never completed. The renovated atrium was returned to the city's municipal government on 28 March 2015, and opened on 17 September 2015.

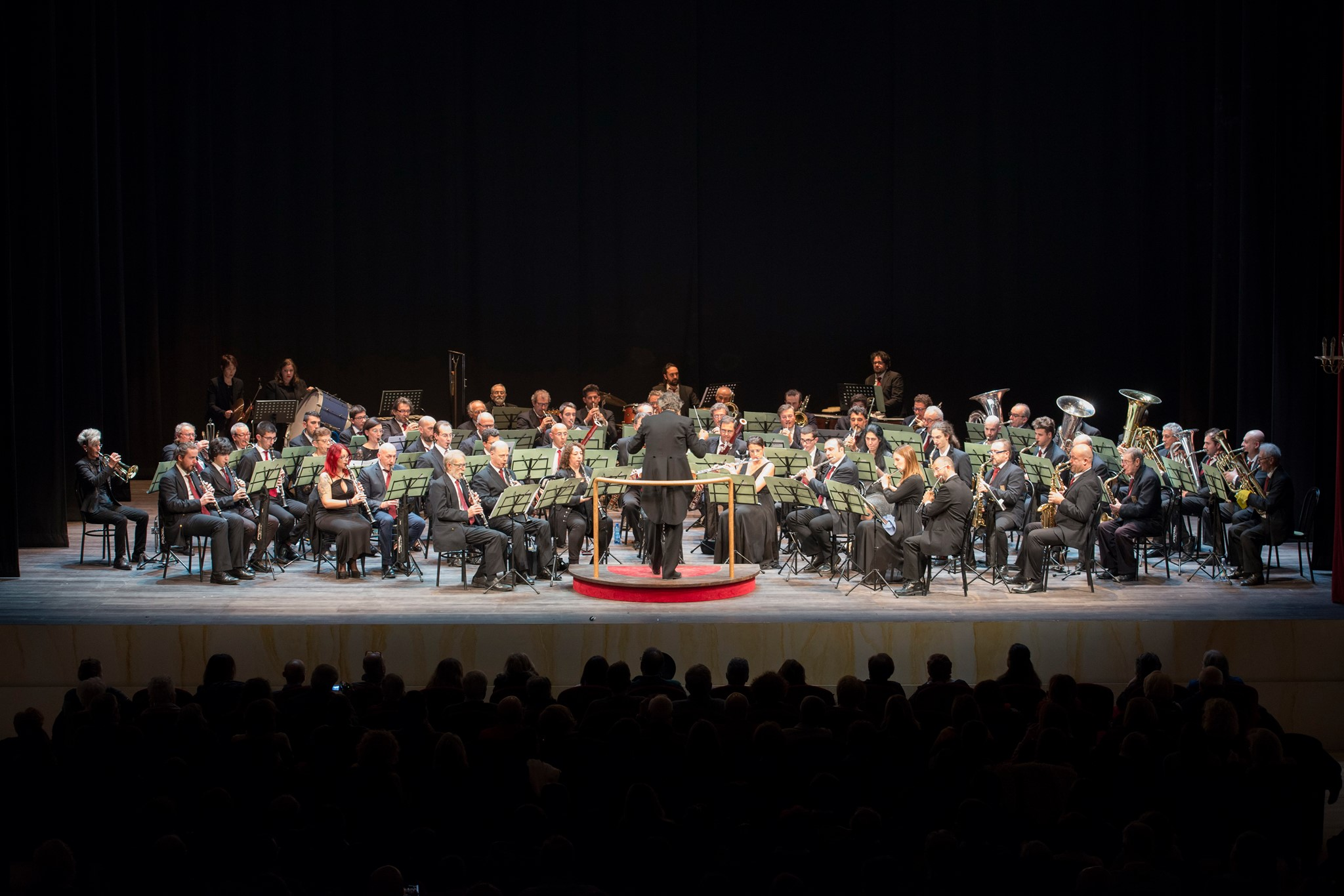
The City of Rimini Band performing at the theatre, January 2019

On 28 October 2018, the day of Poletti's birth, the first performance was held in the restored theatre, in a series of events including mezzo-soprano Cecilia Bartoli, danseur Roberto Bolle, and conductor Valery Gergiev. As part of the opening, the piano played by Verdi returned to Rimini. Leading up to the theatre's reopening, some local politicians called for its dedication to Victor Emmanuel II to be restored; others suggested it be renamed after Poletti or Verdi.

On 4 August 2019, Sergio Mattarella, President of Italy, attended a performance of Mozart's The Marriage of Figaro at the theatre. The theatre was included in The New York Times' list of 100 "World's Greatest Places".

In August 2021, Aroldo was restaged in the theatre after 164 years. Directed by Manlio Benzi, it was set in Rimini between the Italian campaign in Ethiopia and the theatre's destruction during the Second World War on 28 December 1943. Sopana Lidia Fridman played Mina, imagined as the podestà's daughter.

== Architecture ==
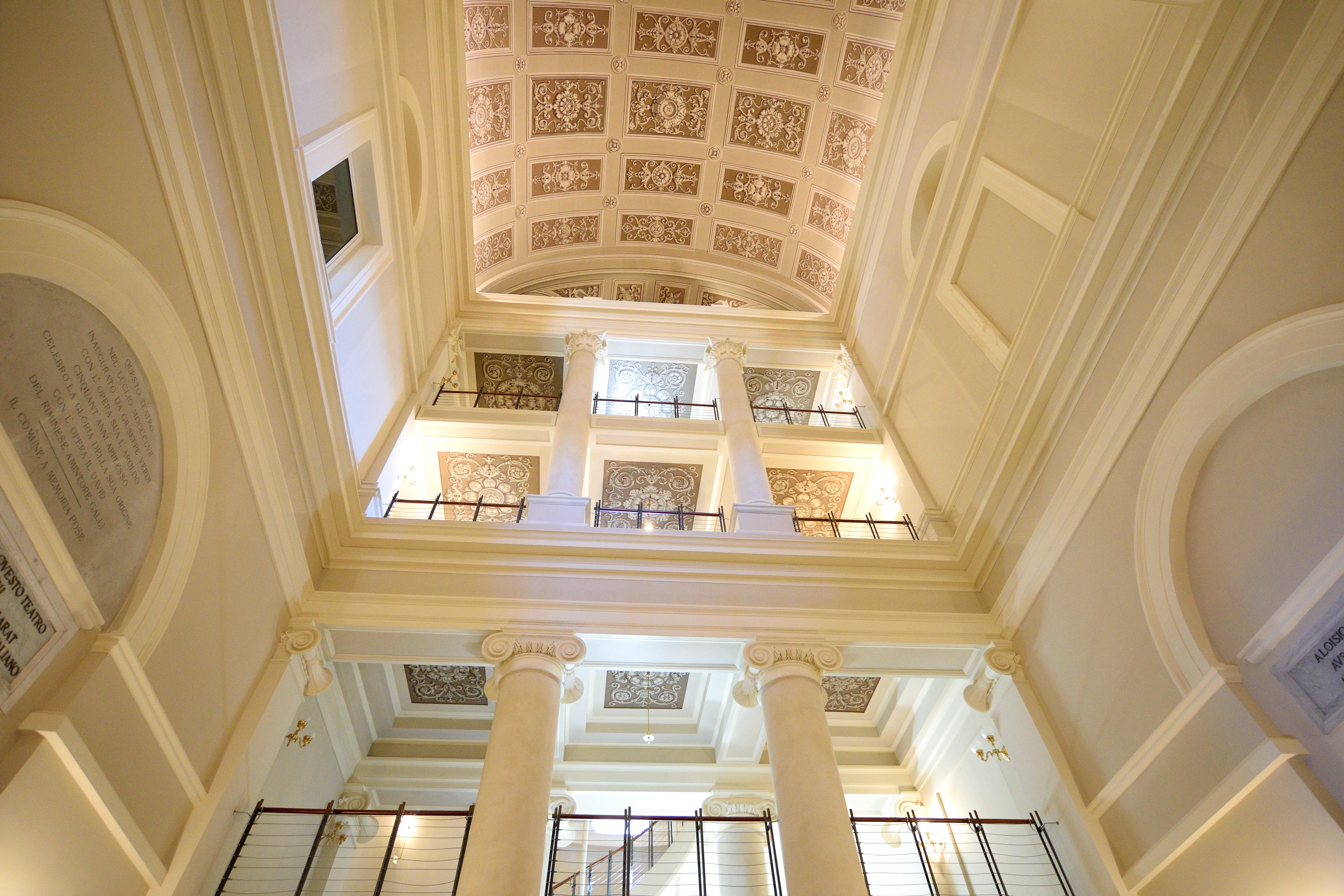
The view from the atrium, March 2016

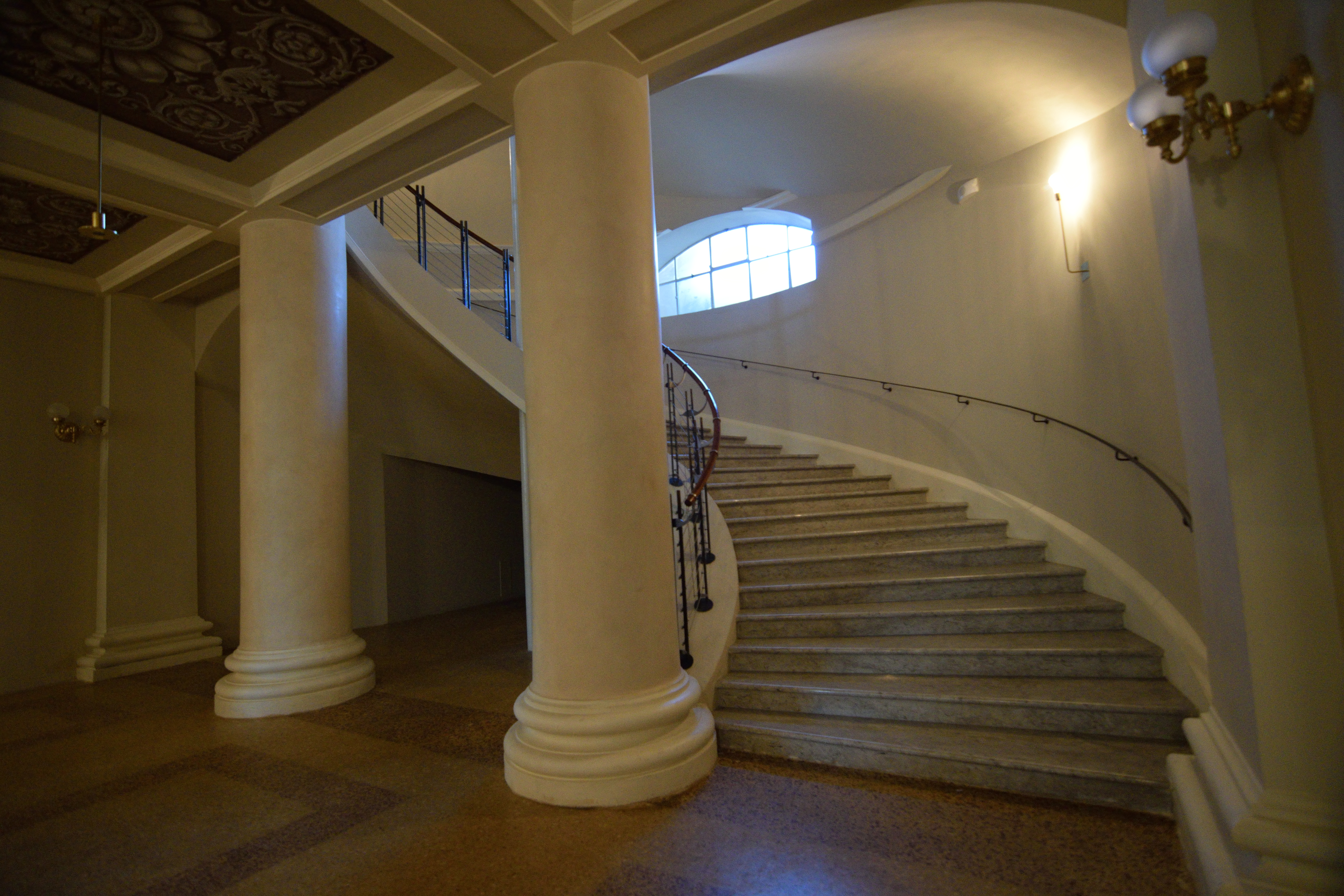
The staircase, March 2016

Luigi Poletti, the theatre's architect, envisaged the theatre as a Greco-Roman temple of music, whose monumental exterior architecture would distinguish it from contemporary European stage theatre as an opera hall in the Italian tradition. The theatre is considered one of his masterpieces, marking the transition from the purist neoclassical school of his training. Its architecture was copied in other theatres in Romagna and the Marche: Poletti adopted his Riminese design for Fano's Teatro della Fortuna.

The façade's arches and piers were designed to recall the Tempio Malatestiano, Rimini's cathedral. Poletti's name is inscribed in bronze letters on the façade: Aere Civium Ingenio Aloisii Poletti Anno MDCCCLVII (With the money of citizens, by the genius of Luigi Poletti, in the year 1857).

In its interior, the theatre is a rectangle with three parts. The first part includes a large portico, the atrium, and the stairs leading to the boxes. Departing from neoclassicist purism, the atrium was designed to be large, with expansive, circular stairs, designed by Pietro Tenerani, providing an element of Enlightenment inspiration.

The central part of the theatre was the audience seating in the music hall. There are three tiers of twenty-three boxes, in horseshoe-shaped stalls surrounded by an ambulatory. A gallery sits on top of the stalls. The first tier of boxes is double the others in height, repeating the morphological motif of the façade. The second and third tiers are framed by twenty Corinthian columns, which support the entablature and the gallery's balustrade. The proscenium includes two boxes on each side. The room progressively widens from top to bottom to preserve acoustics.

The stage is characterised by two systems of stairs, an ambulatory, dressing rooms for performers, and an apse-shaped rear wall.

As part of the 2010 restorations, the municipal government eliminated two staircases, and rebuilt much of the theatre using reinforced concrete covered with stucco or plaster. The apse was eliminated, and pillars were inserted to gain seats in the stalls. The theatre was raised by a few metres, and the dressing rooms were resited underground.

== Art ==
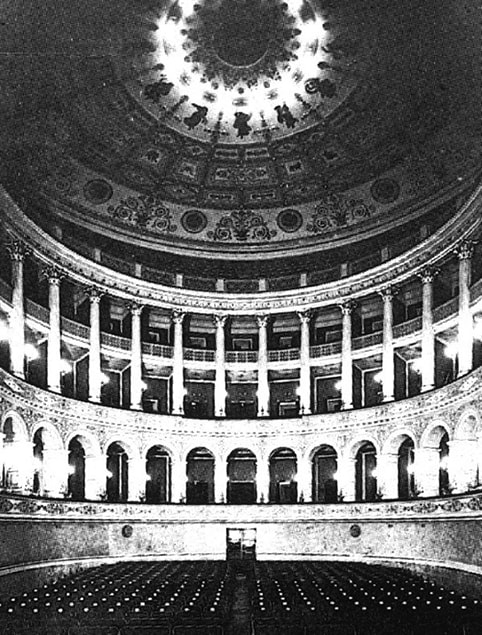
The theatre before its destruction in 1932, showing Andrea Besteghi's ceiling

The theatre hall contains scagliola and stuccos by Giuliano Corsini from Urbino, gilded by Pasquale Fiorentini from Imola. There are also sculptures by Liguorio Frioli. A stage curtain was commissioned for the 1923 reopening, depicting Paolo Malatesta and Francesca da Rimini kissing.

Andrea Besteghi, from Bologna, painted the theatre's ceiling. Divided into three concentric areas, Besteghi painted a representation of the hours, Zodiac signs, and portraits of dramatic authors. The 2010 restorations did not replicate Besteghi's painting, but gilded the ceiling with golden frames.

=== Coghetti's curtain ===
For the theatre's original 1857 inauguration, Poletti commissioned Francesco Coghetti to paint a stage curtain depicting Caesar crossing the Rubicon. Its commission was stipulated in a contract with the Municipality of Rimini dated 2 November 1855, for a fee of 600 scudi. Poletti had previously considered commissioning Coghetti to paint Flaminius wearing the consular insignia in Rimini's forum, but chose the Caesarian subject given its more popular recognition.

The curtain is a tempera on canvas, in 19 stitched strips, altogether measuring 11.3 metres (37 feet) by 14.7 metres (48 feet). Poletti commissioned the painting to follow the account of the poet Lucan, in which Caesar crosses the Rubicon by night with a warning from the goddess Roma, rather than the more popular account by historian Suetonius, in which Caesar crosses the Rubicon by day across a small bridge. This was because another theatre in Rimini already had a stage curtain inspired by Suetonius' account, painted by Marco Capizucchi. In Coghetti's painting, a defiant Caesar rides on horseback. From the sky, Roma illuminates his cavalry, whose faces are frightened, in contrast to Caesar's confidence.

The stage curtain arrived just five days before its scheduled unveiling on 11 July 1857. Coghetti had completed it by late June 1857. Poletti personally attended to its packaging and shipping to Rimini, while Vincent Paliotti, Coghetti's assistant, arrived in Rimini from Rome to unfurl the curtain and inspect any damage.

During performances, the canvas would rise vertically to reveal the stage. In the early 20th century, it was considered one of Italy's best curtain stages. Following the introduction of a horizontal velvet curtain in 1923, Coghetti's curtain was gradually withdrawn from performances. In 1938, it was restored by Enrico Pazini.

During the Second World War, the theatre's caretaker, Aldo Martinini, rescued it from the rubble of the theatre's destruction and transported it to San Marino for safety, alongside three grand pianos and five designer violins and violas. It was returned for storage to Rimini's Palazzo dell'Arengo, and unrolled in April 1995, when it was found to be in good condition. Coghetti's curtain was moved to various warehouses of Rimini's municipal government, and restored by Laura Ugolini in 2017 in collaboration with the Superintendency of Ravenna and Florence's Opificio delle Pietre Dure. In May 2021, the restoration was reported to cost 320,000 euros.

In 2014, Coghetti's studies for the curtain were recognised at an antiques market, and purchased and donated to a Riminese museum in 2016. In 2017, it was revealed that another study had been identified in a Roman auction in 2009, alongside a letter from Poletti clarifying the choice of artistic subject.

== Multimedia Archaeological Museum ==
Following the 2009 restoration, an archaeological museum was opened underneath the stalls. The museum takes advantage of excavations that uncovered a Roman domus, Byzantine finds, and the ancient Malatesta city walls underneath the theatre.

The museum explores the historical evolution of Rimini in four spaces. The first space traces the city's birth as a Roman colonia through the medieval period of the House of Malatesta to nineteenth-century Rimini. Other spaces are dedicated to the history of Italian theatre, the architecture of the Galli Theatre, and Verdi's life and music.
