= Luigi Poletti (architect) =

Italian architect

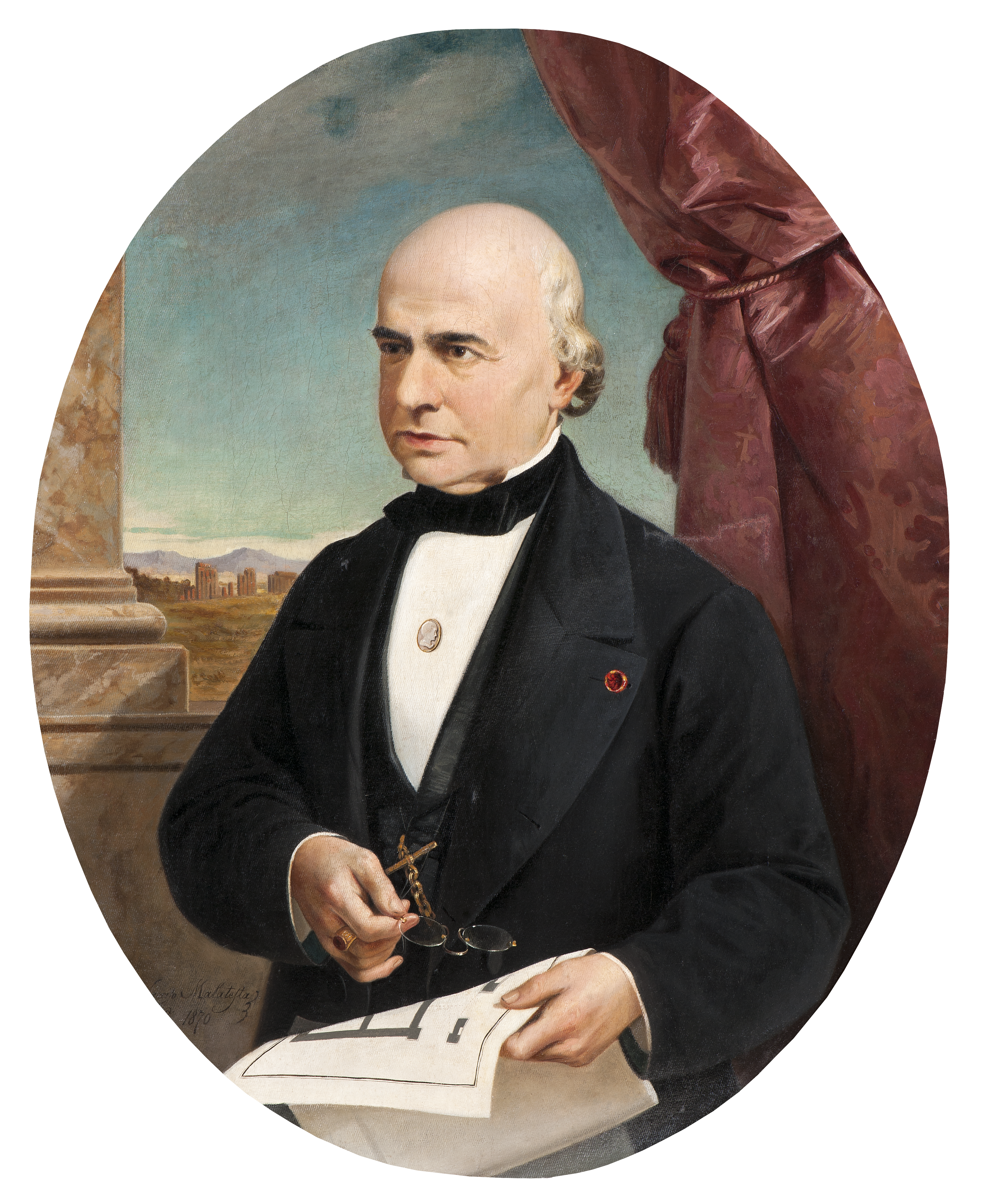
- Narciso Malatesta, Portrait of Luigi Poletti, 1870, Museo Civico di Modena
- Born: 1792; Modena
- Died: 1869 (aged 76–77); Milan
- Occupation: Architect
- Projects: Reconstruction of San Paolo fuori le Mura, Basilica of Santa Maria degli Angeli, Sant'Andrea degli Scozzesi

Luigi Poletti (28 October 1792 – 2 August 1869) was an Italian architect, active in a neoclassical style.

== Biography ==
He was born in Modena. He initially obtained a doctorate in Mathematics and Philosophy in Bologna. He returned to Modena and became an engineer of the Garfagnana and professor of Mechanics and Hydraulics at the University. He then received a stipend to study in Rome. There he studied under Raffaele Stern.

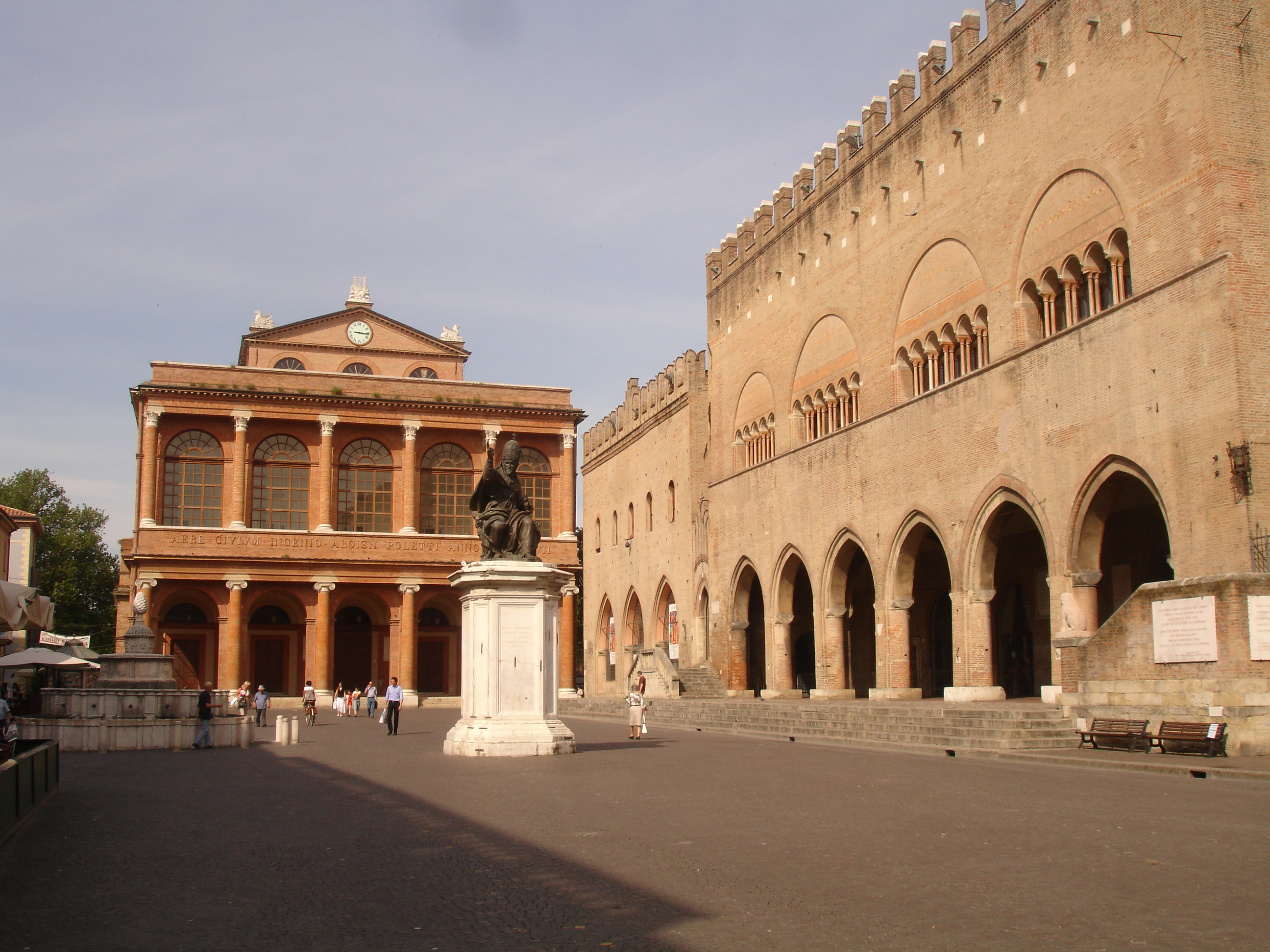
Poletti's name is inscribed in bronze lettering on the façade of the Amintore Galli Theatre he designed: Aere Civium Ingenio Aloisii Poletti Anno MDCCCLVII (With the money of citizens, by the genius of Luigi Poletti, in the year 1857).

In 1823, the ancient Basilica of San Paolo fuori le Mura, one of the seven pilgrimage churches of Rome, was destroyed by fire. When plans for a new church were announced, a great hue arose from the neoclassic adherents of the past, such as Carlo Fea, who advocated for the church to be rebuilt as an exact replica of the past. Initially Pasquale Belli was hired, but soon after was replaced by Poletti, who promised a closer replica. But he proposed to build a church as if the original builders had returned and, in their spirit, availed themselves of all the erudition compiled in the interim, revisiting the design and correcting its errors.

Poletti also added a choir to the Pantheon in 1840 and built the theaters in Fano (1845–1863), Rimini (1843–1857) and Terni (1840–1848). He rebuilt the church of San Venanzio in Camerino, which had fallen in the earthquake of 1792. After the damage from an earthquake in 1832, he rebuilt (1836–40) the Basilica of Santa Maria degli Angeli in Assisi. He built the Cathedral of Montalto delle Marche on the foundations that had been started under Pope Sixtus V. He designed the church of San Filippo in the town of Nocera (disambiguate?). He completed the chapel and altar of Santissima Maria (called dell'acqua) in San Francesco in Rimini. He built a similar chapel in Fossombrone. He designed the lighthouse and arsenal in the port of Ripa Grande. He designed the Palazzo Ceccopieri in Via di Monte Catino. He designed a number of funereal monuments in and around Rome including one dedicated to Vincenzo Casciani (1832) in the Costa Chapel, Santa Maria del Popolo and to the papal architect Cavalierie Pietro Bosio in the Campo Santo.

He also reconstructed Sant'Andrea degli Scozzesi in Rome (1869). His pupils included Virginio Vespignani. He also helped design the Column of the Immaculate Conception, Rome. He died in Milan.

== Sources ==
- www.italycyberguide.com
