= Aroldo =

1857 opera by Giuseppe Verdi

- Opera by Giuseppe Verdi (Originally Stiffelio of 1850)
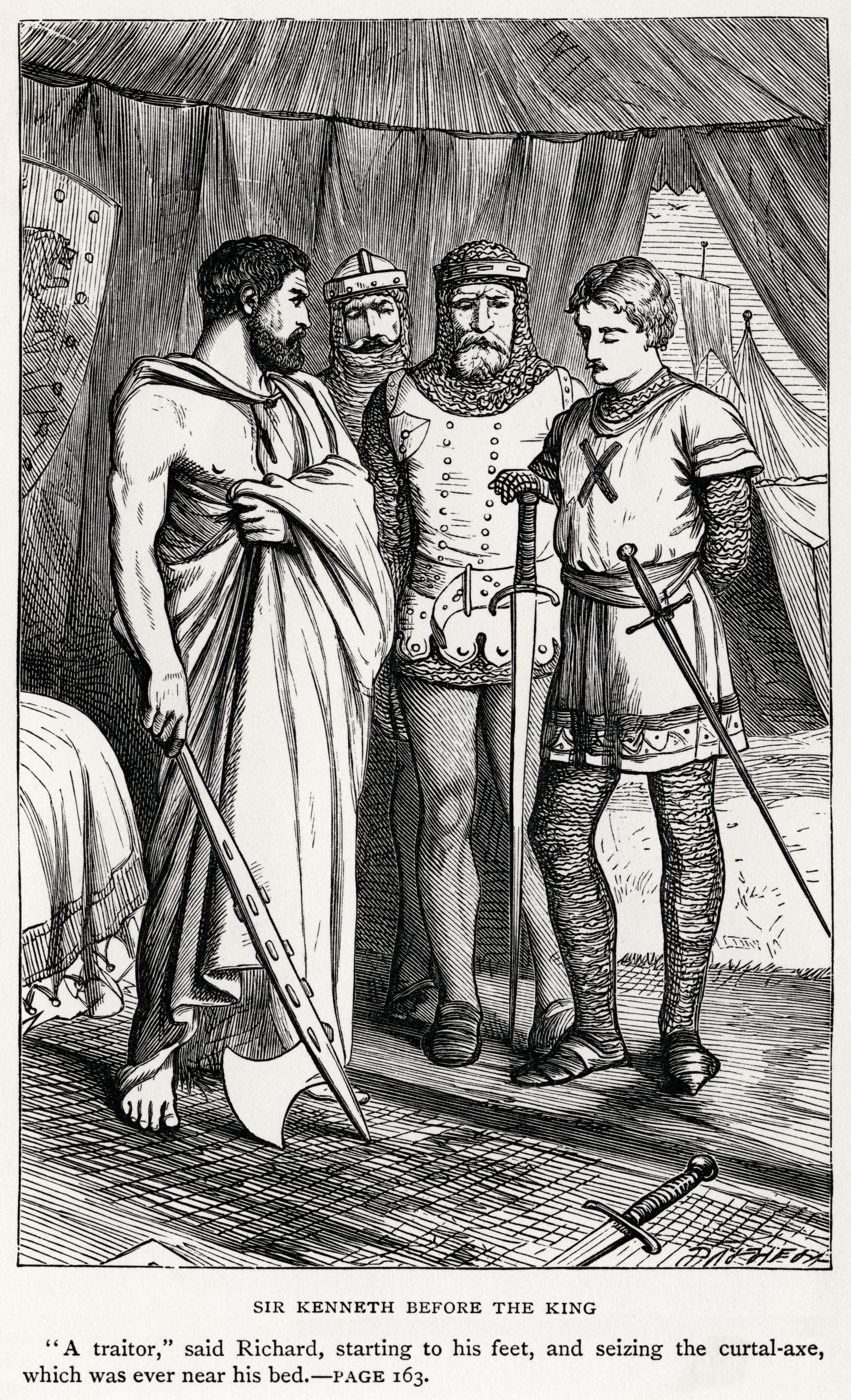
- A scene from Walter Scott's The Talisman
- Librettist: Francesco Maria Piave
- Language: Italian
- Based on: Edward Bulwer-Lytton's Harold: the Last of the Saxon Kings and Walter Scott's The Betrothed
- Premiere: 16 August 1857; Teatro Nuovo Comunale, Rimini, Italy

Aroldo (Italian pronunciation: [aˈrɔldo]) is an opera in four acts by Giuseppe Verdi to an Italian libretto by Francesco Maria Piave, based on and adapted from their earlier 1850 collaboration, Stiffelio. The opera premiered in Rimini's Teatro Nuovo Comunale on 16 August 1857.

== Composition history ==
Stiffelio had provoked the censorship board because of “the immoral and rough” storylines of a Protestant minister deceived by his wife and also because making the characters German did not please an Italian audience, although, as Budden notes, the opera "enjoyed a limited circulation (in Italy), but with the title changed to Guglielmo Wellingrode, the main protagonist now a German minister of state". Verdi had rejected an 1852 request to write a new last act for the Wellingrode version, but, by spring 1856, in collaboration with his original librettist, Francesco Maria Piave, he decided to rewrite the story line and make a small number of musical changes and additions. However, as it turned out, the work was to be more complex than that.

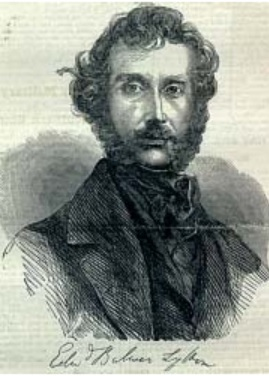
Edward Bulwer-Lytton. Harold, the Last of the Saxons (1848) was the source for Aroldo.

It drew inspiration from novels of Edward Bulwer-Lytton, specifically his Harold: the Last of the Saxon Kings, for the re-location of the opera to England and—in the last act—to Scotland in the Middle Ages, and for the names of its characters, the principal being Harold, re-cast as a recently returned Crusader. Kimbell notes that "hints" came from the work of Walter Scott, whose novel of 1825, The Betrothed, would "already have been familiar to Italian audiences through Giovanni Pacini's 1829 opera, Il Contestabile di Chester". Also, the novelist's The Lady of the Lake was the inspiration for the hermit Briano.

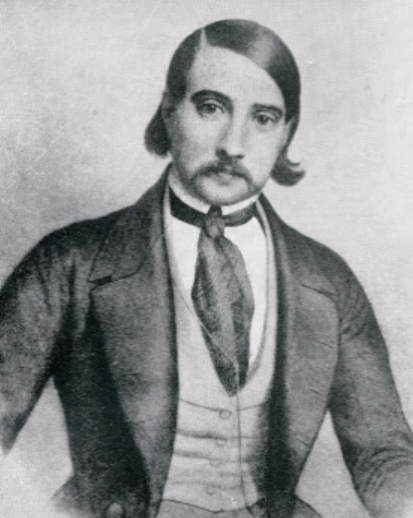
Conductor Angelo Mariani (Museo teatrale alla Scala)

The rewriting was delayed until after March 1857 by the preparation for Paris of Le trouvère, the French version of Il trovatore, and Verdi's work with Piave on Simon Boccanegra. However, as work resumed on Aroldo with Piave, the premiere was planned for August 1857 in Rimini. When Verdi and Strepponi arrived there on 23 July, they found both librettist and conductor, Angelo Mariani (with whom he had become friends over the previous years and who had been chosen to conduct the new opera) working together. While Phillips-Matz notes that there was "hysteria" at Verdi's presence, there was also opposition to Aroldo that was combined with an influx of people from other cities anxious to see the new opera. With Mariani, rehearsals began well; the conductor reported: "Verdi is very very happy and so am I".

By the time of the premiere, considerable changes had been made to the three-act Stiffelio, the prime one being an added fourth act with new material, described by conductor Mariani to Giovanni Ricordi as "a stupendous affair; you'll find in it a storm, a pastoral chorus, and an Angelus Dei treated in canon and beautifully wrought". Lina became Mina; Stiffelio, as discussed, was now Aroldo; Stankar morphed into Egberto; Jorg, the bass role, emerged as Briano.

== Performance history ==
=== Rimini premiere ===
On 11 February 1857, Luciano Marzi, co-impresario of Rimini's new Teatro Nuovo Comunale, announced that he and his brother and co-impresario, Enrico, had secured Verdi to premiere Aroldo in the theatre. Verdi had chosen to stage the premiere in Bologna, but was convinced by Giovanni Ricordi, his publisher and friend, to move it to Rimini. Verdi distrusted the Marzi brothers after they had modified Simon Boccanegra's production in a theatre in Reggio Emilia without his consent. The contract was signed in Venice's Europa Hotel on 12 March 1857. Verdi was paid 250 gold napoleons and Piave was paid 500 Austrian lire.

Verdi arrived in Rimini on 23 July 1857 to attend and direct rehearsals for Aroldo. He stayed at the Albergo della Posta, where he composed the opera's symphony. Its premiere was scheduled for 11 August, but postponed by a week as tenor Emilio Pancani was called to Florence to visit his ill wife before her death on 13 August. The opera thus premiered on 16 August 1857. At Verdi's insistence, the inaugural cast included soprano Marcellina Lotti Della Santa, Pancani as tenor, and baritone Gaetano Ferri. The Marzi brothers completed the cast with soprano Giuseppina Medori, mezzo-soprano Placida Corvetti, and bass Giovan Battista Cornago, with Angelo Mariani as conductor. The performance included 38 choristers, La Fenice's corps de ballet, led by Giovannina Pitteri and Virgilio Calori, at least 60 extras, and 18 band members.

The opera was an enormous success, and Verdi was called onto the stage twenty-seven times. The inaugural season consisted of twenty-two shows and some repeats, budgeted at 8,800 scudi, of which 5,000 were paid by Rimini's municipal government, and 3,800 by the box owners. It was a major event in the city, which attracted many visitors, with Verdi's portrait hanging in shop windows and on walls. The Marzi brothers supplemented the season with other entertainment, including football games, horse races, and three tombola games with a prize of 500 scudi.

=== 19th century ===
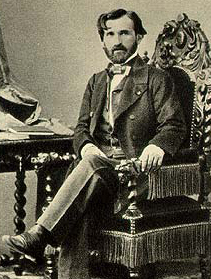
Verdi in 1859

In the seasons which followed the premiere in Rimini, Aroldo appeared in the autumn 1857 season first in Bologna, then Turin, Treviso, and Verona.

The winter carnival season of 1858 saw productions in Venice at La Fenice, Cremona, Parma (which chose it over the original Simon Boccanegra), Florence, and Rome. In 1859, it was given in Malta and then, in the following two years, Aroldo appeared on stages in Genoa, Trieste, Lisbon, and Palermo at the Teatro Massimo Bellini. In the Spring of 1864 it was seen in Turin again and then, in the years up to 1870, performances were recorded as having occurred in Pavia, Como, Modena, and, once again, in Venice. Its success varied considerably, especially in Milan in 1859, where "it was a fiasco. It was the public, not the censors, who found it unacceptable".

=== 20th century and beyond ===
Today, Aroldo is one of Verdi's very rarely performed operas, "especially since the rediscovery in 1968 of its parent work Stiffelio ". A major revival occurred at the Wexford Festival in 1959 and it was not performed in the US until 4 May 1963 at the Academy of Music in New York. In February 1964 it was given its first performance in London.

The opera was presented in a concert version by the Opera Orchestra of New York in April 1979 (with Montserrat Caballé and Juan Pons), from which was produced the first recording. But the New York Grand Opera claims to have given the first New York staged performance, in 1993. In 1985-86 Venice's La Fenice mounted the two operas back to back. Sarasota Opera presented it as part of its "Verdi Cycle" in 1990, with Phyllis Treigle as Mina.

The opera was given at the Teatro Municipale di Piacenza in 2003 and, as part of its stagings of the total Verdi oeuvre, ABAO in Bilbao, Spain presented the opera in March/April 2009.

By following its tradition to present rarely performed operas, UCOpera presented Aroldo in 2017.

In August 2021, Aroldo was restaged in its original Riminese theatre after 164 years. Directed by Manlio Benzi, it was set in Rimini between the Italian campaign in Ethiopia and the theatre's destruction during the Second World War on 28 December 1943. Sopana Lidia Fridman played Mina, imagined as the podestà's daughter.

== Roles ==
Role	Voice type	Premiere Cast, 16 August 1857 (Conductor: Angelo Mariani)
Aroldo, a Saxon Knight	tenor	Emilio Pancani
Mina, his wife	soprano	Marcella Lotti della Santa
Egberto, Mina's father	baritone	Gaetano Ferri
Godvino, an adventurer, guest of Egberto	tenor	Salvatore Poggiali
Briano, a pious hermit	bass	Giovan Battista Cornago
Enrico, Mina's cousin	tenor	Napoleone Senigaglia
Elena, Mina's cousin	mezzo-soprano	Adelaide Panizza
Crusaders, servants, the Knights and their ladies and hunters

== Synopsis ==
Time: Around 1200 A.D.
Place: Kent, England and near Loch Lomond, Scotland

Francesco Maria Piave, librettist of the opera

=== Act 1 ===
Scene 1: A hall in Egberto's castle in Kent

The people of Aroldo's castle welcome him home from the Crusades. Then Mina enters distraught and remorseful, confessing her adultery (ciel, ch'io respiri / "Heavens, let me breathe"). She prays as Briano and Aroldo enter, the latter concerned about his wife's state of mind given that she had been his inspiration during the long period that he was away fighting the Saracens. He explains that Briano, now his faithful companion, had saved his life. Taking her hand, he is surprised to see that she is not wearing his mother's ring, which she had received upon his mother's death. He demands to know where it is, and tries to get to the bottom of her state of mind but they are interrupted by the return of Briano with news of the arrival of guests. Both men leave.

Mina's father, Egberto, enters and observes her writing a letter. Already suspicious of what he believes has been going on between Godvino and Mina, he demands to know if she is writing to Godvino. Snatching away the unfinished letter, he reads the words addressed not to Godvino but to Aroldo - "I am no longer worthy of you" - and realizes that he was not mistaken. He begins to demand that Mina keep silent and ensure Aroldo's continued love (Duet: Dite che il fallo a tergere / "You mean that your heart lacks the strength to wipe away your guilt?") while she further resists. Again, demanding that she obey him, he continues to make his demands: (Duet: Ed io pure in faccia agl'uomini / "And must I smother my rage....Must I conquer my shame?"). Finally, Egberto repeats his demands that she relent: it is his will, it is her duty as a wife, she must stop crying, and no one must suspect anything. She appears to relent (Duet: Or meco venite, il pianto non vale / "Come with me now, weeping will not help you").

Scene 2: A suite of rooms in the castle

Furtively, Godvino enters the room while a party is progressing in interior rooms. He laments that Mina has not contacted him in any way and, in a pre-arranged plan, leaves a letter within the pages of a book to which he has a key. However, unseen by Godvino, Briano has entered and observes Godvino's actions. He grows suspicious: "a friend of Aroldo?", he wonders. The guests flow into the room and Godvino is absorbed within the group. They all express their joy at Aroldo's return. Briano approaches Aroldo and explains what he has seen, pointing across the room to Enrico, Mina's cousin, as the one who planted the letter and who then picked up the book. But he is amongst the group and is dressed in the same way as Godvino, so there is some confusion. Suspicion falls on Enrico as Aroldo reveals that his honour has been betrayed. He tells of a similar situation in Palestine: Aria: Vi fu in Palestina / "In Palestine there was once a certain man....", and confronts Mina, since he knows that she has a key to the book and he believes that it too contains a secret letter. Mina's attempts to stall fail, and Aroldo breaks open the locked book and a letter drops from it to the floor. Quickly stepping forward, Egberto picks it up stating that no one shall see it. Aroldo is angry and Mina defends her father. Knowing the real culprit, Egberto confronts Godvino and demands that they meet in the churchyard.

=== Act 2 ===
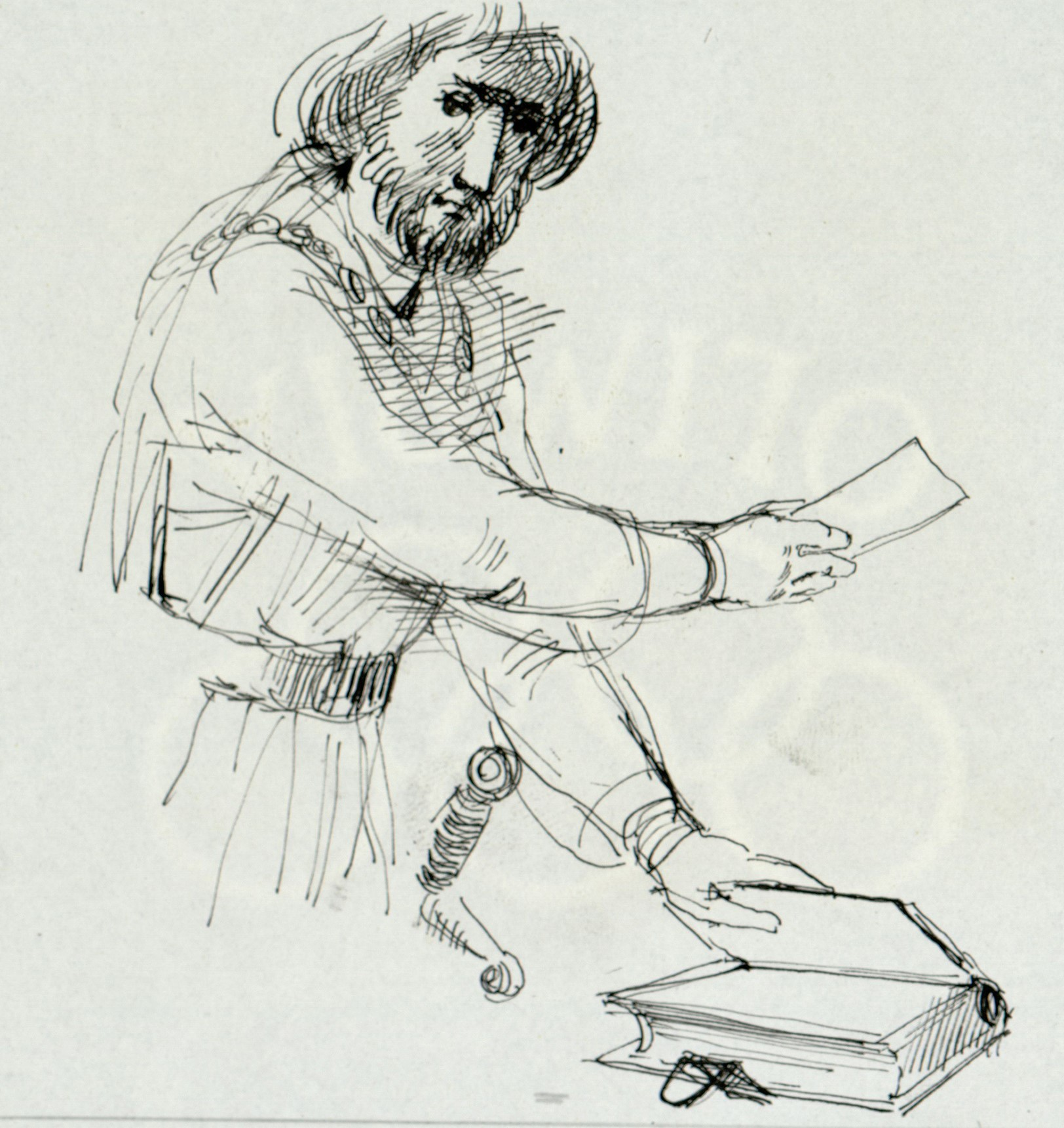
Disegno per copertina di libretto, drawing for Aroldo (undated).

The castle cemetery

Mina is alone in the churchyard; she despairs of her situation (Aria: (Oh Cielo, dove son'io? / "O Heaven. Where am I?"). When Godvino enters, she demands to be left alone and her ring be returned. He declares his love and insists upon staying to defend her while she proclaims that she hears her mother's voice coming from her tomb (Aria: Ah, dal sen di quella tomba / "Ah, from the depths of that tomb there echoes a sinister trembling"). Egberto comes across the couple, sends Mina away, and then confronts Godvino, offering him the choice of two proffered swords. Godvino refuses to take one. The older man continues to press him ("Are you dead to any sense of honour?"), accusing him of cowardice and stating that he will reveal him to be a bastard. At that remark, Godvino accepts the challenge and the two men fight until interrupted by the arrival of Aroldo. Stating that "I speak in the name of God", Aroldo tries to force the two men to stop their fighting. In disarming him, he takes Godvino's hand only to have Egberto question how Aroldo can take the hand of the very man who has betrayed him. With Mina's return, Aroldo finally realizes the truth (Aria: Ah no! è impossibile / "Ah no! It is impossible. Tell me at least that I have been mistaken"). Finally, Egberto insists that Aroldo must punish the right person and not Mina, and Aroldo attempts to return Godvino's sword and commence fighting him. Godvino refuses. With Briano's arrival and his attempts to calm his friend ("my heart has lost everything", Aroldo cries, while the chorus of praying parishioners can be heard coming from the church), all join in a plea for forgiveness. Aroldo collapses.

=== Act 3 ===
An anteroom in Egberto's castle

Egberto feels dishonoured and he regrets not being able to take his revenge, since Godvino has fled from the cemetery, taking Mina with him. He puts up his sword: O spada dell'onor / "O sword of honour...begone from me". Regretting that he has lost a daughter (Mina, pensai che un angelo / "Mina, I thought, through you, heaven had sent me an angel, a ray of pure love"), he writes a brief farewell note to Aroldo, and is about to take poison when Briano enters looking for Aroldo. He tells Egberto that Godvino has been apprehended and will be brought to the castle. Taking up his sword again, Egberto expresses his joy that one of the two of them will soon die: Oh gioia inesprimibile / "Oh inexpressible joy..." He leaves.

Aroldo enters with Godvino. The two men sit down to talk and Aroldo asks his rival what he would do if Mina were free. Mina is then summoned and Godvino is instructed to conceal himself and listen to the couple's conversation. Aroldo explains to Mina that they need to talk since he will be leaving that evening and that they must part (Opposto è il calle che in avvenire / "In the future, our lives must follow opposite paths"). He adds that she can redeem herself from dishonour by marrying the man who has captured her heart, and he presents her with a divorce paper to sign. She does so, declaring that they are free of each other. But she states that, in spite of everything, she could not be another man's wife and that she will always love Aroldo. Questioning her, he asks if she had been tricked into entering into the relationship by Godvino. When the answer is "yes", Aroldo swears that Godvino must die, indicating that her seducer is in the next room. Just then, Egberto bursts in, his sword covered in blood, and he declares that Godvino is dead. Briano leads Aroldo off to church while Mina cries out there has been no forgiveness for her sin.

=== Act 4 ===
A valley close to Loch Lomond

At sunset, a group of shepherds, huntsman and reapers have gathered on the banks of the Loch. As they leave, Aroldo and Briano appear, Aroldo confessing that he still loves Mina. The men pray as a storm begins and it drives the countryfolk back to the lake. A boat barely survives the storm and it arrives on land carrying Mina and Egberto, now shipwrecked. Seeking shelter, Egberto knocks on a stranger's door and, to his surprise, Aroldo appears, but Aroldo is angry, since he and Briano have fled to this remote place with no expectation of ever meeting Mina or her father again. In spite of Aroldo's objections, Egberto pleads with him to accept Mina as his daughter, if not as her husband. Mina tries to calm her father (Taci, mio padre, calmati / "Be silent, father, calm yourself"). In the hope of obtaining forgiveness (in a trio involving Egberto, Mina and Aroldo) she begs for a "last word" with Aroldo (Allora che gl'anni / "When the weight of years..."). Then Briano steps forward. He proclaims the often-quoted words from the Bible: "Let him who is without sin cast the first stone". Aroldo is reduced to tears and, with the pleadings of both Briano and Egberto, he forgives his wife. As all exclaim "Let the divine will triumph", the couple embraces, and Mina and Aroldo are reunited.

== Music ==
While it has been noted by modern scholars that the libretto was:

as unreal as any operetta fantasy and a far cry from the drama of Rigoletto or La traviata,[.....] the music was considerably better than the libretto and kept the opera alive for a number of years".

But at the time of the premiere, Mariani was enthusiastic, as demonstrated in his letter to Ricordi:

As for the music, this Aroldo could be one of Verdi's finest operas; it includes pieces which are absolutely certain to make an effect.

Budden notes another aspect: "the new music reaps the benefit of seven years' growing maturity...[resulting in]..the richer vein of musical invention." On the other hand, he also notes that more conventional elements in Aroldo sometimes replace the more original aspects of Stiffelio, such as the opening drinking chorus which replaces a recitative for Jorg in the original version.

== Recordings ==
Year	Cast (Aroldo, Mina, Egberto, Briano)	Conductor, Opera House and Orchestra	Label
1951	Vasco Campagnano, Maria Vitale, Rolando Panerai, Felice de Manuelli	Arturo Basile, Orchestra Sinfonica e Coro di Torino della RAI	Audio CD: Istituto Discografico Italiano; Cat: IDIS 6359/60
1975	Gianfranco Cecchele, Angeles Gulin, Licinio Montefusco, Alfredo Zanazzo	Maurizio Rinaldi, Orchestra and Chorus of RAI Milan, (Recording of a radio performance, 17 November)	Audio CD: Opera d'Oro, Cat: OPD 1440
1997	Neil Shicoff, Carol Vaness, Anthony Michaels-Moore, Roberto Scandiuzzi	Fabio Luisi, Orchestra and Chorus of the Maggio Musicale Firenze	Audio CD: Philips, Cat: 462 512-2
2003	Gustavo Porta, Adriana Damato, Franco Vassallo; Enrico Giuseppe Iori	Piergiorgio Morandi, Orchestra della Fondazione Toscanini	DVD: Bongiovanni; Cat: AB20003
