= Detti =

Detti is an Italian surname. Notable people with the surname include:

- Cesare Agostino Detti (1847–1914), Italian painter
- Gabriele Detti (born 1994), Italian competitive swimmer
