= Lidia Fridman =

Russian operatic soprano (born 1996)

- Лидия Фридман
- Born: February 20, 1996 (age 30); Samara, Russia
- Occupation: Operatic soprano

Lidia Olegovna Fridman (Russian: Лидия Олеговна Фридман; born 20 February 1996) is a Russian operatic soprano.

== Biography ==
She was born in Samara, Russia, and graduated in singing and piano in 2011 from the School of the Arts No. 17. In 2015 she completed her degree in the vocal department of the Samara Music College D.G. Shatalov. From 2015 to 2018 Fridman attended the Tomadini Conservatory of Music in Udine. She later studied at the Conservatory of Music “Benedetto Marcello” in Venice, and while there completed an internship at the Belcanto Rodolfo Celletti's Academy in Martina Franca, with Fabio Luisi as music director.

=== Singing career ===
Fridman made her theatrical debut in 2019 in the lead role in the first modern production of Albinoni's opera La Statira, at La Fenice in Venice. She subsequently performed at the Festival della Valle d'Itria in Martina Franca where she sang the title role in the opera Ecuba by Nicola Antonio Manfroce in an updated staging by Pier Luigi Pizzi. Additionally she starred in the Donizetti Festival in Bergamo as Sylvia de Linares in the world premiere of the opera L'Ange de Nisida directed by Francesco Micheli.

In 2020 Fridman assumed leading roles in the operas Dido and Aeneas in Padova and Lucrezia Borgia at Müpa Budapest, Teatro Verdi in Trieste and the Aalto Theatre in Essen. During the 2021–2022 season she sang lead roles in the operas Norma at La Monnaie in Brussels and at Teatro Regio in Turin; Aroldo at the Theatre Galli in Rimini; Don Giovanni at Deutsche Oper Berlin; Il segreto di Susanna at the Konzerthaus in Berlin; and Eugene Onegin at Staatsoper Hannover.

In 2022 she was invited by Pier Luigi Pizzi to make her debut as Giuseppe Verdi's Lady Macbeth on a tour in Italy. The following year she sang the main roles in the first staging of the opera Dalinda by Gaetano Donizetti, at the Konzerthaus Berlin, and in Richard Strauss's Salome at the Immling Festival. In 2024 she sang the role of Amelia in the opera Un ballo in maschera at the Teatro Regio di Torino under the direction of Riccardo Muti. In 2025 she sang Donizetti's Anna Bolena in Venice.

Fridman's repertoire extends to modern music by composers writing specifically for her voice: L’ombra della luce by Marco Sinopoli (Biennale Festival in Venice 2019), the opera Cassandra by Marco Podda (Theater Coccia of Novara, 2020) and Epigrammi by Domenico Turi (Verdi Theater in Martina Franca, 2022).

== Repertoire ==
- Macbeth (Lady Macbeth)
- Un ballo in maschera (Amelia)
- I Lombardi alla prima crociata (Giselda)
- Nabucco (Abigaill)
- Aroldo (Mina)
- Salome (Salome)
- Norma (Norma)
- L'Ange de Nisida (Sylvia de Linares)
- Lucrezia Borgia (Lucrezia Borgia)
- Dalinda (Dalinda)
- Don Giovanni (Donna Elvira)
- Le nozze di Figaro (Contessa Rosina Almaviva)
- Eugene Onegin (Tatyana Larina)
- Ecuba (Ecuba)
- Dido and Aeneas (Dido)
- La Statira (Statira)
- Il segreto di Susanna (Contessa Susanna)
- Cassandra (Cassandra)
- Prima la musica e poi le parole (Donna Eleanora)
- Suor Angelica (Abbatis)

== Discography ==
=== Albums ===
- Donizetti: L’ange de Nisida (Excerpts) (Live) (2020)
- Donizetti: Dalinda (Live) (2023)

== Recognition ==
=== Reviews ===
Many plays by Fridman received high marks from opera critics in Europe, the UK and the US, who noted that her voice has a rare dark (metal) timbre, and her performances are distinguished by filigree phrase and emotional acting.

=== Awards ===
- 2020–2021 — Nomination for International Opera Awards
- 2019 – Got on the list of Top 10 Young Opera Singers according to the American magazine OperaWire
