= Savona Cathedral =

Cathedral in Savona, Liguria, Italy

- Duomo di Savona, Cattedrale dell'Assunta
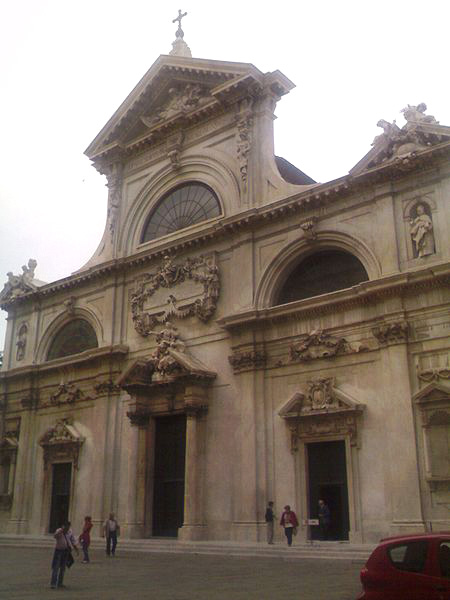
- West front of the cathedral
- Savona Cathedral
- 44°18′27″N 8°28′56″E
- Location: Savona, Liguria
- Country: Italy
- Denomination: Roman Catholic

History
- Status: Cathedral, minor basilica
- Dedication: Assumption of the Virgin Mary

Architecture
- Functional status: Active
- Style: Baroque
- Completed: 1589

Administration
- Diocese: Diocese of Savona-Noli

Clergy
- Bishop: Bishop of Savona-Noli

Savona Cathedral (Italian: Duomo di Savona, Cattedrale dell'Assunta) is a Roman Catholic cathedral in Savona, Liguria, Italy, dedicated to the Assumption of the Virgin Mary. Formerly the episcopal seat of the Diocese of Savona, since 1986 it has been the seat of the Bishops of Savona-Noli.

It was built after Genoese demolition of the old cathedral. It kept the relics of Saint Valentine. It was built in 1589 and restored in the nineteenth century.

It contains frescoes by Francesco Coghetti, - Julius II lays the first stone of the St. Peter's Basilica and Sixtus IV blesses armies fighting Turks In the presbytery there is a fresco of Christ clears moneylenders from the temple.
