= Cesare Agostino Detti =

Italian painter

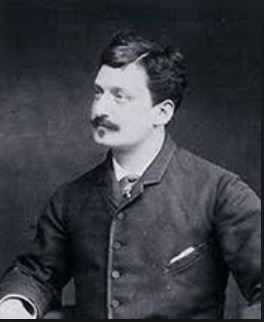
Cesare Detti (date unknown)

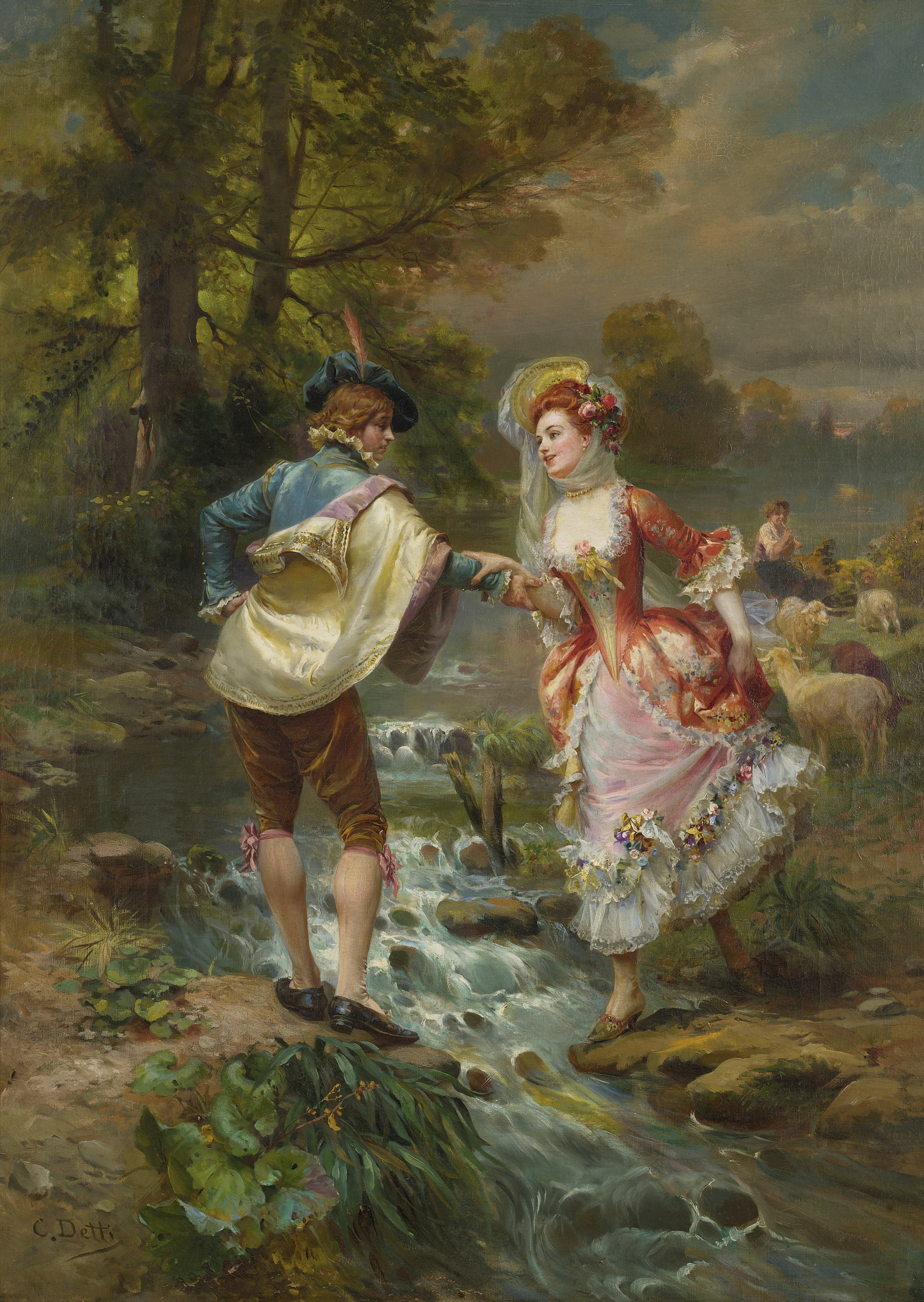
Très Galant

Cesare Agostino Detti, or Cesare-Auguste Detti (Novembre 28, 1848, in Spoleto – May 19, 1914, in Paris), was an Italian painter, best known for his historical genre scenes, largely from the 17th and 18th centuries, inspired by the Troubadour style.

== Biography ==
His father, Davide Detti, was an engineer and an amateur painter. As a result, his early interest in art was encouraged. In 1861, he made the acquaintance of Francesco Coghetti, a painter from Rome who was creating murals at the Teatro Nuovo (now known as the Teatro Nuovo Gian Carlo Menotti). Coghetti suggested that Detti receive formal training at the Accademia di San Luca, where he was a professor. Detti studied there until 1866 and came under the influence of Marià Fortuny, who introduced him to the work of the Macchiaioli.

Upon graduating, he began to travel extensively, spending several years in Naples and exhibiting there in 1872. Although he had originally decided to settle in Rome, he visited Paris in 1876 and met Adolphe Goupil, one of the leading art dealers of his time. Not only did Goupil agree to exhibit his works, but he also arranged to make them into engravings for his bourgeois customers.

He eventually decided to stay in Paris and held his first exhibit at the Salon in 1877. His commitment to Paris was further strengthened when, in 1880, he married Juliette-Emilie Filieuse, with whom he had two daughters and a son. In 1883, the family relocated to the commune of Bourron-Marlotte, just outside of Paris. There, he became associated with a society of independent landscape painters known as the Groupe de Marlotte.

In 1888, he participated in the Italian Exhibition in London. He also held showings at the Exposition Universelle (1889), where he was vice-president of the "Italian Committee", and the Exposition Universelle (1900), where he was awarded a silver medal. His later years were filled with travels, including Latin America and a trip to the United States from 1906 to 1910.

At the outbreak of World War I, France required all foreign nationals to return to their home countries. Detti had never taken French citizenship, so he was forced to return to Rome. While there, he received a call that his son was seriously ill and he went back to Paris, where he died shortly after his arrival.

== Gallery ==
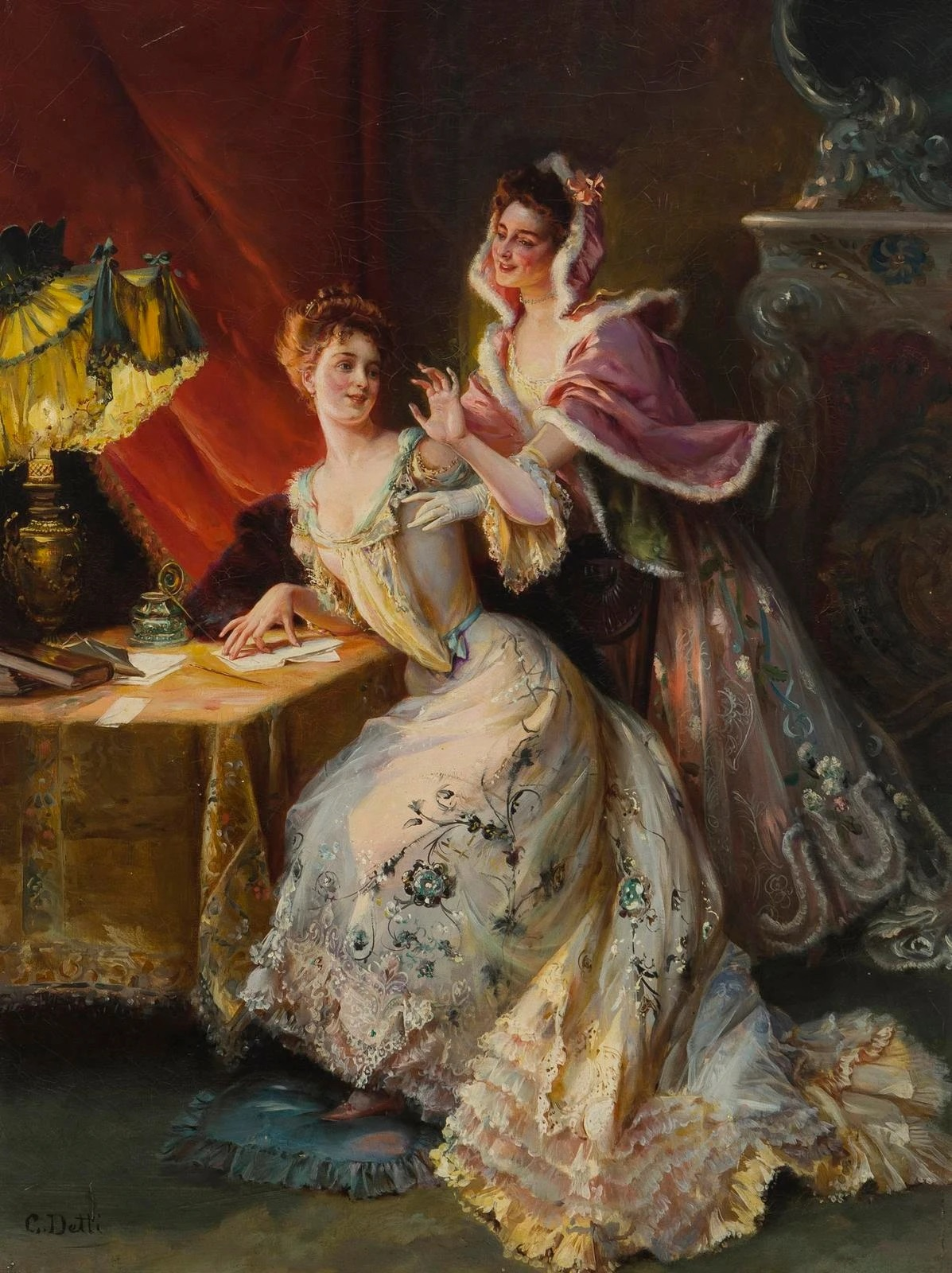
Two Women in an Interior, before 1914

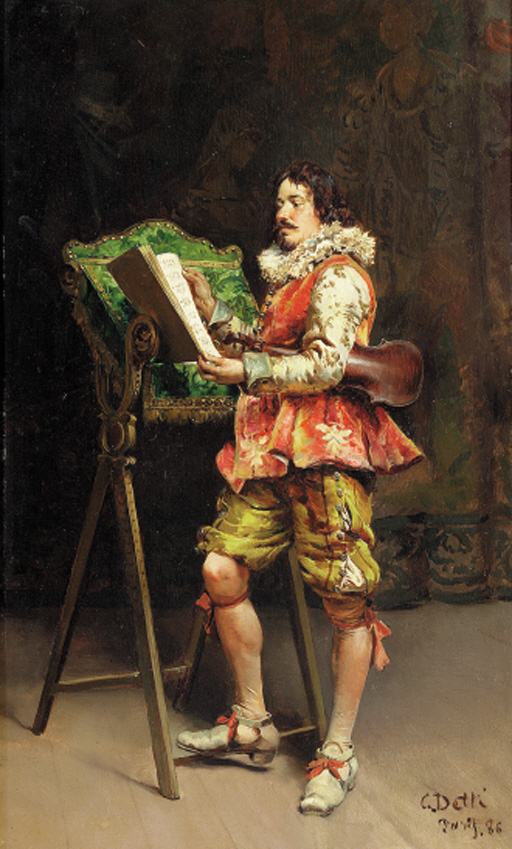
The violinist

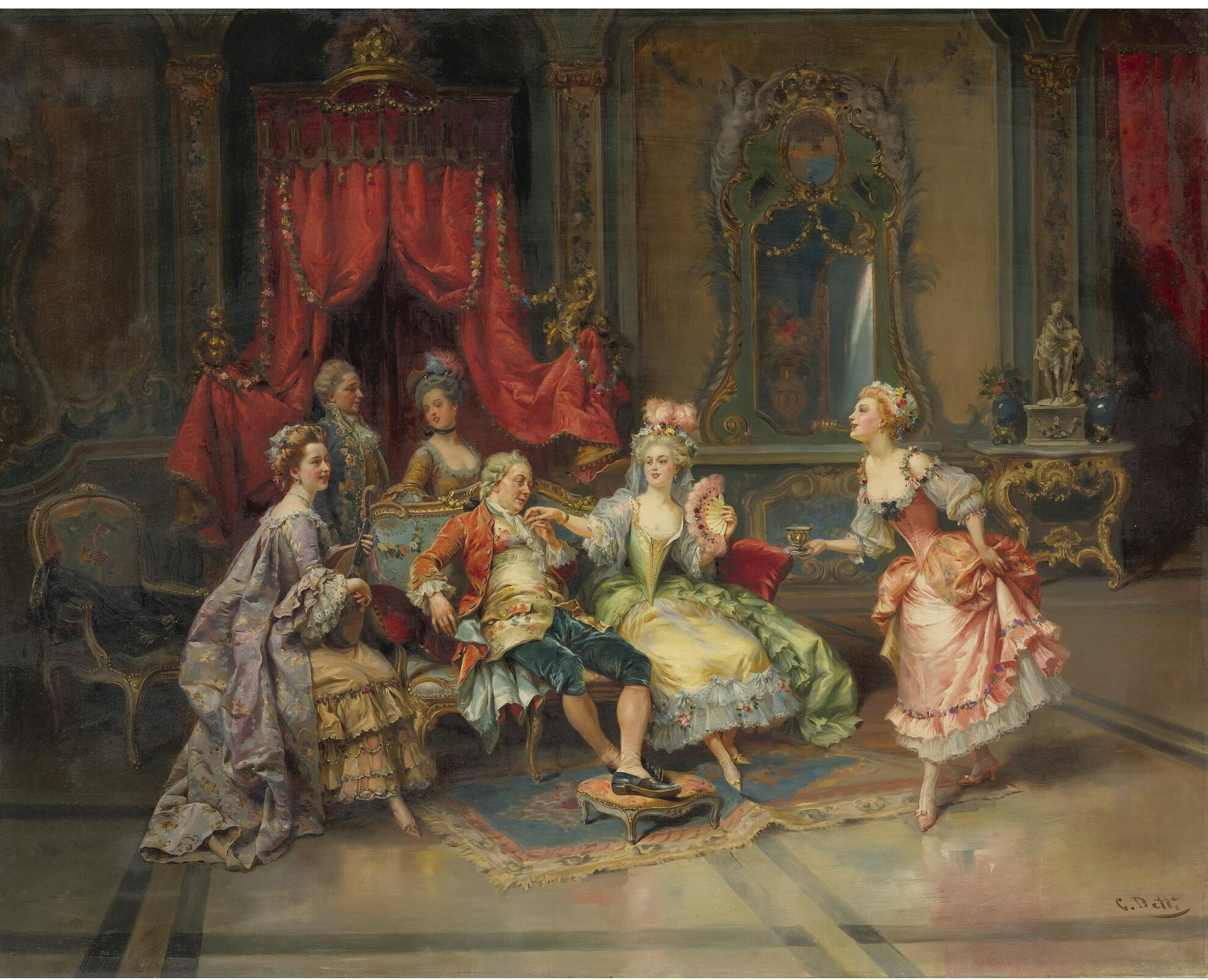
Louis XV in the Throne Room, before 1914

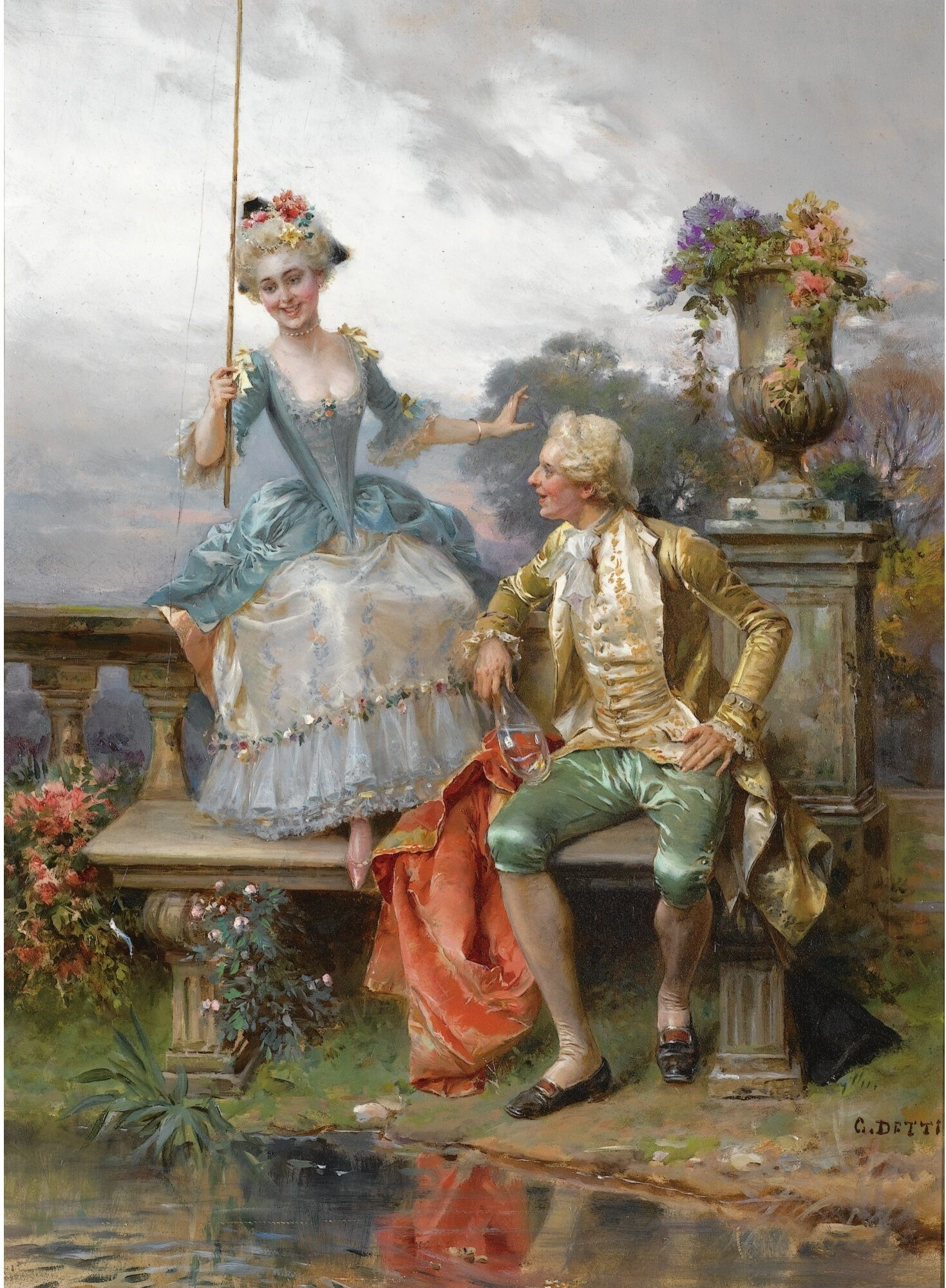
Angling for a Good Catch, before 1914

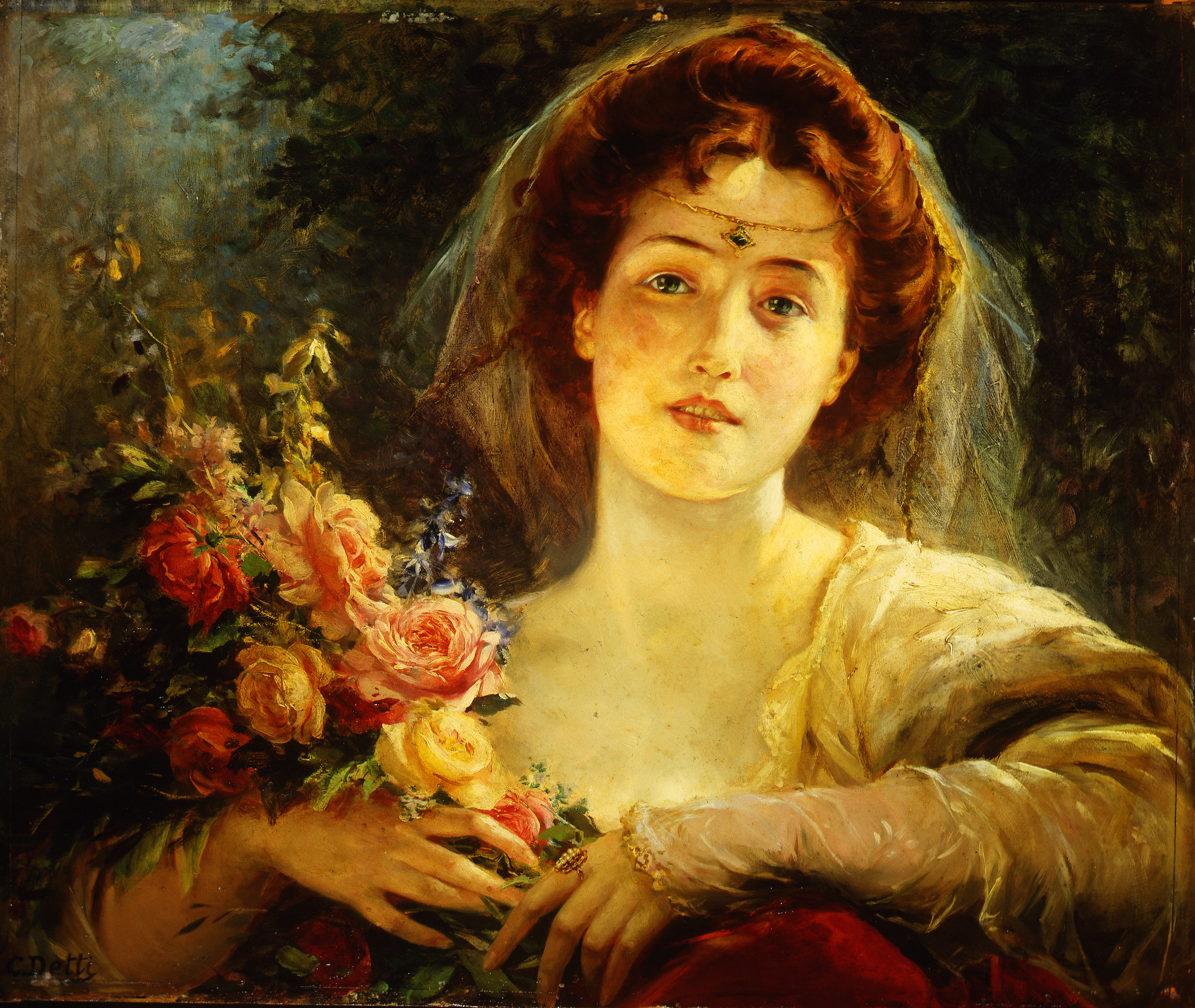
Ritratto di Giuliette Detti, before 1911

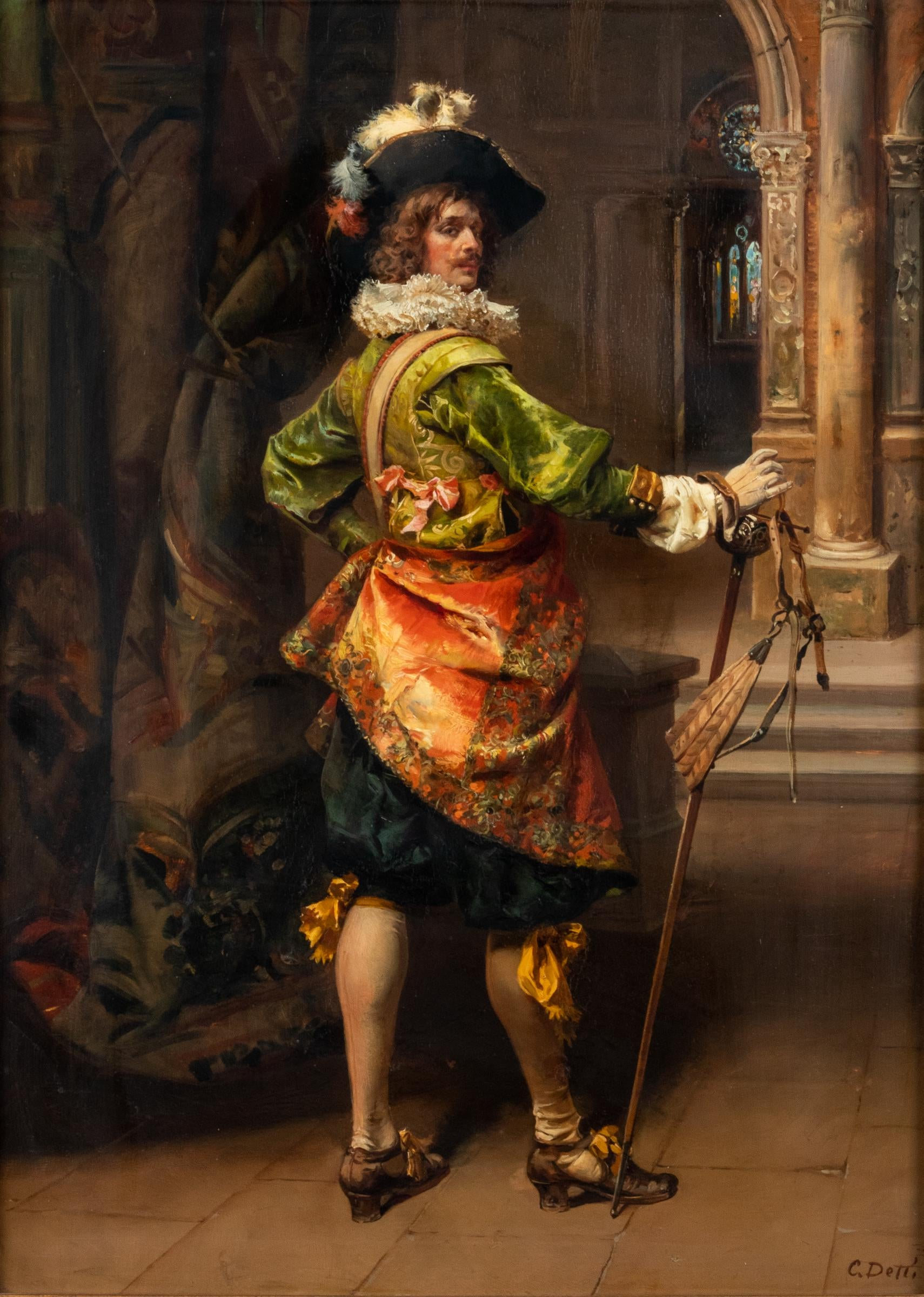
Portrait of a Cavalier
