= Angelo Mariani (conductor) =

Italian conductor and composer (1821–1873)

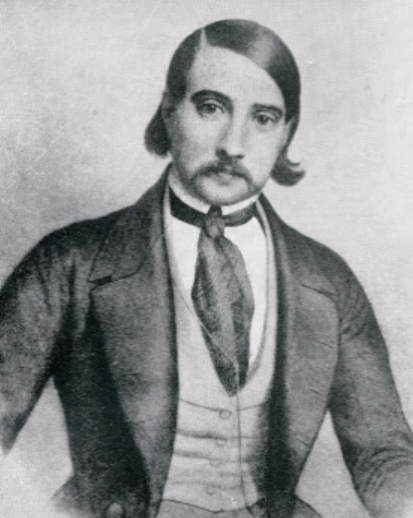
Angelo Mariani (Museo teatrale alla Scala)

Angelo Maurizio Gaspare Mariani (11 October 1821 – 13 June 1873) was an Italian opera conductor and composer. His work as a conductor drew praise from Giuseppe Verdi, Giacomo Meyerbeer, Gioachino Rossini and Richard Wagner, and he was a longtime personal friend of Verdi's, although they had a falling out towards the end of Mariani's life. He conducted at least two world premieres (Verdi's Aroldo and Faccio's Amleto); and at least 4 Italian premieres (Meyerbeer's L'Africana, Verdi's Don Carlo, and Lohengrin and Tannhäuser by Wagner).

== Biography ==
Angelo Mariani was born in Ravenna in 1821. He studied the violin at the Accademia Filarmonica of Ravenna. At age 15 he played in concerts in the Romagna. He then studied harmony and composition with a nobleman-priest, Girolamo Roberti, and then with a monk named Levrini, a pupil of Stanislao Mattei, at a monastery in Ravenna.

In 1843 he played the viola in an opera orchestra at Macerata and wrote two overtures, which were performed. He went to Faenza in 1844 as teacher and conductor at the Academy there. One of his overtures came to the attention of Gioachino Rossini, who had it performed. He then worked in Trento (where he made his debut as an operatic conductor), Bologna (where he studied counterpoint with Marchesi) and Messina. At Messina, the orchestra refused to play under him. He wrote pieces for the Messina Royal Orphanage's brass band and for the Academy there. After further work in Naples, Bologna and Messina (where again the orchestra was hostile to him, but he possibly played in the orchestra rather than conduct), in 1846 he had a fresh start as a conductor in Milan. He appeared first at the Teatro Re and then at the Teatro Carcano. He also conducted later at Stradella and Vicenza.

He claimed to have abolished the system whereby an opera orchestra was jointly conducted by a maestro concertatore at the cembalo and a violin-conductor. This may be what led to his trouble in Messina.

He had his first great success with Giuseppe Verdi's I due Foscari (1846) and Nabucco (1847), both in Milan.

In September 1847 he conducted Giovanni Pacini's music for a performance of Sophocles' Oedipus Rex, with a colossal chorus and orchestra. This led to his being appointed conductor of the Hofteatret in Copenhagen in November. While there, King Christian VIII of Denmark died, and Mariani's Requiem Mass written for the late king was performed twice.

Mariani returned to Italy after the revolution of March 1848 and enrolled in the volunteers. From there, he went to Constantinople, where he conducted the Italian Theatre for two years, in succession to Giuseppe Donizetti, the well-known composer's brother. He also composed two dramatic cantatas, and for the visit of Sultan Abdülmecid I to the newly rebuilt Naum Theatre, a new national hymn, the Turkish words of which the Italian singers had learned phonetically. The National Hymn has been recorded.

In December 1851 he returned to Messina for four months, before going to Naples, and then as conductor for the Teatro Carlo Felice in Genoa. He intended to stay for only two months, but his contract was made permanent, and he spent the majority of the rest of his life there, and also died there. His reputation was now strong, and he was offered positions in places such as Paris, Madrid, and Naples, but seemed unable to make up his mind about any of them, so all these offers lapsed. He made the acquaintance of Verdi in around 1853, and they became firm friends.

On 16 August 1857, he conducted the premiere performance of Verdi's Aroldo, a reworking of his earlier opera Stiffelio, at the Teatro Nuovo in Rimini.

On 30 May 1865 he conducted the premiere of Franco Faccio's opera Amleto at the Teatro Carlo Felice in Genoa, followed that year by conducting the Italian premiere of Giacomo Meyerbeer's L'Africana at the Teatro Comunale di Bologna. Two years later, on 27 October 1867, the Italian premiere of Verdi's Don Carlo was presented at the same theatre with Mariani's involvement.

In late 1868, Verdi asked Mariani to be the conductor for a requiem mass he was planning in honour of Gioachino Rossini, who had died on 13 November. This would be a collaboration between 13 composers, including Verdi himself. Mariani agreed to be involved in the organising committee, although he was less than enthusiastic (since he was simultaneously engaged in the commemorative celebrations for Rossini in Pesaro). The 13 composers all wrote their sections of the work (Verdi's was the "Libera me, Domine"), but the planned performance on the first anniversary of Rossini's death did not happen because disagreements arose with Mariani regarding the performance in the Basilica of San Petronio in Bologna. On 4 November, to Verdi's great sorrow, the organising committee formally abandoned the project. Verdi blamed this in considerable part on Mariani's lack of energy and commitment, and it marked the real beginning of a permanent break in their friendship (although there are indications trouble was already brewing in 1867

In the following years, Mariani tried to heal the rift, writing letters to Verdi expressing his love and admiration for him, but Verdi refused to be swayed, and continued to castigate Mariani for what he considered to be his failure over the Rossini Requiem. A complicating factor was Mariani's romantic relationship with the soprano Teresa Stolz, a favourite of Verdi's (she was his choice for the title role in the Milan premiere of Aida in February 1872, which as far as Verdi was concerned was the real premiere). Mariani and Stolz were engaged to be married. However, around 1871 she left him, in very unclear circumstances. There were suggestions and even public accusations that she was also carrying on an affair with Verdi, but this has never been proved to be true.

Despite Verdi's break with Mariani personally, he still had respect for him as a conductor, and he invited him to conduct the world premiere of Aida in Cairo in December 1871. Mariani declined, saying he was not well enough to travel. This was indeed true, as he was already suffering symptoms of the cancer that would kill him less than two years later. However, it served only to further widen the rift between the two men.

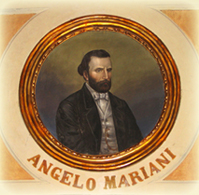
Angelo Mariani-portrait in later life

On 1 November 1871, Mariani conducted the Italian premiere of Richard Wagner's Lohengrin at the Teatro Communale di Bologna to great acclaim. This was the first performance of any Wagner opera in Italy. On 9 November, Verdi attended a Mariani performance of Lohengrin and annotated a copy of the vocal score with his impressions and opinions of Wagner (this was almost certainly his first exposure to Wagner's music). In 1872, Mariani conducted the Italian premiere of Wagner's Tannhäuser, also at Bologna, but it was much less successful than Lohengrin had been.

He also composed a number of songs, some of which have been recorded.

In June 1873, aged only 51, Angelo Mariani died of cancer in the attic of the Palazzo Sauli, a house he had long rented from Verdi in Genoa.

The Teatro Angelo Mariani in Sant'Agata Feltria (first built in 1605) was rededicated and renamed in honour of Mariani. Today, there is an Associazione Musicale Angelo Mariani in Ravenna.
