= Marcella Lotti della Santa =

Italian opera singer (1831–1901)

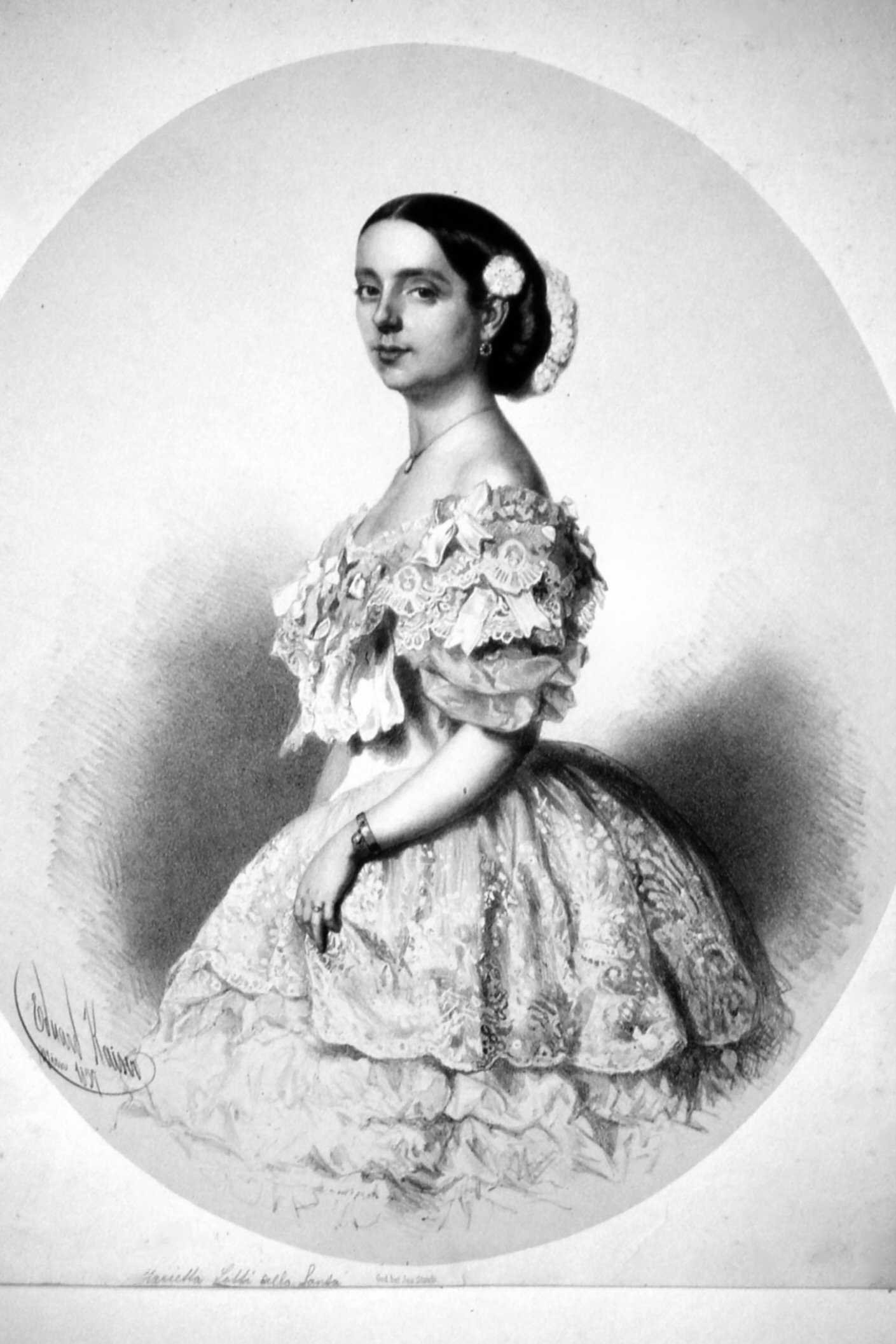
Marcella Lotti della Santa (1831–1901)

Marcella Lotti della Santa (sometimes incorrectly called Marcellina) (September 1831 – 9 February 1901) was an Italian opera singer who had an active international career during the 1850s and 1860s. One of her nation's leading sopranos, she drew particular acclaim for her portrayal of Verdi heroines. She was married to baritone Luigi della Santa.

== Biography ==
Born Marcella Lotti in Mantua, Lotti della Santa studied singing with Alberto Mazzucato in Milan before making her professional opera debut in 1850 in Constantinople with a traveling Italian opera troupe as Alice in Meyerbeer's Robert le Diable. She quickly became one of the leading sopranos in Italy. As early as 1852 she was starring in operas at La Scala and the Teatro Carlo Felice. At La Scala she drew particular acclaim for her portrayal of Odabella in Giuseppe Verdi's Attila.

On 16 August 1857, Lotti della Santa sang Mina in the world premiere of Verdi's Aroldo for the opening of the Teatro Nuovo in Rimini. From 1857 to 1858 she appeared as a guest at the Mariinsky Theatre in St. Petersburg and in 1860 she was a guest artist at Her Majesty's Theatre in London. She was highly active at the Teatro di San Carlo in Naples during the years 1862, 1866 and 1869–1870, singing such roles as Marguerite di Valois Les Huguenots and Princess Eudoxie in La Juive. While there she notably created parts in several world premieres, including the title heroines in Saverio Mercadante's Virginia (1866), Errico Petrella's Giovanna di Napoli (1869), and Gaetano Donizetti's Gabriella di Vergy (1869). She had further success at La Scala from 1863 to 1865.

Lotti della Santa retired from the stage around 1870 in order to manage her family. She died in Paratico at the age of 69.
