= Gallery (theatre) =

Type of balcony or platform in a theatre or church

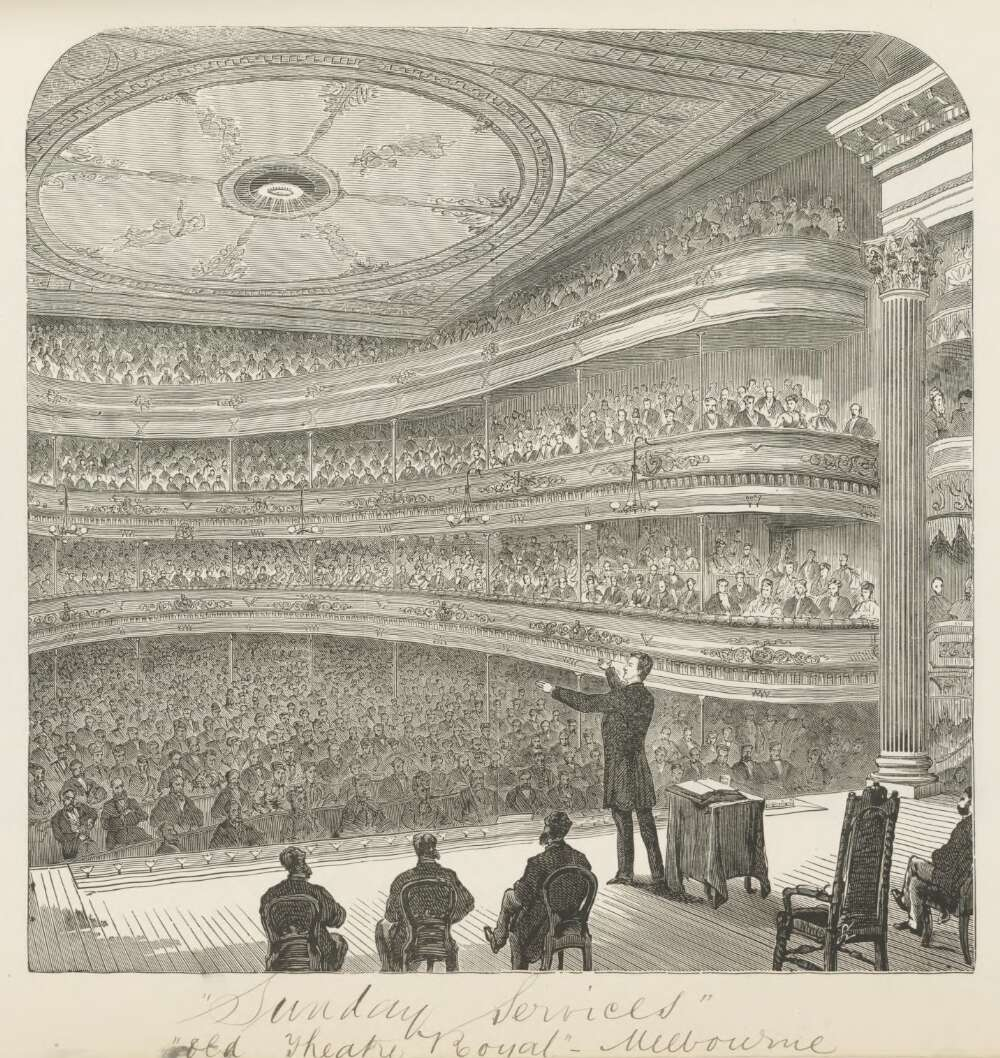
Theatre Royal, Melbourne c. 1873. The gallery is the topmost section of the audience.

The gallery of a theatre or church is a form of balcony, an elevated platform generally supported by columns or brackets, which projects from an interior wall, in order to accommodate additional audience.

It may specifically refer to the highest such platform, and carries the cheapest seats in theatres.

== See also ==
- Peanut gallery
