= Francesco Coghetti =

Italian painter (1801–1875)

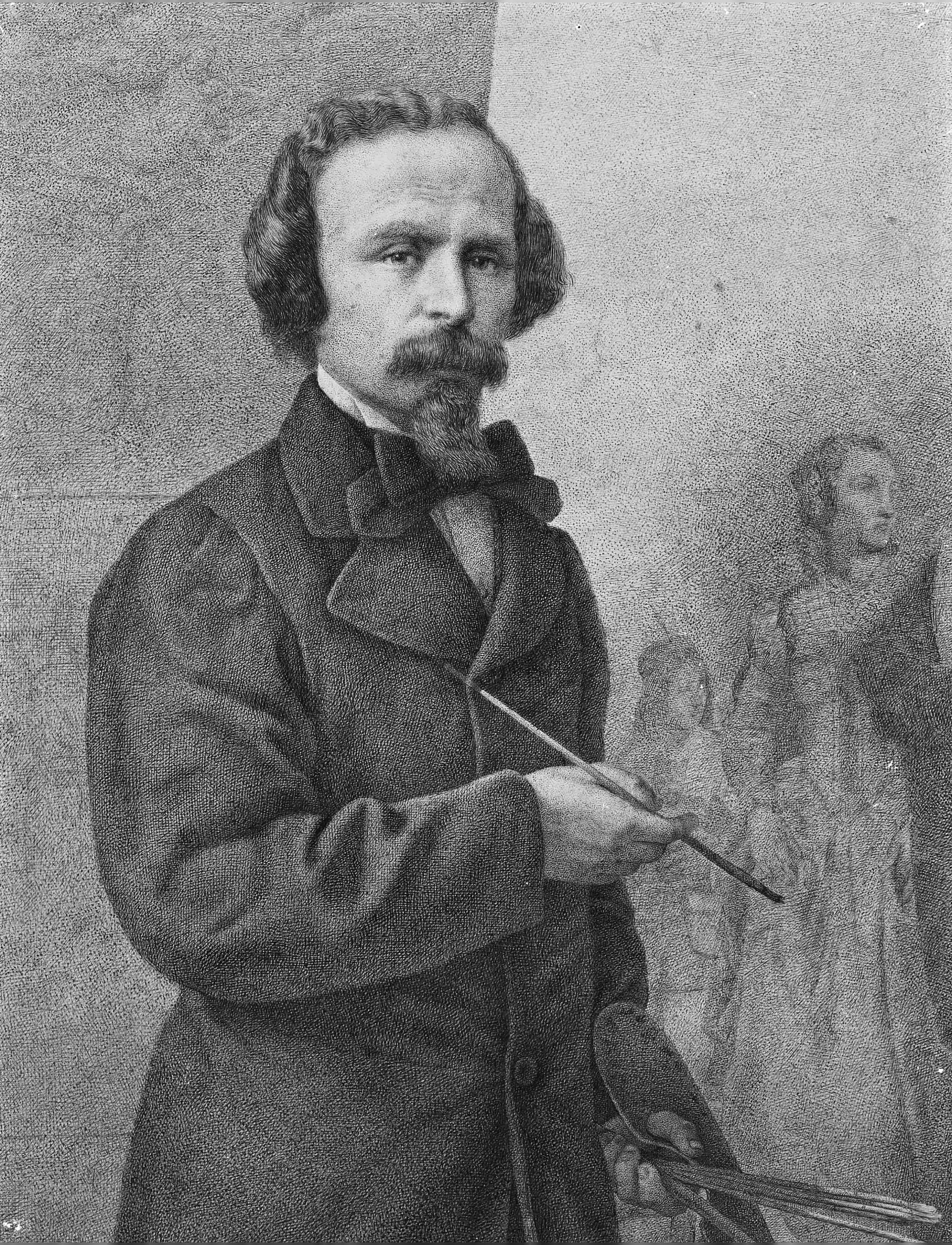
- Self-portrait
- Born: 12 July 1801; Bergamo, Italy
- Died: 20 April 1875 (aged 73); Rome, Kingdom of Italy
- Known for: Painting

Francesco Coghetti (12 July 1801 – 20 April 1875) was an Italian painter and art school administrator.

== Biography ==
Coghetti was born into a wealthy family, which allowed him to attend prestigious private schools. After completing his primary studies, he enrolled at the Accademia Carrara, where he studied with Giuseppe Diotti. In 1818, he won the Accademia's drawing competition.

In 1820, he moved to Milan. The following year, he won an award for drawing and design from the Brera Academy. This encouraged him to move to Rome and, thanks to his father's financial support, he was able to study with Vincenzo Camuccini. He also enjoyed the patronage of Cardinal Angelo Mai, who was a fellow Bergamaschi. In 1825, he was married. The 1830s were a very successful time for him, during which he won several awards and received a continual flow of commissions from all over Europe.

In 1844, he was offered the position of Director at the Academy of San Carlos in Mexico City, but declined to accept. Fourteen years later, faced with declining commissions, he accepted a position as President of the Accademia di San Luca. In the late 1860s, he became involved in politics as well as art, when preparations were being made for the Papal States to be annexed to the Kingdom of Italy. The Accademia was considered to be part of the Pope's temporal domain and was transformed into the "Royal Academy".

It was a difficult process and, because he had already come under criticism for his performance in office, he was relieved of his teaching duties in 1873 and suspended as President. Two years later, he died of apoplexy, on 20 April 1875.

== Works ==
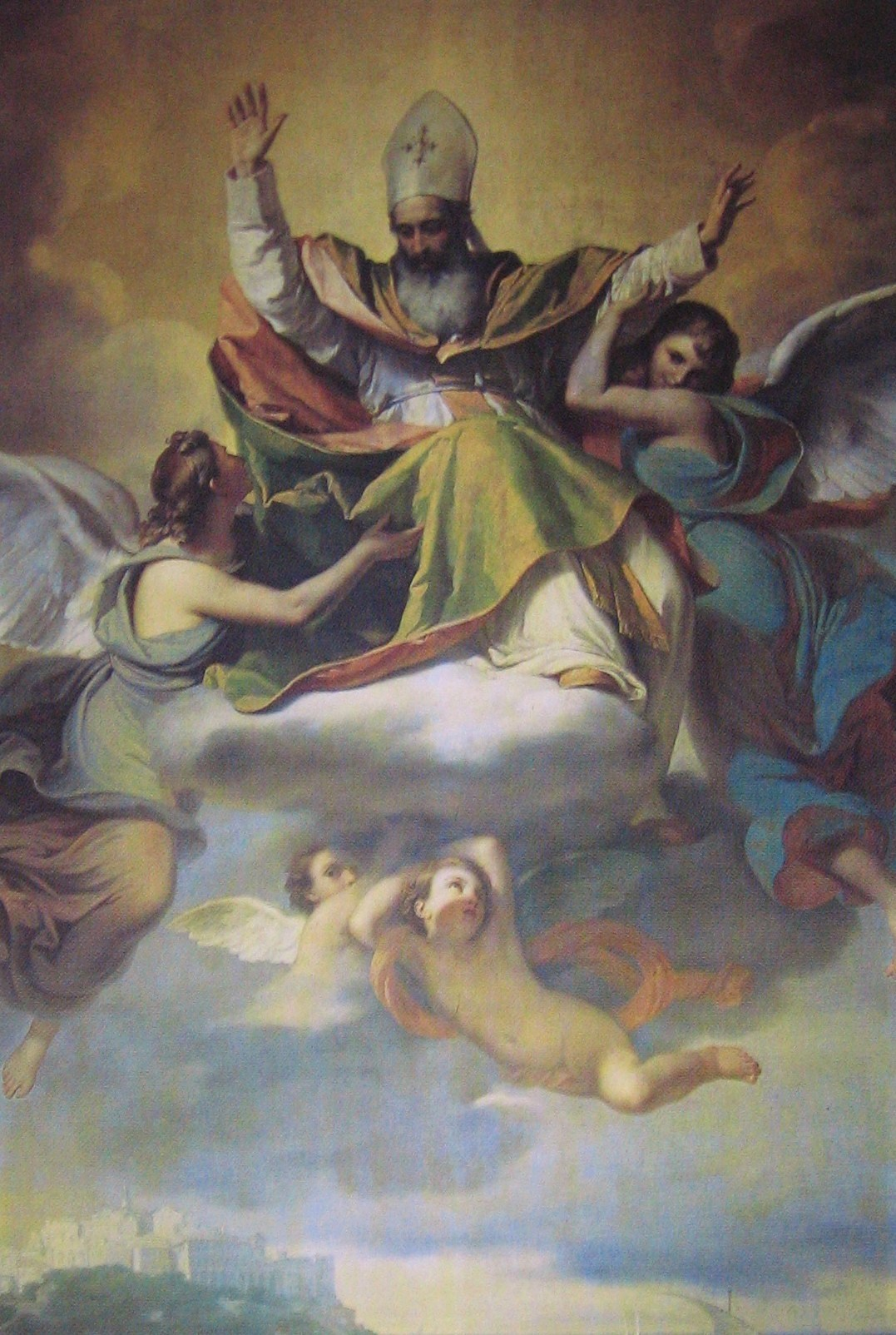
Apotheosis of St. Augustine, duomo of
Porto Maurizio

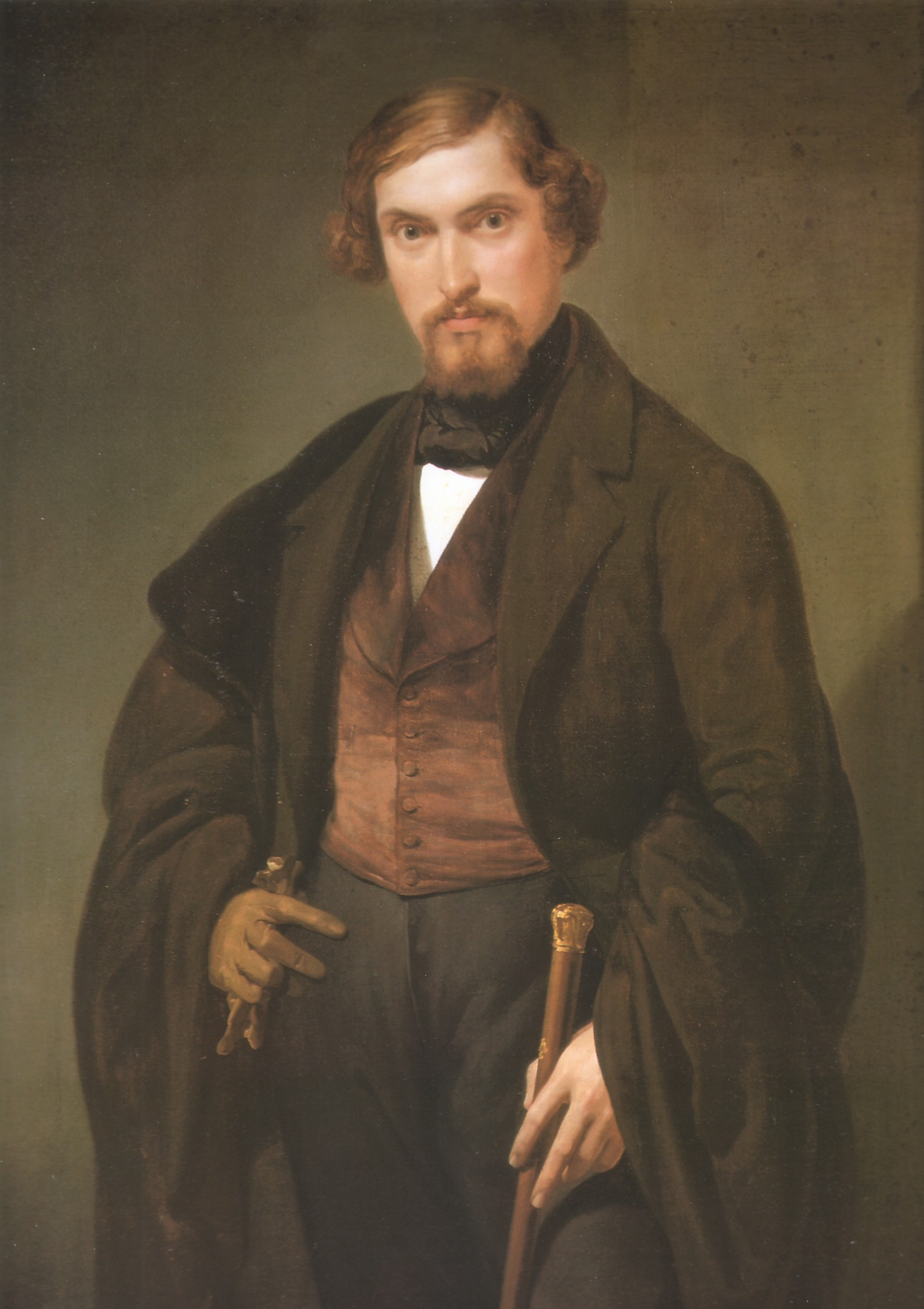
Portrait of Giovanni Presti, now at the Accademia Carrara in Bergamo

Among his works are:

- Two altar-pieces at the Accademia Carrara.
- Several frescoes for the Palazzo Morlachi in Bergamo.
- Frescoes in the cupola of the Bergamo Cathedral.
- Scenes from the Life of Alexander. The Four Elements. The Triumph of Bacchus. The Battle of the Amazons; frescoes (1837–1839), now lost, for the Villa Torlonia, Rome.
- The Assumption for a church in Porto Maurizio.
- Ceiling frescoes of angels and prophets; Julius II lays the first stone of the St. Peter's Basilica and Sixtus IV blesses armies fighting Turks, and Christ clears moneylenders from the temple (Presbytery); (1846–1849) for the Cathedral in Savona.
- Pope Eugene III blesses the armies of Amadeo II leaving for a crusade commissioned by Queen Maria Cristina in 1846 for the castle of Aglié.
- Martyrdom of St. Lawrence (Sacristy) and St Stephen Martyrdom (chapel) for Basilica of Saint Paul Outside the Walls in 1853.
- Caesar Crossing the Rubicon (1857) stage curtain for Rimini's Teatro Nuovo
- Hannibal defeated under the Walls of Spoleto (1861) stage curtain for Spoleto's Teatro Nuovo
