= Narciso Malatesta =

Italian painter

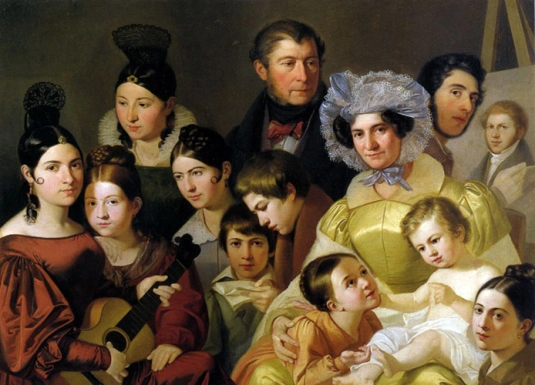
The Malatesta Family

Narciso Malatesta (26 October 1835, Venice – 26 September 1896, Cilla Rometta near Sassuolo) was an Italian painter, active in Modena, mainly depicting historical and sacred subjects in a Realist style.

== Biography ==
He was the son of the painter Adeodato Malatesta, and began his studies at the Academy of Fine Arts of Modena. After studying there, he traveled to Florence. In 1860, he married Adele Mari, daughter of a deputy to Parliament, Adriano Mari. Their son, Baccio, would become director of the Gazzettino artistico letterario of Florence. Among his works are Il Falconiere (Pinacoteca di Brera, Milan); Il Numismatico (Academy of Fine Arts of Modena); Il Varchi che legge le Storie a Cosimo de' Medici (Gallery of Modern Art, in the Palazzo Pitti, Florence); Carlo d' Angiò che visita lo studio di Cimabue; Dante che riceve Boccaccio; La moneta antica; La famiglia del disertore; L' aia di Mileto che ritrae Giulio Cesare; and La famiglia del saltimbanco. He was professor of design, photography, and topography at the Military Academy of Modena.
