= Giovanni Ricordi =

Italian musician (1785–1853)

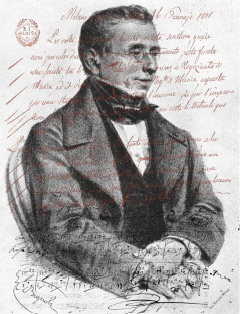
Giovanni Ricordi, 1785—1853, founder of Casa Ricordi

Giovanni Ricordi (3 March 1785 – 15 March 1853) was an Italian violinist and the founder of the classical music publishing company Casa Ricordi. The musicologist Philip Gossett described him as "a genius and positive force in the history of Italian opera".

Ricordi was born in Milan in 1785 to Gianbatista Ricordi, who was a glassmaker, and Angiola de Medici. Ricordi studied the violin from an early age and, for a short time, became the concertmaster and conductor of the small puppet theatre Fiando. In 1803 he created a copisteria in Milan where he worked as a music copyist and dealer in printed music and instruments with the Teatro Carcano, which opened in that year, and with the Teatro Lentasio. In 1807 he studied in Leipzig at the Breitkopf & Härtel company to learn the techniques of engraving and printing. When he returned to Milan in early 1808, he founded his publishing company with a partner who dropped out by the middle of the year.

As MacNutt notes, during its first decade the company produced some 30 publications each year. That number increased to 300 after 1814 because Giovanni had secured a succession of contracts, including one in that year which allowed him to publish all the music performed at the La Scala opera house, a contract won due to his work as a prompter and exclusive copyist. As he began to acquire a stock of manuscripts from existing theatres and copyists, he added a clause in his contracts which allowed, at the end of a run of performances of an opera, for the company to acquire the rights to it for successive presentations elsewhere. The contracts allowed the company to assemble a significant catalogue of music which became the basis of the Ricordi company.

It was through the gradual accession to the rights to control La Scala's archives, as well as subsequently-produced operas, that he was able to bypass the limitations on publishing full scores, and—as Gossett notes—"not be its employee but a private entrepreneur from whom theatres rented materials". In contrast, many of Ricordi's competitors produced "hackwork manuscripts" in no way based on the composers' autographs.

By the 1840s and throughout that decade, Casa Ricordi had grown to be the largest music publisher in southern Europe and in 1842 the company created the musical journal the Gazzetta Musicale di Milano.

His adopted practices radically changed the music publishing market, ensuring that composers received revenues not only at the time they delivered the composition, but also for the subsequent productions mounted elsewhere. In 1825 he acquired all the manuscripts belong to the Teatro alla Scala, and began to circulate handwritten copies intended for rental, which alongside the sale of the reductions for soloists and piano, produced another level of demand.

In addition, Ricordi's use of new techniques such as lithography and intaglio printing, he was able to reduce costs and increase the print runs. Finally, the company produced vocal scores and then complete scores.

Ricordi befriended many major Italian operatic composers of his time, including Rossini, Bellini, Donizetti and Verdi whose works he published. Ricordi's correspondence with Verdi is studied to gain a full insight into the latter's activities.

Ricordi died on 15 March 1853 in Milan.
