= Marcello Aitiani =

Italian composer and painter

Marcello Aitiani (Castrovillari, 1951) is an Italian painter and composer. He has carried out musical and classical studies. Graduated in Law, at the same time he dedicated himself to research in the field of visual arts and music, and telematic communication.

== Biography ==
Aitiani works in the visual sectors of painting, sculpture, environmental works, such as the rose window of the Collegiate Church of San Gimignano, the sculptures and stained glass windows in the complex of Koningsoord, Arnhem-Paesi Bassi, and in music.

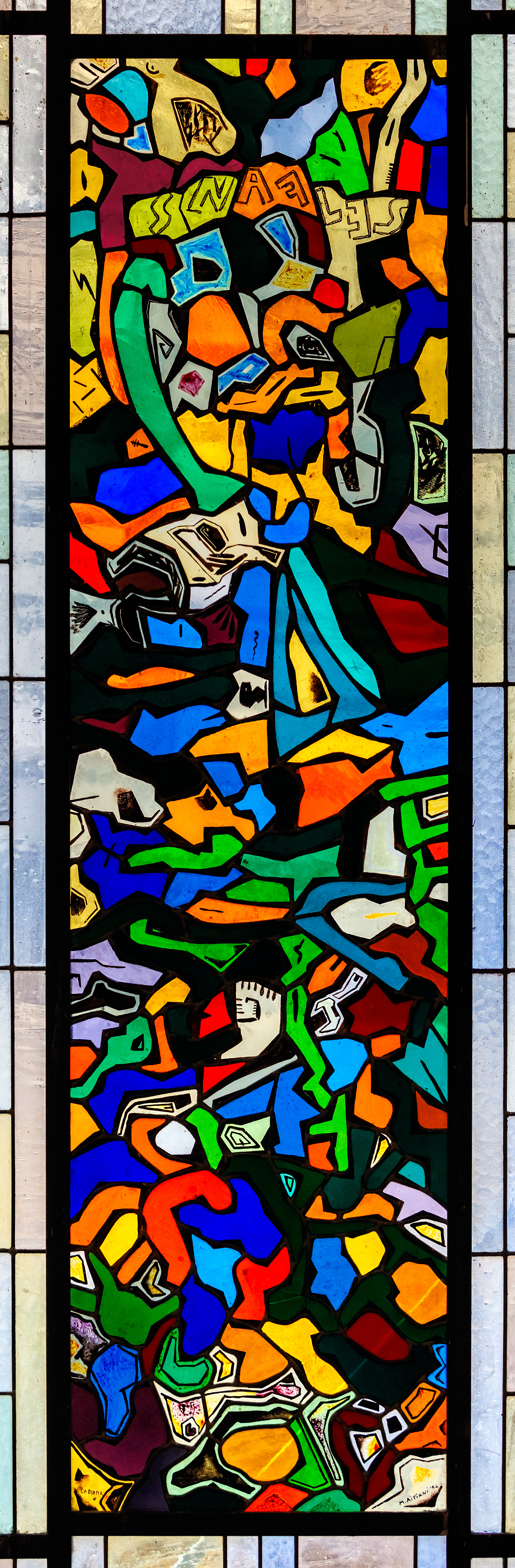
Stained glass in the Società of the Contrada della Selva, Siena. Marcello Aitiani. 1992.

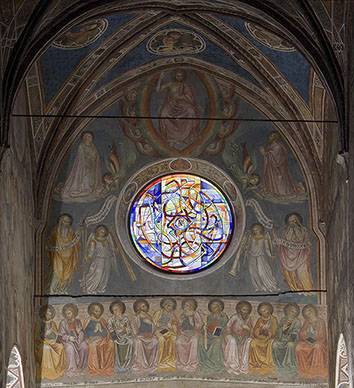
Rose window Iridescenze, by Marcello Aitiani, Church of San Gimignano

At the end of the eighties, Aitiani joined the Florentine artistic current, which has been active since the end of World War II up to the present, including Sylvano Bussotti, Giuseppe Chiari, Giancarlo Cardini, Albert Mayr, Sergio Maltagliati, Daniele Lombardi, Pietro Grossi. These artists have experimented the interaction among sound, sign and vision, a synaesthetics of art derived from historical avant-gardes, from Kandinskij to futurism, to Scrjabin and Schoenberg, all the way to Bauhaus.

His work has been exhibited in festivals, galleries and even international institutions, including: Academy of fine arts of Catanzaro; Museum of Modern Art-Rio de Janeiro; National Museum of Buenos Aires; Triennale of Milan; Museum of the twentieth century -Florence, Logge Vasari-Arezzo; Museo Mart-Rovereto; Palazzo Vecchio-Florence; Palazzo Ducale-Mantova; Corte degli Spedalinghi-Pisa; Museo- Luigi Pecci-Prato; National Central Library-Florence, MAXXI - National Museum of 21st Century Arts-Roma.

In painting and in the plastic arts, in music, in writing, he worked by putting these individual disciplines in mutual interaction.

Starting from 1984, he became interested in the nascent phenomenon of new digital technologies, sensing the extent of the practical and thought revolution that they would soon bring about, and came into contact with musicians like Pietro Grossi, Albert Mayr, Francesco Giomi. Alongside his artistic commitment, Aitiani has carried out theoretical activities: he has taught at the University, has organized conferences and took part as a speaker. He has created object-books and published numerous articles, essays and books.

== Discography ==
- Suono, segno, gesto visione a Firenze (Sound, sign, gesture, vision in Florence)
  - (CD 1): Sylvano Bussotti, Giancarlo Cardini, Giuseppe Chiari, Daniele Lombardi
  - (CD 2): Pietro Grossi, Giuseppe Chiari, Giancarlo Cardini, Albert Mayr, Daniele Lombardi, Marcello Aitiani, Sergio Maltagliati (Atopos music 1999-2008).
    The path of more than fifty years of musical culture in Florence, since the end of the Second World War, is documented in these two audio CDs. This audio recording contains the meeting of composers and pianists who are the protagonists of the Music of Art in Florence, a significant phenomenon in the history of the second half of the twentieth century.

== Selection of works ==
- Esse (Cuma,1988)
- Nave Di Luce (Siena-Firenze, 1990; Genova-Firenze, 1991)
- Lasciarsi Attraversare Dalla Natura (Certosa di Pontignano, 2004)
- Sofia Azzurra-Sintonie con Pavel Florenskij (museo diocesano Arborense di Oristano, 2018)
- Stained glass in the Società of the Contrada della Selva, Siena. 1992.

== Bibliography ==
- 1985 Passione di luce. Cromoscritture dalla "Teoria dei colori di Goethe, nella collana "Le brache di Gutenberg, a cura di L. Caruso, Belforte Editore, Livorno .
- 1990 Riflessioni e note, in Marcello Aitiani, Nave di Luce. Arte, Musica, Telematica, Electa, Milano.
- 1991 The Artwork Nave di luce A Journey into Telematics, Art And Music, with Francesco Giomi, in "Leonardo Journal of International Society for the Art, Sciences and Technology, vol. 24, n. 2.
- 1992 Spirale de vie vermeille, in "Le carré bleu. Revue internationale d'architecture », 3/4, Parigi.
- 1998 Fata Morgana Considerazioni sull'arte nell'era della telematica, con la prefazione dello scienziato Enzo Tiezzi, Pezzini Editore, Viareggio .
- 2001 La notte dell'arte tra il nulla e l'ineffabile, in La cattedrale come spazio sacro. Saggi sul duomo di Firenze, a cura di T. Verdon e A. Innocenti, Edizioni Edifir, Firenze.
- 2001 Bellezza e antipaesaggio delle brutte Arpie, in "La Nuova Città. Rivista fondata da Giovanni Michelacci, 2/3 Firenze.
- 2002 Daniele Lombardi, Attraversamenti, La musica in Toscana dal 1945 ad oggi 2002, Firenze, ed. Maschetto&Musolino.
- 2019 When Sound Becomes Form Sperimentazioni sonore in Italia dal 1950 al 2000 ed. Manfredi-ISBN 978-88-99519-86-5
