= Turroni =

Turroni is a surname. Notable people with the surname include:

- Costantino Bresciani Turroni (1882–1963), Italian economist and statistician
- Fabio Casadei Turroni (born 1964), Italian novelist, musicologist, and journalist
- Pio Turroni (1906–1982), Italian anarchist
