= Romano Rizzato =

Italian illustrator (1936–2025)

Romano Rizzato (21 August 1936 – 20 January 2025) was an Italian painter and illustrator.

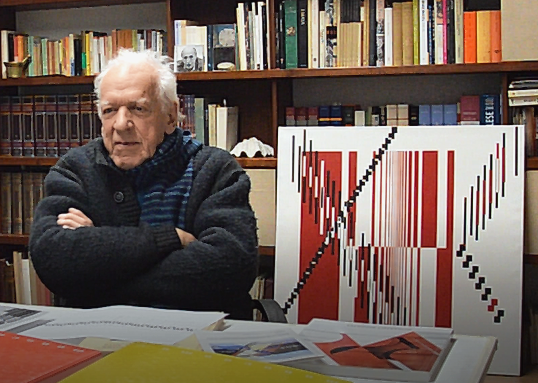
Romano Rizzato in 2019

== Biography ==
Rizzato was born in Milan on 21 August 1936. In 1959 he met the painter Mario Radice and began to frequent his studio in Como. At the same time he began his training in the field of abstract painting.

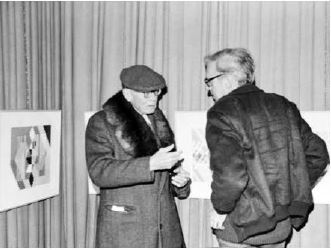
Mario Radice with Rizzato gallery Il Salotto Como 1983

Rizzato lived and worked in Milan and in Tuscany where he had his studio in an isolated rural place near Pescia.

Rizzato was active with personal exhibitions (present in museum collections).

Rizzato exhibited works in Switzerland, Holland, France, Germany, Bulgaria, Austria, Venezuela and Japan.

As an illustrator (under the pseudonym of Sergio) he experimented and applied different techniques for illustration.

Rizzato died in Uzzano on 20 January 2025, at the age of 88.

== Works ==
- 1952–1960 Landscape, Figure, Illustration: Romano Rizzato's earliest work was done, on the one hand his interest in architecture and in the human figure, and on the other, his commitment to illustration for publishing. The decision to paint views, was certainly inherited from an early twentieth century tradition and from postwar movements that sought to qualify urban suburbs as subjects for painting. Both in his portraits and in his illustrations, Rizzato is primarily concerned with the theatrical effect which the presentation.
- 1960–1967 Egg Tempera: the use of a particular technique, very much at home with the tools used for the creation of his images, and in the experimentation with the techniques best suited to the work to be done. Are significantly affected moreover, by his frequent visits to the studio of Mario Radice.

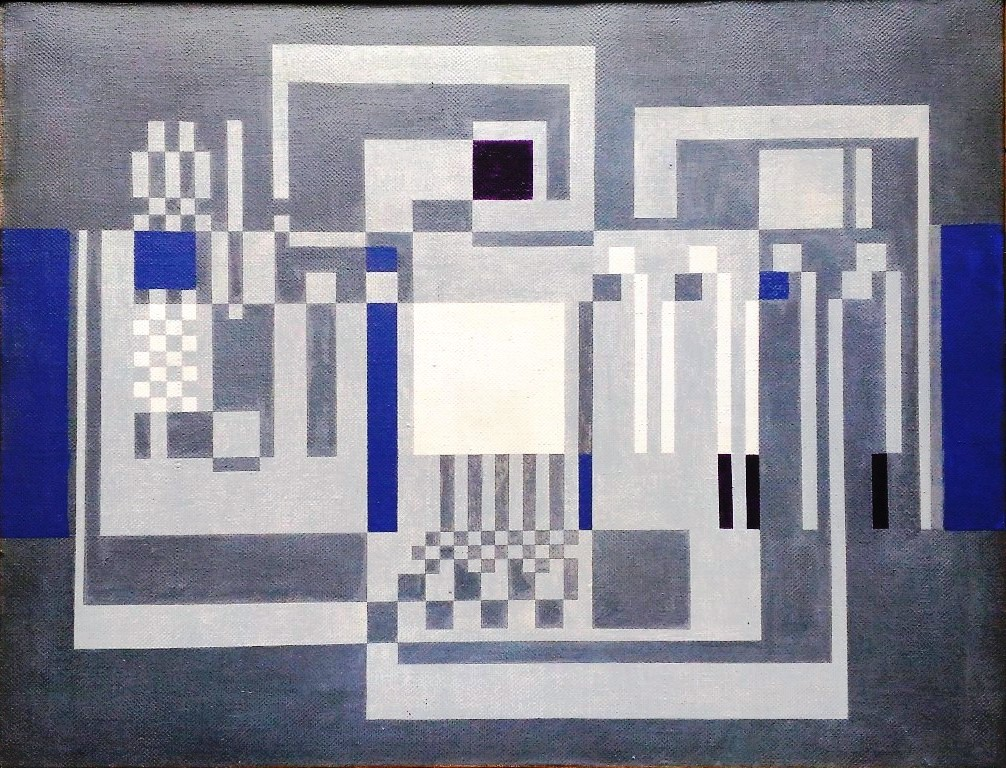
Composizione (1967)

- 1965–1969 Optical B/W: this was the period in which the image found its constructive rule, a module repeated and gradually clarified in a series of drawings. The choice of two colours is the reference to the European experiments in optical art and kinetic art research. Rather than in the instability and iridescence of a figure, Rizzato is always more interested in its architectural nature. And one of the fruits of his collaboration with Miro Cusumano was their combined creation, in 1968/69, of the work, Interata 1.
- 1969–1974 Seriality Module / Nucleus: in this phase Rizzato studied the possibility of an iteration which could invade architectural space. The title Percorso, already present in a number of works done in earlier years, acquired, due also to the dimensions handled in certain installations, a physical and environmental quality. This was the most rigorous point in the design of his work, from the formation of a module, to the ultimate identification of a rhythmic trail blazed by the repetition of an identical figure, sprang from the overlapping of different grids on the field's initial score.
- 1974–1977 Simplification Grid: the expressive route taken by Rizzato, too underwent in this period a significant reduction of the evidence accorded to a plastic solution. In this phase Rizzato reduced its complexity, by increasing the differences in the size of the cuttings and invading the whole field. In this way a disciplined, rhythmic progress is exalted in a musical sense between the time of its appreciation and the physical space of the composition.
- 1976–1985 Lowering the Colour Contrast: this working period is important in the trajectory that we have identified, because to the simplified form is added a lowering of the colour contrast between the background and the figures on it. Rizzato took up drawing again as a workshop open to diverse solutions, a feature of his work that was also to become in any case decisive in its subsequent stage.
- 1986–1989 Further Simplification of the Grid: the examples illustrated are for the most part papers, and smaller, which Rizzato produced and collected into a sort of memorandum to be used in more challenging future works. Compared to an earlier stage, the focus is now shifted to a less detailed division of the field, enabled to accept a more synthetic pace and rhythm.

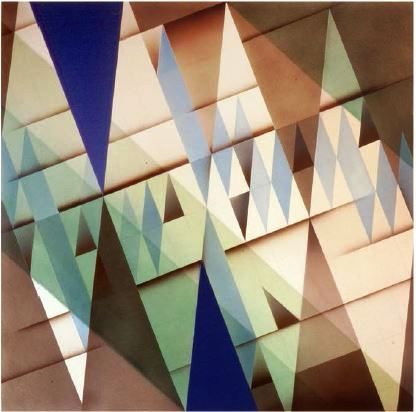
Scorrimenti Incrociati (1993–94)

- 1990–1995 Trompe l’ŒIL-Shading: the work documented here stems from experimentation with new materials and tools, professionally used for the purposes of illustration. This further development of his work decisively reveals a loss of that homogeneity, in favour of a gradation which introduces the optical effect of three-dimensionality.
- 1995–2001 Trompe- l’ŒIL – Gradation, Curved Figure: the further passage tested by Rizzato includes the adoption, of the curved line, in a semicircle, which contradicts the straight line that had until then dominated the pictorial stage. The effect of succession and description, is now achieved in a substantial continuity suggested by the borderline of the figures.
- 2001–2008 Updated to the Present: this interval seems to me to have coincided with a further polishing of the arts of narrating and deluding, and also of emphasizing the three-dimensional effect and consequently of hiding the regularity of the weft.

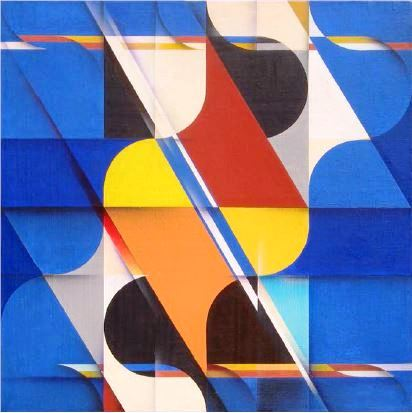
Linee Ascendenti IV (2005)

== Special projects ==
- Battimenti (2019), the musician Sergio Maltagliati uses 11 sound frequencies, from 395 to 405 (the same ones used by Pietro Grossi at the Studio di Fonologia of Florence in 1965), combined as suggested by the calligraphy of the score (graphic work) of Rizzato, realizes a inspired by his optical-kinetic period of the 60s–70s.
- The work S.G / V (1973), developed by the musician Sergio Maltagliati is read as a musical score and played through the autom@tedMusiC 2.0 generative music software. The first performance takes place at the Gallery Civico 8 in Pescia in November 2016.
- Compenetrability and Sequences (1974) project for the L.A. Middle School Muratori Vignola (MO), on oven-baked white sheet metal measuring 10 meters per side overall.
- Sculpture Fountain in white Carrara marble, made in the Nicoli art studio in Carrara, private commission (1972).
- Interata 1 (1968–69) work by Rizzato in collaboration with Miro Cusumano, in relation to the research of the 1960s

== Bibliography ==
- Giorgio Di Genova Art itineraries in Italy ed. Rubbettino, 2016.
- Claudio Rizzi Acquisitions 2011 Museo Parisi-Valle ed. Comune di Maccagno, 2011.
- Alberto Veca Works(1952–2008) catalog raisonné, ed. Bandecchi e Vivaldi Editori, 2008.pdf
- Giorgio di Genova True sun light of art ed. Bora Bologna, 2004.
- Rossana Bossaglia Geometric Watercolors ed. Contemporary Art Center – Gianfranco Bonomi, 2003.
- Beate Reifenscheid-Ronnich Fugues and Variations Treffunk Kunnst – Germania, 2002.
- Giulio Bargellini Bargellini Museum Permanent Collections Catalog ed. Bora Bologna, 2001.
- Giorgio Segato Art builds Europe ed. Cultural association arte struktura, 1996.
- Flaminio Gualdoni Paths of abstraction in Milan ed. Permanent Museum of Milan, 1995.
- Alberto Veca Romano Rizzato-The figure and the materials, 1991.
- Mario Radice In these days he exhibits at the Salotto – True abstractionism by Romano Rizzato, pubblicato su La Provincia del 27 marzo 1983. articolo
- Paola Vassalli Matite Italiane -review of Italian illustration for children-ed. Ministry of Cultural Heritage-Bologna, 1980.
- Mario Monteverdi Yearbook of Italian Visual Artists ed. Seletecnica, 1972.
- Franco Sossi Contemporary Art in Italy ed. Presenza, 1971.
- Universal Encyclopedia of Modern Painting V volume ed. Seda, 1970.
