= Daniele Lombardi =

Italian composer

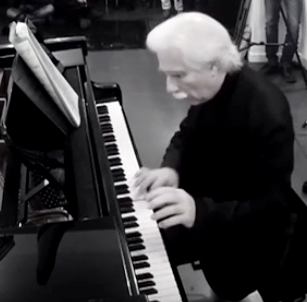
- Lombardi in 2013
- Born: August 12, 1946; Florence, Italy
- Died: March 11, 2018 (aged 71); Florence, Italy
- Education: Conservatorio Luigi Cherubini Florence
- Occupations: Composer, pianist, visual artist
- Partner: Sylvano Bussotti
- Website: danielelombardi.it

Daniele Lombardi (Florence, August 12, 1946 - Florence, March 11, 2018) was a composer, pianist and visual artist.

== Biography ==
He is an exponent and main promoter of the group of Florentine artists, operating from the end of the Second World War to today including Sylvano Bussotti, Giuseppe Chiari, Giancarlo Cardini, Albert Mayr, Pietro Grossi, Marcello Aitiani e Sergio Maltagliati. These musicians have experimented the interaction among sound, sign and vision, a synaesthetics of art derived from historical avant-gardes, from Kandinskij to futurism, to Scrjabin and Schoenberg, all the way to Bauhaus.

He worked extensively on the music of the twentieth-century avant-garde movements, including first modern performances of a large number of compositions of Futurism music.

In his work he has incorporate sign, gesture, and sound into a unitary concept of multiple perception, through analogies, contrasts, stratifications, and associations. He has produced from 1969 on, since 1990, drawings, paintings, computer graphics and videos.

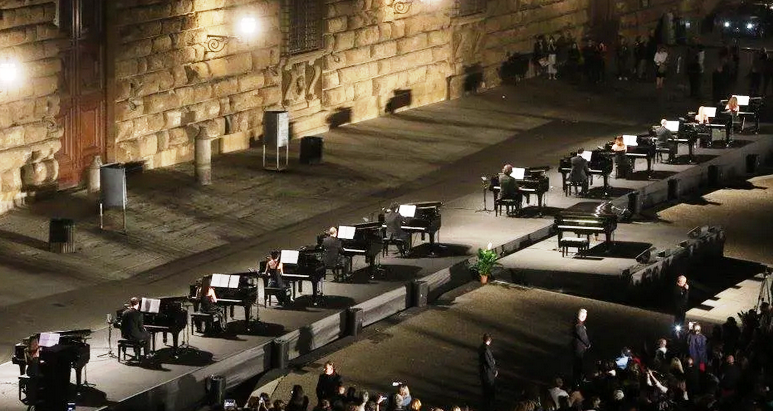
Two Symphonies for 21 pianos Uffizi, Pitti Palace, Florence

In 1998 the performance of the Two Symphonies for 21 pianos at the Uffizi Courtyard.

== Exhibitions ==
Among his exhibitions, in Italy and abroad, we recall here:

- Concerts & Performances FUTURISMUSIC Solomon R. Guggenheim Museum, New York (2014);
- Look at that music, Galleria d'Arte Moderna, Palazzo Pitti, Firenze (2013);
- Silhouettes e altre musiche, Fondazione Mudima, Milan (2007);
- Effetto Serra, Giardino di Boboli, Florence (2006);
- Sound Enigmas, MLAC Museo Laboratorio di Arte Contemporanea, Università della Sapienza di Roma, Rome (2006);
- Unheard of music. Listen with your eyes, Accademia Chigiana - S.Maria della Scala, Siena (2002);
- Augenmusik - Music for the eyes, Music Biennale - Berlin (2001);
- Virtual Music, IIC Spazio Italia, Los Angeles (2000);
- Labirinti, Museo Pecci, Prato (1998);
- Babele, Museo Fabroni, Pistoia (1998);
- Virtual Music, Fondazione Mudima, Milan (1997);
- Heard seeing, Centro delle Arti Zamalek, Il Cairo (1996);
- Heard seeing, Hotel de Galiffet, Istituto Italiano di Cultura, Paris (1993); Daniele Lombardi, I.C.A. Institut of Contemporary Arts, London (1992);
- Atalanta Fugiens, Galleria Carini, Florence (1992);
- For eyes and ears, Studio Morra, Naples (1991);
- La metafora dello spazio, Repubblica di San Marino (1986);
- The Noise of Time, Palazzo Novellucci, Prato (1983).

== Essential Discography ==
- Suono Segno Gesto Visione a Firenze 2 / P.Grossi, G.Chiari, G.Cardini, A.Mayr, D.Lombardi, M.Aitiani, S.Maltagliati (Atopos music-2008);
- Musica Futurista Daniele Lombardi - pianoforte - (Remastering 2 LP 33 Cramps Records Collana Multhipla 1980);
- Futurpiano Daniele Lombardi - pianoforte - Music by Artur Vincent Lourié, Leo Ornstein, George Antheil (2009);
- Russian Futurism: Alexander Mossolov-Sonata nr. 4 Op. 11-Turkmenian Nights-Sonata nr. 5 Op. 12 (reprint Arte Nova) ANO 277930(2009);
- Toccata for Player Piano by Daniele Lombardi - Player Piano 6-Dabringhus und Grimm Musicproduction-MDG 645 1406-2 (2008);
- Arthur Vincent Louriè - early piano music - Daniele Lombardi - pianoforte - Col Legno WWE 20071, (2002);
