= Giuseppe Chiari =

Giuseppe Chiari may refer to:

- Giuseppe Chiari (artist-composer-philosopher) (1926–2007), Italian artist, composer, and philosopher
- Giuseppe Bartolomeo Chiari (1654–1727), Italian painter
