= Andrea Portera =

Italian composer of contemporary music

Andrea Portera is an Italian composer of contemporary music.

== Biography ==
Andrea Portera studied at Conservatorio Luigi Cherubini in Florence, following the composition course with Salvatore Sciarrino at the same time. He studied at School of music in Fiesole (Florence) with Kamran Khacheh and perfectioned himself with Giacomo Manoni. He won many composition contests. He was also at international contests: for example the International pianistic contest "Camillo Togni", the Gian Battista Viotti contest, the Franco Evangelisti contest, the Castello di Belveglio contest, the Dino Ciani and the Valentino Bucchi prize that won for him a silver medal from the President of Italian Republic Carlo Azeglio Ciampi.

His works have been played by the Tokyo Philharmonic Orchestra, the Symphonic Orchestra of the Slovak Radio, the National Orchestra of Estonia, the Orchestra of Colours of Athens, the SPCO Chamber Orchestra of Minnesota, the Dedalo Ensemble, the Quartetto Accademia, the Gaudeamus Ensemble.

He taught at faculty of Architecture of University of Genoa about Music Projects. He is supervisor of musical scores and coordinator of music graphic for the magazine "Chitarre e Percussioni". He authored books with Le Monnier and Mondadori. He presently teaches music analysis, complementary harmony, and musical video composition at the School of Music of Fiesole.

He has worked also in the theatre with different authors, actors, choreographers, like Stefano Massini, Sandro Lombardo, Michele Placido, Ottavia Piccolo, Milena Vukotic and Keith Ferrone. Portera has many works in his catalogue, many live recordings with different orchestras and some works recorded in studios and released with different labels. For the independent label Miraloop were released.

== Discography ==
- 2004 – Studio Etereo with Raffaele Sargenti at guitar.
- 2004 – Spettri Crisalidei, recorded at the Accademia Nazionale di Santa Cecilia in Rome
- 2005 – Amorte, recorded in Florence
- 2006 – Cube, considered his masterpiece. It consists in six tracks representing both six cube's face and the six human life's periods : the titles of the tracks are: "Birth", "Childhood", "Adolescence", "Adult Age", "Senility" and "Death". These tracks were recorded at Tokyo Opera city hall with the Tokyo Philharmonic Orchestra and won second prize at the Toru Takemitsu contest.

== See also ==
- Electronic music
- Acousmatic music
- Albert Mayr
