= Francesco Filidei =

Italian concert organist and composer

- Born: 1973 (age 52–53); Pisa, Italy
- Education: Conservatorio Luigi Cherubini; Conservatoire de Paris
- Occupations: Organist; Composer

Francesco Filidei (born 1973) is an Italian concert organist and composer. He has performed internationally. As a composer, he has collaborated with singer-songwriter Claire Diterzi and written operas premiered in Porto and Paris. His music has been performed by notable contemporary music ensembles. His Japanese wife, Noriko Baba, is also a composer.

== Life ==
Filidei graduated from the Conservatorio Luigi Cherubini in Florence, where he won unanimously the first prizes in organ playing and music composition. He followed advanced courses of Salvatore Sciarrino, Giacomo Manzoni, Sylvano Bussotti, and studied further with Jean Guillou in Zürich. From 1999 to 2005, he studied at the Conservatoire de Paris with Frédéric Durieux and Michaël Lévinas, among others. He graduated in composition with honours. At the same time, he took a composition course of the IRCAM.

He performs in concert, playing works by Franz Liszt, César Franck, as well as his own compositions and much contemporary music for organ and piano, in Italy and abroad. In 1998, he was awarded the S. Taddei Annual Scholarship and in 2004 the Meyer Prize and in 2007 the Takefu International Composition Award.

In his compositions, Filidei tries – as Sciarrino says – "to imagine a music that has lost the sound element". His works are performed by notable contemporary music ensembles, such as the Ensemble 2e2m, the Ensemble InterContemporain, Les Percussions de Strasbourg, Alter ego, L'Instant donné, the Nouvel Ensemble Moderne, the Ensemble orchestral contemporain and were recorded by Radio France and Rai Tre.

He received the Musikpreis from the city of Salzburg, was composer in residence at the Akademie Schloss Solitude in Stuttgart in 2006 and was invited to the Casa de Velázquez in Madrid in 2007.

He worked with the singer-songwriter Claire Diterzi for the musical and theatrical show L'Arbre en poche presented in 2019.

His opera Giordano Bruno had its world premiere in 2015 in Porto. The world premiere of his opera L'inondation (The Flood) was given on 27 September 2019 at the Opéra-Comique in Paris. The libretto by Joël Pommerat is based on the eponymous short story by Yevgeny Zamyatin published in 1929.

In 2023 Teatro alla Scala and the Opéra de Paris jointly commissioned Filidei to create a new opera Il Nome Della Rosa based on the book by Umberto Eco.
