= Sylvano Bussotti =

Italian composer (1931–2021)

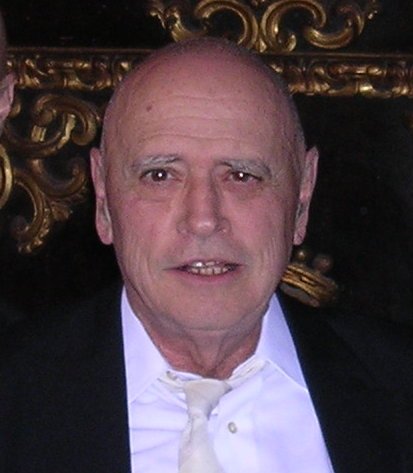
- Bussotti in 2006
- Born: 1 October 1931; Florence, Italy
- Died: 19 September 2021 (aged 89); Milan, Italy
- Education: Florence Conservatory
- Occupations: Composer, painter, designer
- Organizations: La Fenice; Puccini Festival; Venice Biennale; Fiesole School of Music
- Spouse: Rocco Quaglia
- Awards: ISCM Prize

Sylvano Bussotti (1 October 1931 – 19 September 2021) was an Italian composer of contemporary classical music and also a painter, set and costume designer, opera director and manager, and writer and professor. His compositions employ graphic notation, which has often created special problems of interpretation. He was known as a composer for the stage. His first opera was La Passion selon Sade, which premiered in Palermo in 1965. Later Bussotti operas and ballets were premiered at the Teatro Comunale di Firenze, Teatro Lirico di Milano, Teatro Regio di Torino, and Piccola Scala di Milano, among other venued. He was artistic director of La Fenice in Venice, the Puccini Festival, and the music section of the Venice Biennale. He taught internationally, for a decade at the Fiesole School of Music. He is regarded as a leading composer of Italy's avantgarde, and a having been a Renaissance man with many talents who combined the arts expressively.

== Life and career ==
Born in Florence, Bussotti learned to play the violin beginning before the age of five with Margherita Castellani, becoming a prodigy. He was also introduced to painting, by his uncle Tono Zancanaro and his older brother Renzo. At the Florence Conservatory, he studied harmony and counterpoint with Roberto Lupi, and piano with Luigi Dallapiccola, but achieved no diploma due to World War II. He kept studying composition on his own. From 1956, he studied privately in Paris with Max Deutsch, and met Luigi Nono, Pierre Boulez and Heinz-Klaus Metzger who introduced him to the Darmstädter Ferienkurse. His first composition performed in public was Breve, played by Françoise Deslogères at a gallery in Düsseldorf in 1958, with John Cage in the audience. In Paris, Cathy Berberian sang his works, conducted by Pierre Boulez. Bussotti travelled to the U.S. in 1964 and 1965, visiting Buffalo and New York City invited by the Rockefeller Foundation. In 1972, he visited Berlin, invited by German Academic Exchange Service (DAAD) for the Ford Foundation.

As a composer he was influenced by the twelve-tone music of Anton Webern and later John Cage. Examples of his use of graphic notation in his pieces, often reflecting his personal life, included La Passion selon Sade and Lorenzaccio. He was a composer of the Florentine artistic current, that has been active since the end of World War II up to the present, including Giuseppe Chiari, Giancarlo Cardini, Albert Mayr, Marcello Aitiani, Sergio Maltagliati, Daniele Lombardi, and Pietro Grossi. These musicians experimented with the interaction between sound, sign, and vision, a synaesthetics of art derived from historical avant-gardes, from Kandinsky to futurism, to Scriabin and Schoenberg, all the way to Bauhaus.

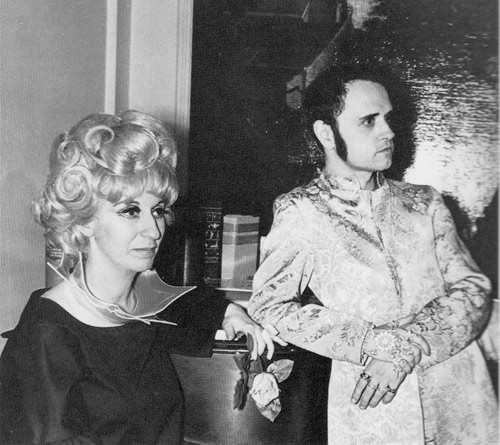
Cathy Berberian and Bussotti

Bussotti also pursued other disciplines including painting, graphic art, and journalism. He was a well-known film director, actor, and singer. He wrote most of the librettos for his operas. As a writer, his style was considered one of the most refined among the Italian poets and novelists of the 20th century. French culture fascinated him since he was a boy. His great friend Cathy Berberian (Luciano Berio's wife) was one of his most famous interpreters. He was well acquainted with writers and film directors Aldo Palazzeschi, Pier Paolo Pasolini, Derek Jarman, Elsa Morante, Alberto Moravia, Aldo Braibanti, Mario Zanzotto, Fabio Casadei Turroni, Dacia Maraini, and Umberto Eco. Jarman was the director of his opera L'Ispirazione, first staged in Florence in 1988. Rara Film is his most celebrated underground film. The silent film, according to the author's instructions, should be performed, together with the score, played by seven to eleven players. The music of Rara Film is not a strict counterpoint of the film, flowing without any relation to the images.

Bussotti was the stage director of Mussorgsky's The Fair at Sorochyntsi for La Scala in Milan in 1981, followed two years later by Puccini's Il trittico, a televised production for which he designed the set of Gianni Schicchi. He served as the artistic director of La Fenice in Venice, directed the Puccini Festival in Torre del Lago,, and was director of opera at La Scala. He was head of the music section of the Venice Biennale from 1987. He taught composition, analysis and the history of musical theatre at the Academy of Fine Arts in L'Aquila, at the Internationale Bachakademie Stuttgart in Stuttgart, at the Royan Festival, and from 1980 to 1991 at the Fiesole School of Music. As a personality, he was notoriously flamboyant and occasionally shocking. Openly gay, Bussotti expressed his sexuality in his music as early as 1958, when it was socially dangerous to do so. His partner and spouse was Rocco Quaglia, a ballet dancer and choreographer with whom he collaborated on many projects.

Bussotti died at a nursing home in Milan fôllowing a long illness on 19 September 2021, twelve days before his 90th birthday. Festivities planned in Florence for the event are held in his memory, titled 90 Bussotti, from 20 to 25 September, including performances by Fabbrica Europa, Florence Queer Festival, Fondazione Culturale Stensen, Maschietto Editore, and Tempo Reale, collaborating with Maggio Musicale Fiorentino, Bussotti Opera Ballet, and the Museo Marino Marini. In Germany, from 29 September to 1 October, a scientific conference was held on Bussotti's work, in the course of which the Ensemble E-MEX played two commemorative concerts. This included the first complete performance of Bussotti's "Piêces de Chair II" (1960), sung, among others, by soprano Monica Benvenuti, who had long been closely associated with the composer.

== Awards ==
Bussotti was awarded the ISCM Prize from the International Society for Contemporary Music in 1961, 1963 and 1965, then in 1967 the All'Amelia Prize at the Venice Biennale, in 1974 the Toscani d'Oggi Prize, and in 1979 the Psacaropulo Prize.

== Works ==
=== Music ===
Most of Bussotti's works were published by Casa Ricordi:

=== Stage works ===
- La Passion selon Sade (mistero da camera), The Passion after Sade (chamber mystery) 1965
- Lorenzaccio, premiered at La Fenice in 1972
- Bergkristall (balletto, 1973)
- Nottetempo (dramma lirico), 1976 with Oslavio Di Credico at the Teatro Lirico di Milano
- Oggetto amato, ballet in one act (1976), at the Teatro Lirico di Milano with Cathy Berberian and Claudio Desderi
- La rarità. Potente. premiered at the Teatro Regio di Torino in 1979
- Le Racine (Pianobar pour Phèdre), chamber opera in a prologue, three acts and an intermezzo for voices, premiered at Piccola Scala in Milan in 1980
- Fedra, tragedia lirica, 1988
- L'ispirazione, melodramma in three acts, 1988
- Silvano Sylvano. Rappresentazione della vita, chamber opera in one tempo on words (testi) di Sylvano Bussotti (2002–2007)

=== Other compositions ===
- Due Voci, for soprano, Martenot waves, and orchestra (text: La Fontaine (1958))
- Sette Fogli, for various solo and group ensembles (1959) (Note: Recording at the London Music Digest, Roundhouse London, 1970s, The London Music Digest at Discogs; Sylvano Bussotti: Per tre sul piano (audio) on YouTube, Roger Woodward)
- Piêces de Chair II, for piano, baritone, female voice and instruments (1960)
- Pour Clavier (1961) (Note: Recording at the London Music Digest, Roundhouse London, 1970s; Sylvano Bussotti: Pour Clavier (audio) on YouTube, Roger Woodward)
- Memories, 5 scenes for mixed choir, soloists and orchestra (texts: Braibanti, Pasolini e.a. (1962))
- La Passion selon Sade, chamber mystery play for voice, mime, actors and instruments (1965)
- Marbre, for 11 strings and spinet (1967)
- Rara Requiem, for soprano, mezzo, tenor, baritone, mixed vocal sextet, choir and instrumental ensemble (1970)
- I Semi di Gramsci, symphonic poem for string quartet and orchestra (1971) Score: Ricordi. World premiere: 22 April 1972 (Quartetto Italiano, ?, ?) dedicated to the Quartetto Italiano
- Sadun, for 12-part choir (1975)
- Amato object ('Bussottioperaballet' (1976))
- Raragramma, for orchestra and violin and flute obbligato. (1980) I. Raragramma; II. L'enfant prodige; III. Paganini; IV. Calando symphony. Score: Ricordi. World premiere: 20 October 1979 (Fabbriciani, SWF Sinfonieorchester, Bour) second part of the cycle "Il catalogo e questo"; dedicated to Romano, Rocco and Luigi Pestalozza and Francesco Degrada
- Modello, for violin and orchestra. (1998) World premiere: xx.04.2000 (Agazzini, ?, Tamayo) dedicated to S. Rocco

=== Novels and poems ===
Bussotti's writings included:

- I miei teatri, Il Novecento edition, Palermo, 1982.
- Letterati Ignoranti, poesie per musica, Quaderni di Barbablù, Siena, 1986.
- Sylvano Bussotti, nudi ritratti e disegnini, sketches with poems by Romani Brizzi, Trucchi e Bussotti, Il polittico edition, Rome, 1991.
- Non fare il minimo rumore, Girasole Edition, Ravenna, 1997.
- Disordine alfabetico, Spirali Edition, Milan, 2002.
- La calligrafia di un romanzo uno e due, novel in Peccati veniali, a cura di A. Veneziani, Coniglio editore, Rome, 2004.
- L'acuto, in Angelo d'Edimburgo by Fabio Casadei Turroni, Le Mondine Edition, Molinella, 2006.
- I Mozart vanno vanno, interludio in La notte delle dissonanze, by Sandro Cappelletto, EDT, Turin, 2007.

== Discography ==
- Suono, segno, gesto visione a Firenze (Sound, sign, gesture, vision in Florence)
  - (CD 1): Sylvano Bussotti, Giancarlo Cardini, Giuseppe Chiari, Daniele Lombardi
  - (CD 2): Pietro Grossi, Giuseppe Chiari, Giancarlo Cardini, Albert Mayr, Daniele Lombardi, Marcello Aitiani, Sergio Maltagliati (Atopos music 1999-2008).
    The path of more than fifty years of musical culture in Florence, since the end of the Second World War, is documented in these two audio CDs. This audio recording contains the meeting of composers and pianists who are the protagonists of the Music of Art in Florence, a significant phenomenon in the history of the second half of the twentieth century.

== Notes and references ==
Notes
