= Vito Frazzi =

Italian neo-Romantic composer (1888-1975)

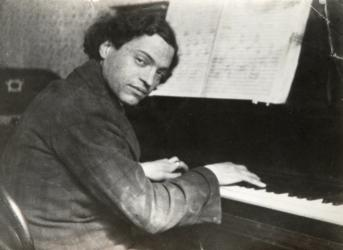
- Born: 1 August 1888; San Secondo Parmense, Italy
- Died: 7 July 1975 (aged 86); Florence, Italy
- Occupation: Composer

Vito Frazzi (1 August 1888 – 7 July 1975) was an Italian neo-romantic composer. He was born in San Secondo Parmense, and studied at the Parma Conservatory, where he learnt composition from Guido Alberto Fano. From 1912 to 1958 he taught piano, harmony, counterpoint and composition at the Florence Conservatory; there he came into contact with Ildebrando Pizzetti, the conservatory's director from 1917 to 1923, who influenced Frazzi's compositional style. Frazzi also taught at the Accademia Musicale Chigiana from 1936 to 1963. His students included Bruno Bartolozzi, Bruno Bettinelli, Valentino Bucchi, Luigi Dallapiccola and Angelo Francesco Lavagnino.

He died in Florence on 7 July 1975.

== Works ==
Frazzi composed symphonic, choral and chamber music, and a number of operas. Re Lear was written between 1922 and 1928, but not performed until 1939; it is loosely based on Shakespeare's King Lear. Don Chisciotte, to Frazzi's own libretto derived from the Don Quijote of Cervantes and the Vida de Don Quijote y Sancho of Miguel de Unamuno, was composed between 1940 and 1950 and received its première at the Teatro Comunale of Florence on 28 April 1952. It consists of six scenes which may be performed either separately or together; a supplement to it, Le nozze di Camaccio ("the marriage of Camaccio"), though published, has apparently not been performed. Frazzi destroyed the score of his opera L’ottava moglie di Barbablù ("Bluebeard's eighth wife") after its première at the Teatro della Pergola in Florence in January 1940; the work is unpublished.

Frazzi's compositional style is characterised by extensive use of the octatonic scale of alternating tones and semitones. He was among the first to explore the theory of this scale, and his Scale alternate, "alternating scales", may be the earliest published work on the topic (an unpublished treatise by Edmond de Polignac dates from about 1879). His I vari sistemi del linguaggio musicale, "the various systems of musical language", treats of the same subject.

== Publications ==
- Scale alternate Florence: Forlivesi, 1930
- I vari sistemi del linguaggio musicale Siena: Accademia Musicale Chigiana, 1960
