= La Passion selon Sade =

1965 opera by Sylvano Bussotti

- Opera by Sylvano Bussotti
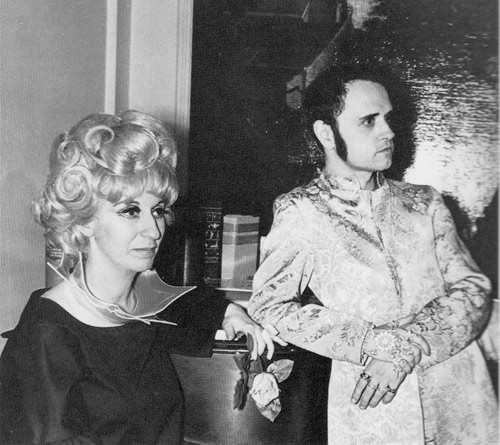
- Cathy Berberian, the vocal soloist, and Bussotti
- Translation: Passion, according to Sade
- Librettist: Sylvano Bussotti
- Language: Italian
- Based on: Marquis de Sade's novels Justine and Juliette
- Premiere: 5 September 1965; Teatro Biondo, Palermo

La Passion selon Sade (The Passion according to Sade) is an opera by Sylvano Bussotti who also wrote the libretto, and was the set designer and director. The subtitle is "mistero da camera", describing it as a chamber mystery play. It was Bussotti's first work for the stage. The opera premiered in 1965 in Palermo with soprano Cathy Berberian, who portrayed the titular characters from two novels by the Marquis de Sade, Justine and Juliette. It has been regarded as experimental musical theatre in several respects.

== History ==
The Italian composer Sylvano Bussotti was inspired for his stage work La Passion selon Sade by Sonnet II, a poem by Louise Labé from the 16th century, a "contemplation of love caught between the polar opposites of joy and despair" and Marquis de Sade's novels Justine and Juliette, in which "hope of a virtuous life is abandoned for the destructive pursuit of pleasure". The opera also references Bussotti's autobiography.

Bussotti planned the composition from 1964. He then met the recorder player Michael Vetter with whom he collaborated on a piece RARA, a duet for recorder and a mime which he would later include in the opera. He composed La Passion mostly in 1965, with revisions after a preview then until 1966. He subtitled it (in French) as "mystère de chambre avec Tableaux vivants précédé de Solo, avec un couple de Rara et suivi d'une autre Phrase à trois" (chamber mystery with tableaux vivants preceded by solo, with a couple of Rara and followed by another Phrase à trois).

It premiered on 5 September 1965 in a preview at Palermo's Teatro Biondo, directed by the composer in a set designed by him, with soprano Cathy Berberian and conducted by Romano Amidei. The performance was part of the festival New Music Week ("Settimane Internazionali Nuova Musica"). The title, alluding to the Passion of Jesus combined with the writer Sade, caused a scandal, and when the opera was first performed in France, on 7 December 1966 at the Odéon, it had to be changed to La Passion selon x. The first complete performance was given at the Royal Dramatic Theatre in Stockholm on 1 November 1968. It was published by Ricordi.

A revival was given in 2017 by the Théâtre Bernadette Lafont in Nîmes, directed by Antoine Gindt and conducted by Léo Warynski, with soprano Raquel Camarinha and the Ensemble Multilatérale.

== Composition ==
Bussotti scored the work for mezzo-soprano and an ensemble of nine instruments: flute, oboe, oboe d'amore, horn, percussion, two pianos (also celesta, harmonium), organ, and cello. The work is structured in scenes without a coherent narrative, with the characters and instruments expressing meanings for the viewer to interpret. The score is often in graphic notation, including visual arts, which leaves the players with some freedom to perform. The duration is about 1¼ hours. The mezzo performs the roles of both Sade protagonists, Justine and Juliette, and the instrumentalists are also expected to act and sing. RARA functions as an interlude between two action scenes. It can be played individually in concert.

The opera has been described as "perhaps the most daring, experimental and innovative of Sylvano Bussotti's compositions".
