= Sergio Maltagliati =

Italian composer and artist

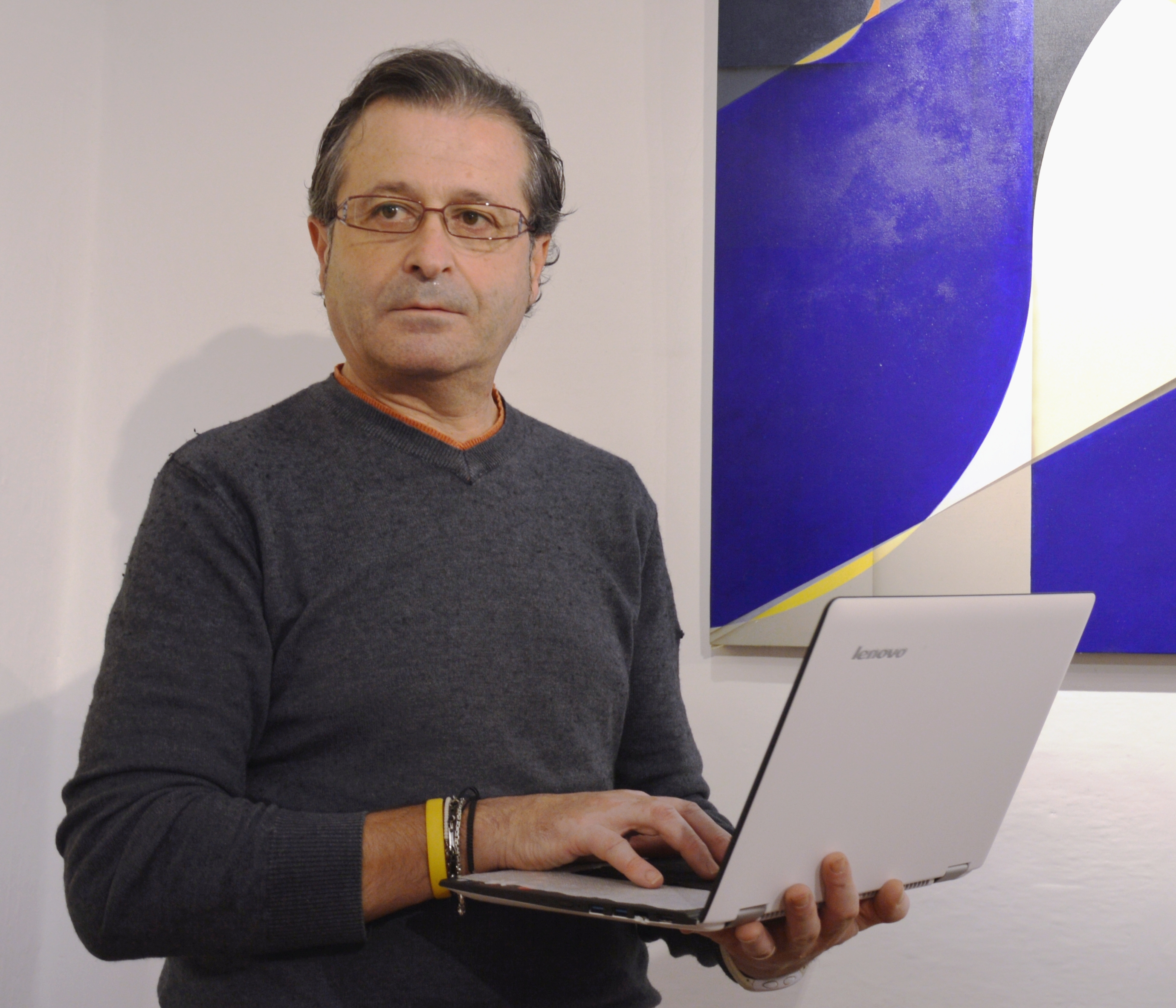
- Maltagliati in 2016
- Born: September 26, 1960; Pescia, Pistoia, Italy
- Education: Conservatorio Luigi Cherubini Florence
- Occupations: Composer, programmer, artist and computer scientist
- Years active: 1980–present
- Style: Experimental, Electronic, Computer music
- Partner(s): Pietro Grossi, Romano Rizzato
- Website: visualmusic.it

Signature
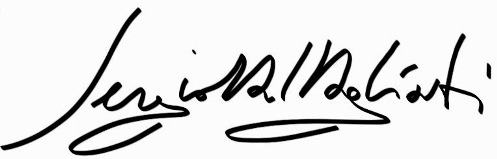

Sergio Maltagliati (born 1960 in Pescia, Italy) is an Italian Internet-based artist, composer, and visual-digital artist. His first musical experience with the Gialdino Gialdini Musical Band was in the early 70s.

== Biography ==
On 04/10/2023 he was elected Honorary Academician of the Accademia delle arti del disegno in Florence. Historical Academy founded in Florence in 1563 by Cosimo I de' Medici, Grand Duke of Tuscany at the suggestion of Giorgio Vasari, as a leading exponent of the Florentine artistic current known as Musica d'Arte (Visual Music and Fluxus).

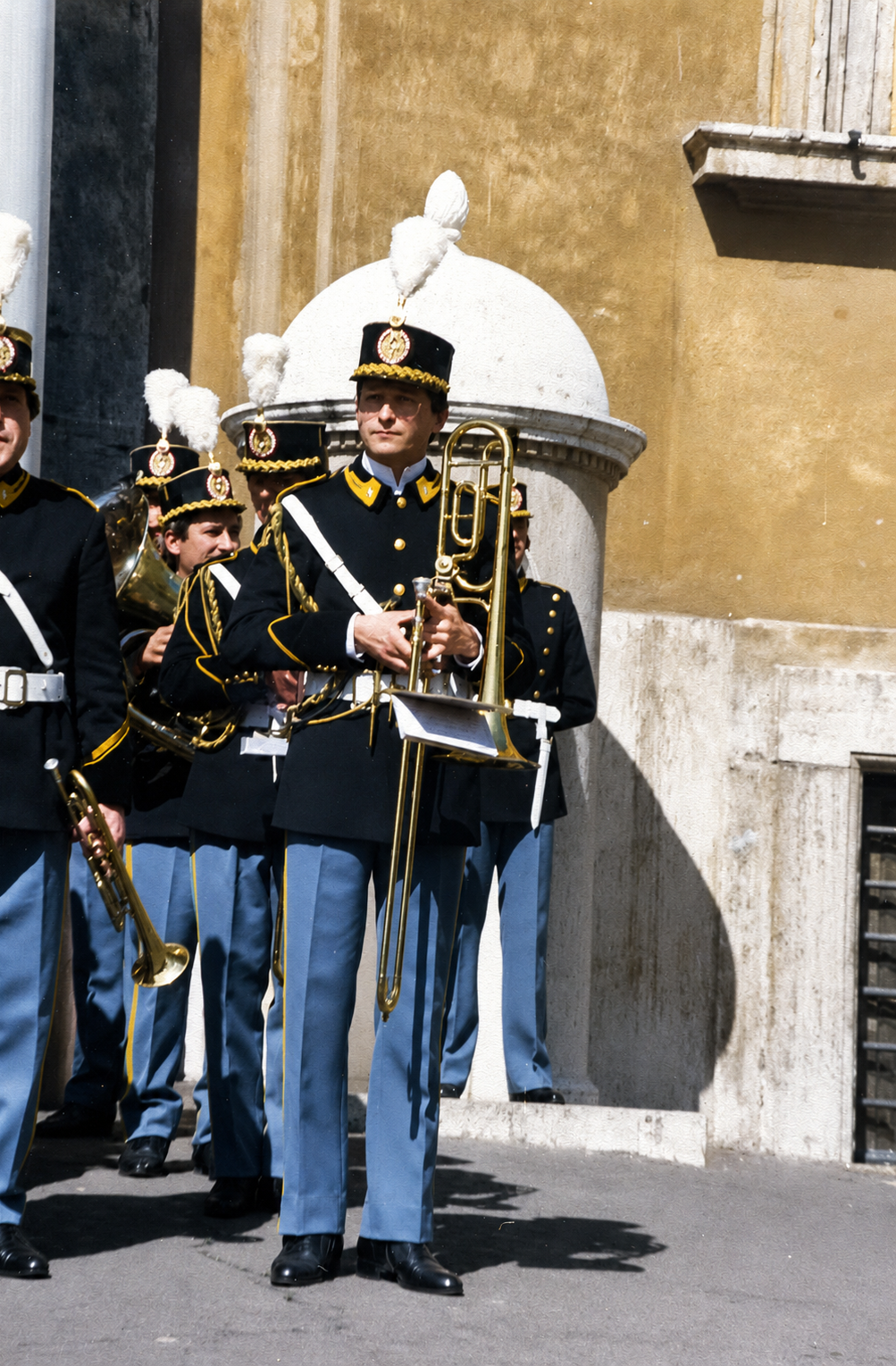
Sergio Maltagliati performing as a trombonist with the Guardia di Finanza Band at the entrance of the Quirinal Palace in Rome, Italy. Historical photograph, circa 1981.

Sergio Maltagliati an artist from Florence Italy; studied music at the Florence Conservatory, then he began to paint. Thus creating a new method of writing music where the score becomes a visual composition. The relation between the sound and color creates a living feeling that art is not dead. It does not stop at the artist's last attempt at the canvas, but goes beyond to the viewer. It is the relationship between artist and viewer, one is no different from the other. Now the viewer can take the step that the artist may dare not to across. It is the point of translation a fear to most artist that want to create and let their work go. This kind of art allows the viewer to create with the artist and create so much more. Sergio Maltagliati has always been deeply interested in a multimedia concept of art. His education, in both music and the visual arts, has placed him in the position to incorporate sign, colour, and sound into a unitary concept of multiple perception, through analogies, contrasts, stratifications, and associations.

He's a composer who joined, at the end of the eighties, the Florentine artistic current, that has been active since the end of World War II up to the present, including Sylvano Bussotti, Giuseppe Chiari, Giancarlo Cardini, Albert Mayr, Marcello Aitiani, Daniele Lombardi, Pietro Grossi. These musicians have experimented the interaction among sound, sign and vision, a synaesthetics of art derived from historical avant-gardes, from Kandinskij to futurism, to Scrjabin and Schoenberg, all the way to Bauhaus.

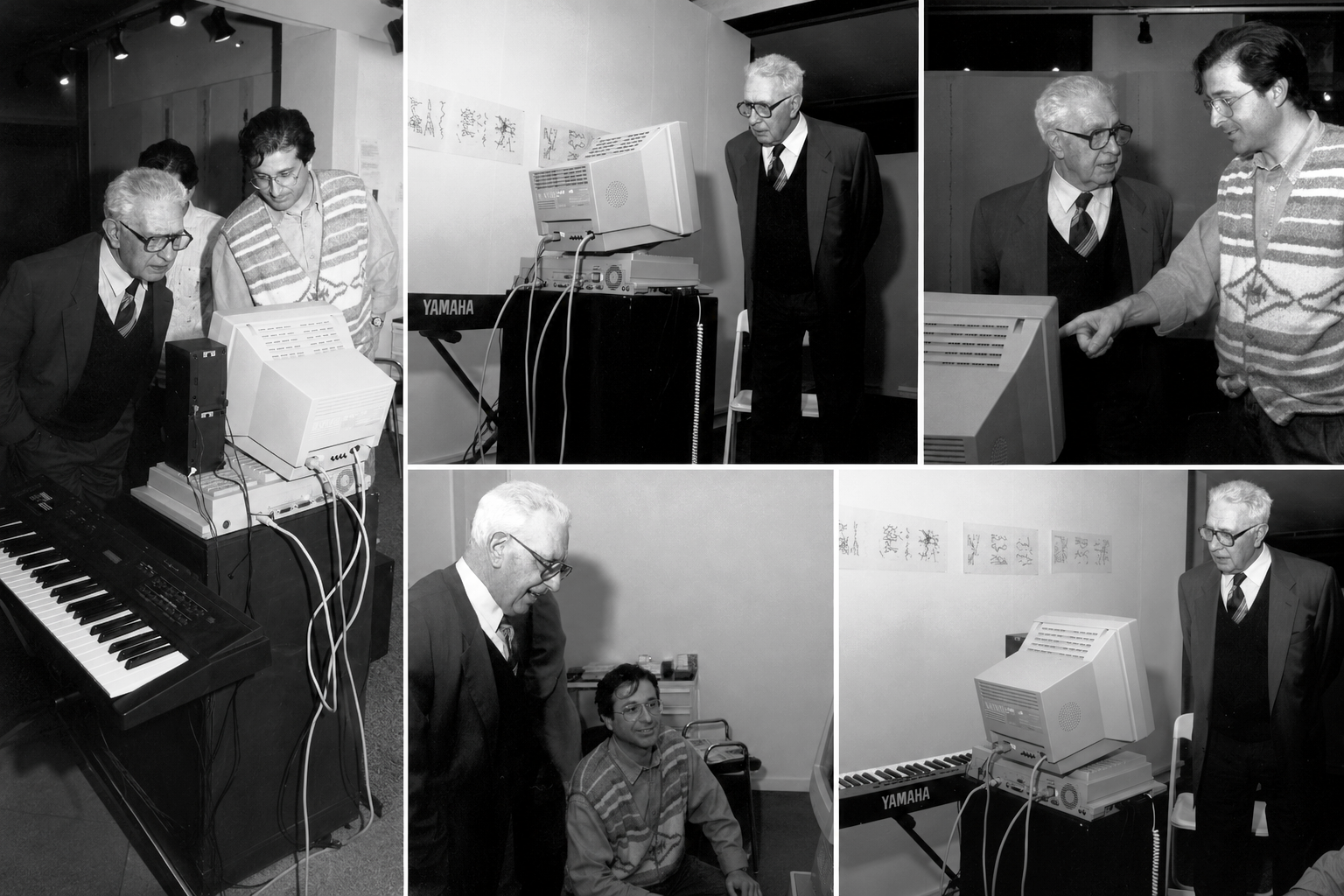
Pietro Grossi visits the exhibition of Sergio Maltagliati at Galleria Il Gabbiano in 1997 (ph. Paola Zucchello).

In 2021 the Luigi Dallapiccola Study Center made him official in the Florentine Music Archive of the 20th century, recognizing him as one of the most significant composers of the 20th century, active in Florence. In 2021, the Luigi Dallapiccola Study Center officially included him in the Archive of the Florentine Musical Twentieth Century (genealogical chart curated by musicologist Mario Ruffini), recognizing him as one of the most significant twentieth-century composers active in Florence.

His work in the eighties is also based in involving, with didactic-educational projects, students as executors of performances in the example of the Music Circus carried out in 1984 in a High School in Piemonte by John Cage. And it is the American musician (met in 1991 in Zurich for the execution of Europeras 1&2)who appreciates this aspect of Maltagliati's work, because he is able to involve young people as performers. These works, besides building approach to music and, specifically, developing a different way of listening, aim at expanding the concept of artistic creation to the executor, till it reaches just the user, often unprovided with a traditional artistic formation.

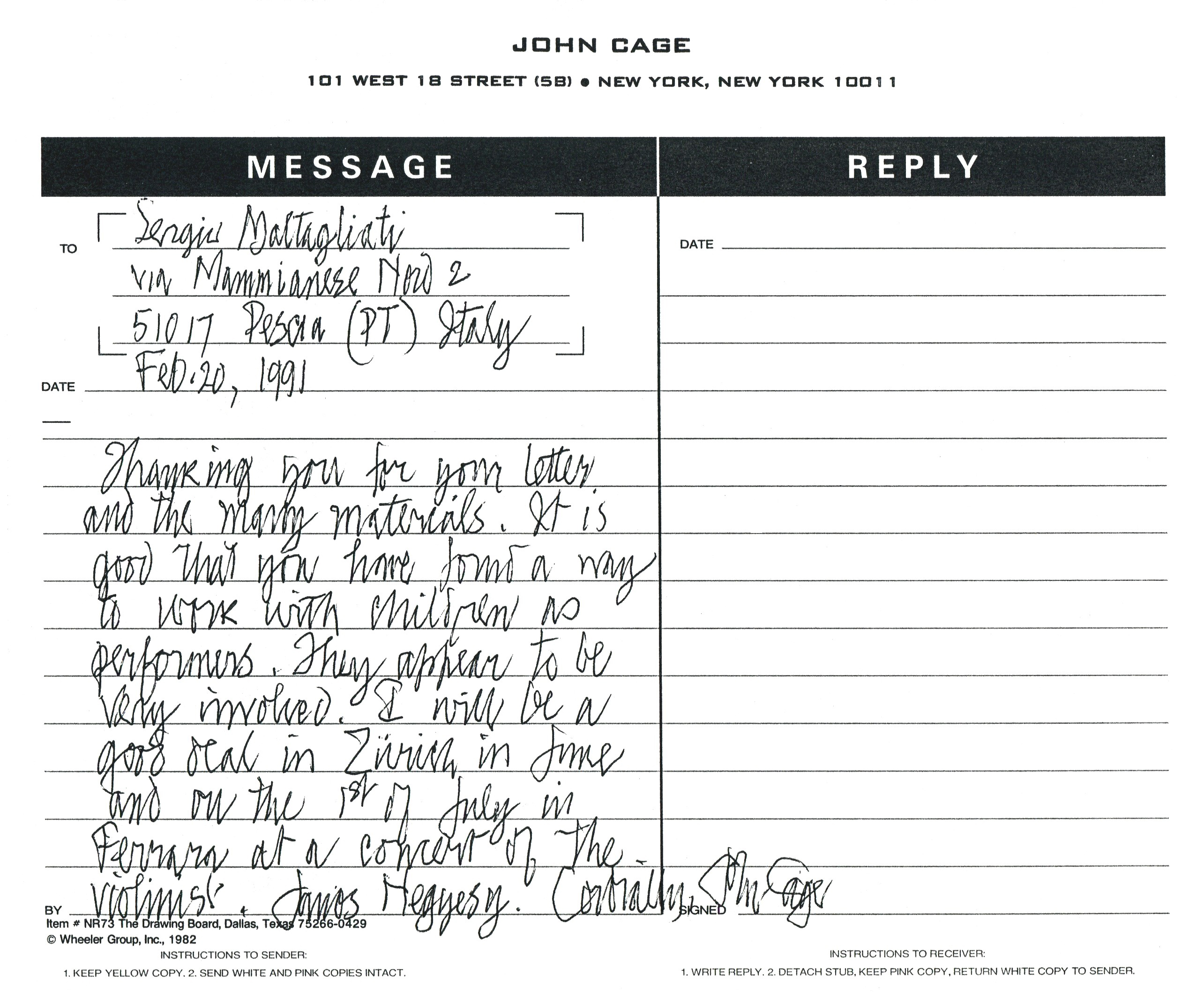
Letter written by John Cage

Since 1997, Sergio Maltagliati has dealt principally in music on the Internet and one of his first compositions intended for the network, netOper@ a new, and the first Italian interactive work for the Web starting in the spring of 1997. The interactive work will be presented simultaneously in real and cyberspace. The Opera is realized with the collaboration of Pietro Grossi, the legendary father of Italian music informatics. The essential aspect to Sergio Maltagliati's approach is the idea that art is not just the fruit of the composer, the creation is always the fruit of collaboration. Two of his works are strongly based on this concept: neXtOper@_1.03 (2001) a work for mobile phones, and midi_Visu@lMusiC (2005) music and images on I-Mode mobile phone. In 1999, he writes the program autom@tedVisualMusiC, software from experiences of the visual HomeArt programs designed by Grossi in the '80s, written in the language BBC BASIC with computer Acorn Archimedes A310, a project that creates abstract designs and sound by using programming to make the piece interactive and adds movement. This artwork not only has visually pieces, but also is interactive. In 2001, he has participated in the project Interview yourself by Amy Alexander .

In 2023 he was selected for the first international Virtual Exhibition on the island of Venice Viral Human' / 'Public Art and the Metaverse. By means of a specially created App, it is possible to move virtually among the palaces and squares of Venice, where one can see or hear an inspired work, linked to the location. Scala Contarini del Bovolo, is a 15th-century palace with a spiral staircase of steps that winds around the outside of the palace. The spiral of the chicciola evokes the golden spiral; many 20th-century composers chose it as a model for their music.

He currently uses a personal computer to set up interactive sound and graphics works, open compositions where the listener has a predominant and decisive role.

== More significant works ==
Since the end of the 1970s, his catalog includes instrumental compositions, performances, together with paintings, digital and interactive graphic and musical works which are often the result (given his double formation of musical and visual studies) of conversion into images and vice versa of a precise musical thought, transposed in an innovative musical writing.

=== Instrumental compositions ===
- 1980 Fogli di Diario lyric for mezzo-soprano-flute and piano (first performance – Belveglio Asti 1980).
- 1983 Iridem for trombone and clarinet.
- 1984 Inciclo for trombone solo.
- 1987 La Luce dell'Asia for white voices choir.
- 1980/89 Sintassi in Rosso e Nero for voice and piano (first performance -Villa Martini Monsummano Terme 1989).
- 1991 Sinfonia (first performance 1991).
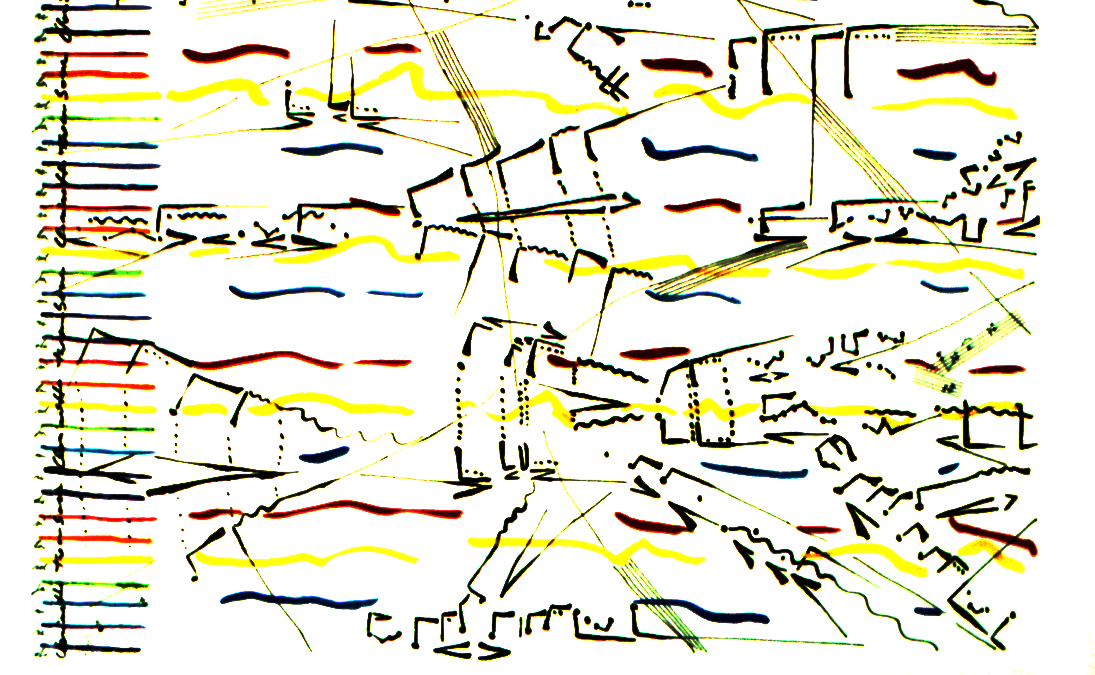
  Iridem 2 for clarinet and trombone (1991)
- 1991 Iridem 2 for clarinet and trombone.
- 1993 Aria48 for canto and orchestra.

=== Computer Visu@lMusiC ===
autom@tedVisualMusiC Goldberg Variations (screenshot)

autom@tedVisualMusic, generative visual music software, creates images and sounds in relation to precise correspondences sound-symbol-color, producing multiple variations.

- 1999 Circus 5.05 (from original BBC Basic graphics software, music software autom@tedMusic 1.01).
- 2001 Net Surfing 3.0 (icons, and casual sounds from the Web, arranged and reorganized with reference to precise correspondences among sound/colour/image).
- autom@ted MusiC 1.02
- Sound Life 3.01 (computer music transcription by Pietro Grossi-Soft TAUMUS synthesizer TAU2, IBM System/370 Model 168, Institutes of CNR CNUCE and IEI Pisa, Italy 1980)
- 2002/2003 PIxeLs
- Oper@pixel (the traditional Lyric Opera, an unusual presence in its new digital guise).This project which generates continually diverse audiovisual compositions utilizing images and sound frequencies borrowed from the universe of cell phones, chat rooms and e-mail. And also logos, ringtones, banners and small designs in ASCII code.
- 2003 Goldberg Variations (music by Johann Sebastian Bach).
- 2005 MIDI_Visu@lMusiC (from music software Steinberg Cubase on Atari Mega STE free download Music/Ringtones). An example of artistic-creative use of Cubase midi software on the Atari Mega STE platform. The image is drawn directly in the Key window of the software, on a large virtual musical keyboard. Research began in the early nineties, and all the work is anthologically documented in an exhibition entitled Scores for floppy disck in 1997 at the Il Gabbiano Gallery in La Spezia. The catalog published by the City of La Spezia-Department of Culture contains an introductory text by the musicologist Renzo Cresti and theoretical writings by the author. In 2005 the MIDI_Visu@lMusiC project was re-proposed for the i-mode mobile phone.
- 2008 Circus 8 (1986/2008) consists of eight pieces and is based on Pietro Grossi's HomeArt programs, which automatically generated sound. Maltagliati has expanded Grossi's principle with software programs and added visual graphic variations. The visual data generated by the computer approximates the graphic score for a sound composition.

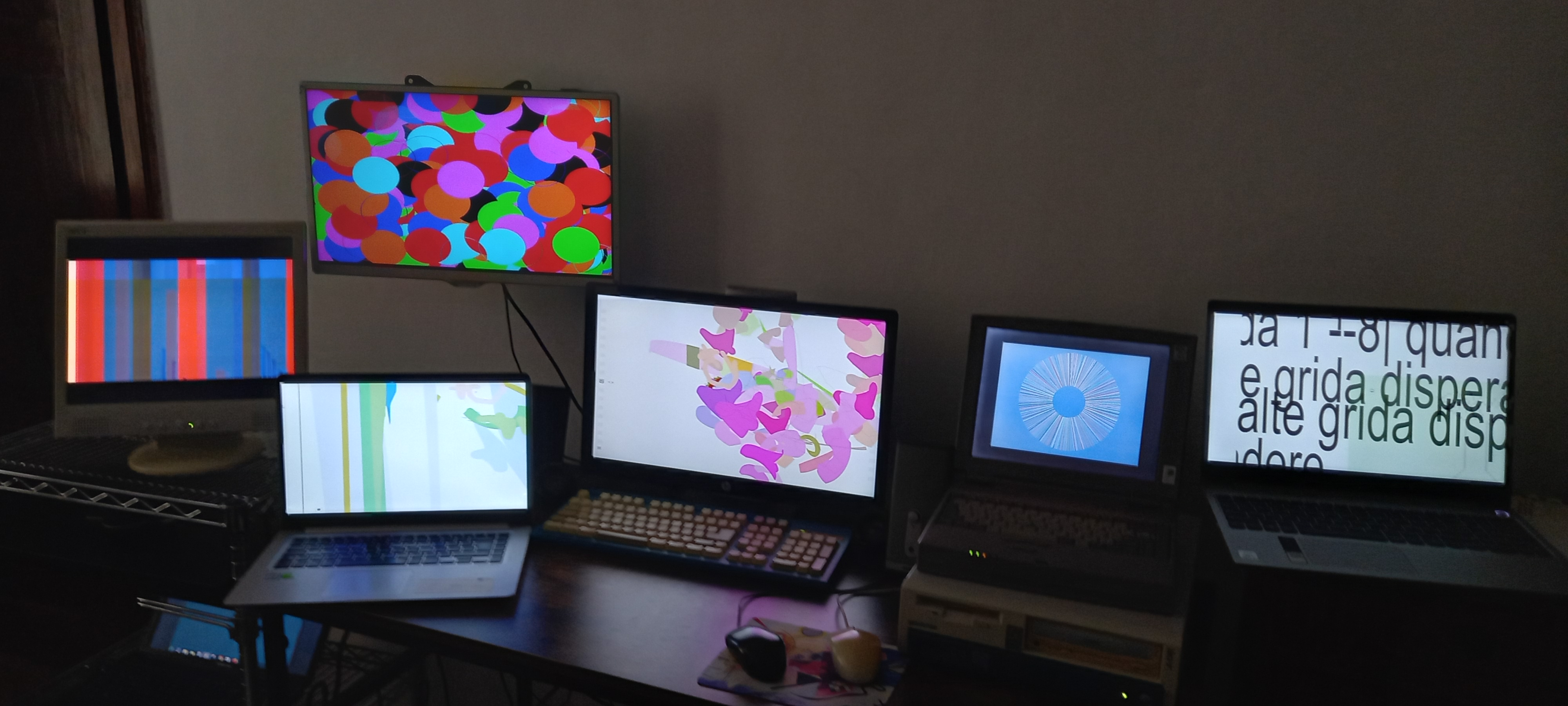
Sergio Maltagliati’s studio with computers programmed to create endlessly evolving images and sounds. From his early interactive online software involving users directly, to his most recent works developed with the help of Artificial Intelligence.

- 2012 autom@tedVisuaL, is a software which generates always different graphical variations. It is based on HomeArt's Q.Basic source code. These graphics are going to be sampled into the HomeBooks (also available as e-books), a unique kind of book, which Pietro Grossi planned in 1991. This first release autom@tedVisuaL 1.0 has produced 45 graphical single samples, which have been sampled and published.
- 2014 autom@tedMusiC 2.0, generative music software. This program can be configured to create music in many different styles and it will generate a new and original composition each time play is clicked.
- 2019 Battimenti, autom@tedMusiC 2.5. Beat(acoustics)-musical score of the painter Romano Rizzato, with frequencies of the original waves by Pietro Grossi. In this project Rizzato realizes a graphic work, inspired by his Optical art-Kinetic art period of the 60s-70s, but conceived with the sole purpose of being able to be read as a musical score. Maltagliati uses 11 sound frequencies, from 395 to 405 (the same sound events recorded by Grossi at the Studio di Fonologia in Florence in 1965) combined as suggested by the calligraphy of the score of Rizzato. The sound material is then modified by the software autom@tedMusiC Generative music (version 2.5) which generates a fully automatic music that is always different.
- 2023 Color Variations by the graphic programmes of HomeArt by Pietro Grossi. (Winner of the Lorenzo il Magnifico International Award for Performance Art at the XIV Florence Biennale 2023).
- 2025 Circus_8_8 The project Circus_8_8 uses a graphic program originally developed for HomeArt, one of the experimental platforms created by Pietro Grossi, a pioneer of Italian electronic art and generative music.

Later, through the integration of the software autom@tedVisualMusiC 5.0, interactive features were introduced: each user can draw directly on the screen and generate unique and unrepeatable visual and sound compositions, which can be saved on a computer, tablet, or smartphone. This experience combines Generative art, Artificial intelligence, and active user participation, effectively realizing Grossi’s early vision of using the computer as a creative artistic tool.

- 2026 Agenda Perenne, an intermedial and generative art project based on an automated system for the daily production of images and texts, in dialogue with practices of automatic composition and indeterminacy associated with the research of Pietro Grossi and John Cage.

== Performance ==
- 1985 Musica intorno alla Gabbia (Music around the Cage- homage to John Cage) for music, art of mime and zoo-anthropomorphous pictures with 170 performers-actors (first performance Ospedale degli Innocenti Florence 1985). In the structure of the work, the traditional role between audience and stage has been reversed on purpose. The interpreters have occupied, geometrically, the vast space of the room putting the public first on the stage and causing them, then, to move around the sound and visual groups. The musical part is based on the interdisciplinary value of music, inspired by John Cage's research on the principle of capturing and controlling the noises as musical elements. The choreographic and scenic part of the work, made by painter Edoardo Salvi was an uninterrupted dynamism of forms and spatial situations, connecting image to signs and sound.
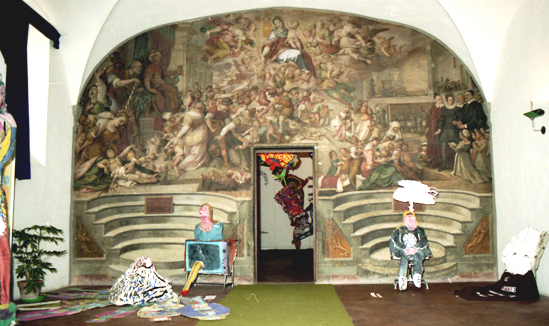
  Music around the Cage Innocenti Hospital -scenography-(Florence 1985).
- 1989 Revolution The visual part of the work is composed of a big painting, of about three hundred square metres, on which two hundred high school students have worked. The painting, divided into sixteen big strips, came together slowly, in synchronization with the music during the performance. The musical part assembled four different sound situations: instrumental music, words, sounds and noises.
- 1990/91 K.1-626M. for chorus, orchestra, magnetic tape, and objects (first performance Manzoni Theatre Pistoia Italy 1990). Mozart's works are transformed into words, sounds, noises and colors. It is the Requiem, unfinished and cataloged at number 626, which becomes a graphic visual elaboration, then fragmented and reassembled into 626 pictorial visual works, like the total of works written by Mozart.
- 1993 12 free improvisations with stones and branches of river (first performance – Villa Martini Monsummano Terme Italy 1993).
- Alla ricerca dei Silenzi perduti for 10 magnetic tapes, 7/10 audio tape with 10 performers.
- 1997 netOper@ an Italian opera with an international cast of performers on the Net, authors and performers of the work more than thirty (net)artists, among others John Dunn, Pietro Grossi and Caterina Davinio.
- Variazione Cromatica cinque2 for instruments and Magnetic tape.
- Invenzioni Cromatiche 16/44 graphic work music of 100 children on musical stroke of 16/4.
- 2001 neXtOper@ for cell.phones, interactive/collaborative work through Internet and GSM networks (cellular phones) with an educational project involving the children of Middle State School "Giusti-Gramsci" Monsummano Terme Italy.
- 2019 Alla ricerca dei Silenzi perduti 2 for flute chorus and sounds of nature, is a performance involving two hundred young performers. During the happening, the music that orbits around a traditional tonal system, comes out of its designated place: the concert hall, thus becoming only a component of a larger universe (landscape) of sound.
- 2023 Color Variations Installazione e live performance, XIV Florence Biennale.
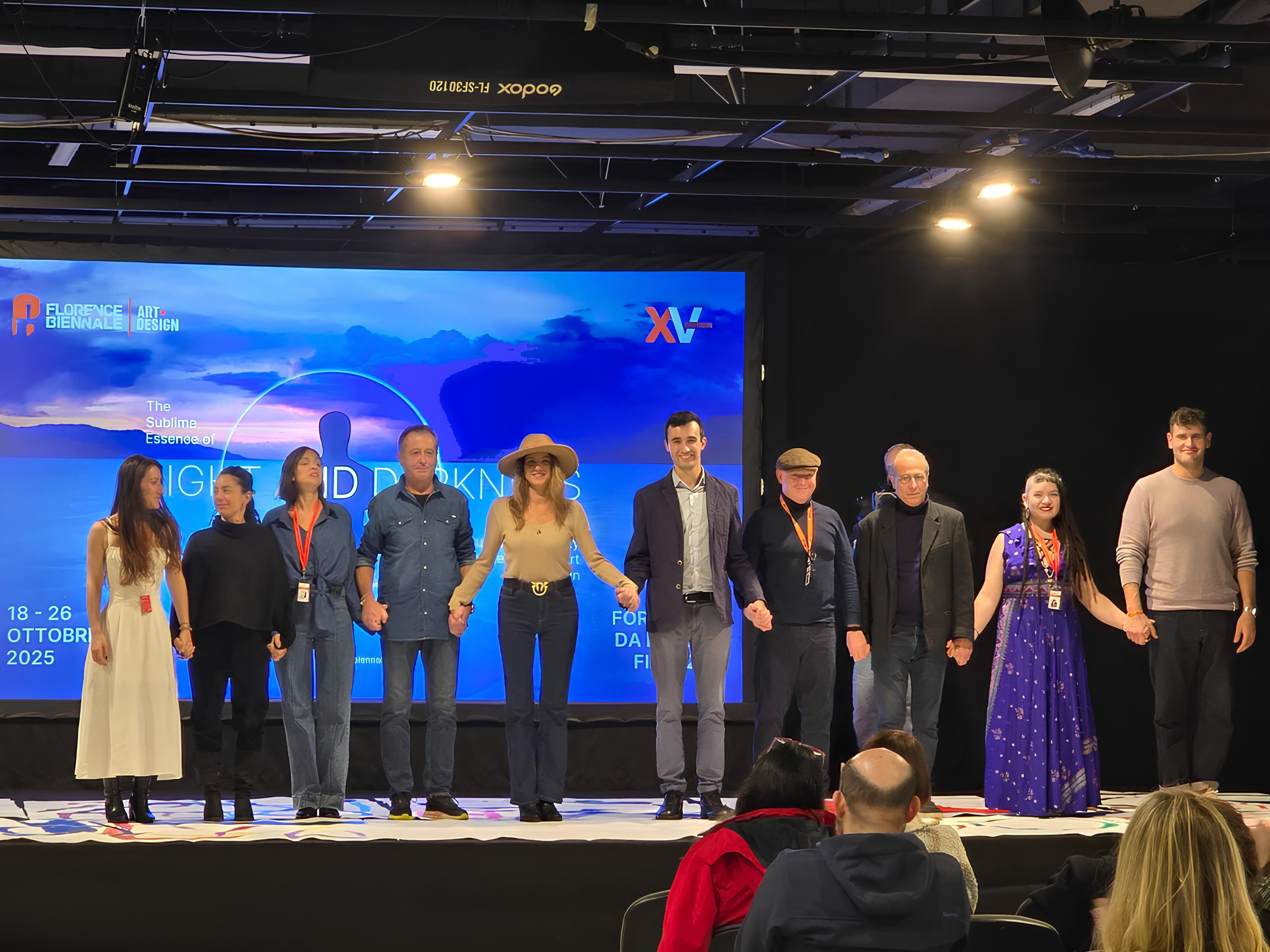
  Homage to John Cage – Performance by Sergio Maltagliati at the 15th Florence Biennale (2025)
- 2025 Homage to John Cage 4’33’’. In 2025, Maltagliati took part in the 15th Florence Biennale of Contemporary Art with the multimedia performance Homage to John Cage, a tribute to the composer’s 4’33’’. The work explored Cage’s concepts of attentive listening and chance, integrating sound, image, and public interaction.

According to the Italian newspaper La Nazione, the performance also addressed issues of cultural individualism and the normalization of art, proposing an experience based on participation and the unpredictability of the artistic event. The performance was filmed and documented by Marco Mazzi.

== Exhibitions ==
- His work has been exhibited, presented in festivals, galleries and even international institutions, including: HyperArt Web Gallery (New York); Istanbul Contemporary Art Museum; Rhizome.org; Mac, n-Museo di arte Contemporanea e del '900 (Monsummano Terme); Digital Pocket Gallery (Helsinki); PEAM Festival (Pescara); DigitalSoul San Francisco (USA); Melbourne Fringe Festival; Festival Carnivale Town Hall (Sydney); Electronic Language Festival (San Paolo del Brasile); Politecnico di Milano University (Italy); Salons de Musique Strasbourg (France); Sound Art Museum (Rome); Museum of Contemporary Art Mérida Yucatán (Mexico); Eyedrum Gallery Atlanta, GA (USA); MAXXI – National Museum of the 21st Century Arts (Rome) 2007 and 2018; Galerie De Meerse Hoofddorp (Amsterdam); Italian Cultural Institute (Cairo); PAN (palace arts Naples Italy); Museo della Civiltà Romana – Rome (Italy); Art Laboratory Berlin; Centro per l'arte contemporanea Luigi Pecci – Prato (Italy);
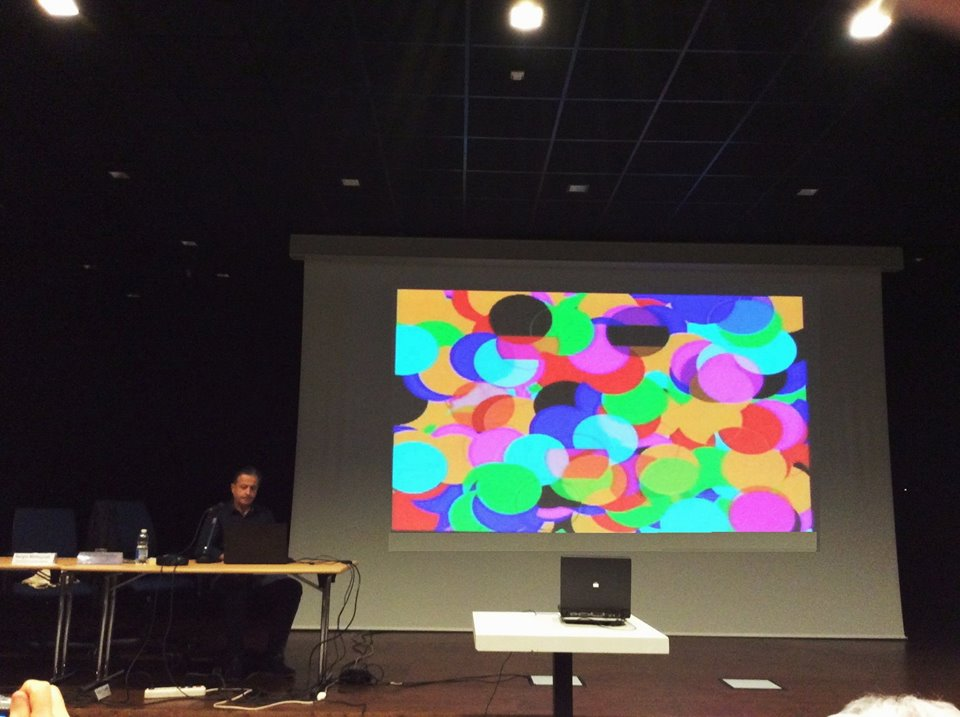
  "Circus Mix" generated live exhibition-Centro per l'arte contemporanea Luigi Pecci- Prato (2017)
  T_D Art Gallery Crema, Cremona (Italy); SREINER Gallery, Vienna (Austria); CAPTALOONA Art Gallery (Madrid); XIV Florence Biennale (2023) installation (Après Fluxus) and performance Art; Accademia delle Arti del Disegno Florence (2024) concerto; XV Florence Biennale (2025) TRIBUTE TO JOHN CAGE Performance;

== Bibliography ==
- Atlante del'Arte Contemporanea Corporate Patron of The Metropolitan Museum of Art - edizione illustrata Giunti Editore - ISBN 978-88-09-91517-6 (2024)
- I AM YOU XIV Florence Biennale" ed. Giorgio Mondadori - ISBN 978-88-374-2404-6 (2023) (in English)
- The Routledge Companion to Literary Media (Routledge Literature Companions) ed. Routledge (2023) (in English)
- EI VIERIU - ARTES. JOURNAL OF MUSICOLOGY, 2023 (in English)
- Musica Presente Tendenze e compositori di oggi by Renzo Cresti ed. Libreria Musicale Italiana – ISBN 9788855430012 (2019) (in Italian)
- POLITEHNIKA 2019 Scientific Conference ed. Belgrade Polytechnic – ISBN 978-86-7498-081-1
- When Sound Becomes Form Sound Experiments in Italy 1950-2000 ed. Manfredi – ISBN 978-88-99519-86-5 (2019) (in Italian and English)
- The Information Society An International Journal Volume 34, 2018-Issue 3 (2018) (in English)
- Encyclopedia of Computer Art by Marylynn Lyman ed. Learning Press New York – ISBN 978-1-280-25168-9 (2016) (in English)
- Encyclopedia of New Media Art by Joe Street ed. Orange Apple – ISBN 978-1-283-48829-7 (2016) (in English)
- 80 identikit digitali by Carlo Mazzucchelli ed. Delos Digital – ISBN 9788867756414 (2015) (in Italian)
- INVISIBILIDADES revista ibero-americana de pesquisa em educacao, cultura e artes – ISSN 1647-0508 (2014)
- Enore Zaffiri-Saggi e materiali by Andrea Valle & Stefano Bassanese ISBN 9788890341328 (2014) (in Italian and English)
- Topología Barcelona, Athens. Triton Barcelona. Triton ISBN 978-84-938482-5-5 (Triton Barcelona)ISBN 3-85486-212-1 (2014)
- HomeBook 45 unicum graphics, by Pietro Grossi, Sergio Maltagliati, ed. Lulu.com, 2012. ISBN 978-1-4716-1419-4 (in English and Italian)
- Random Valentina Tanni, LINK Editions, Brescia 2011-ISBN 978-1-4477-1182-7 (in Italian)
- Sguardi Sonori/Infinite Spaces, by Ennio Morricone, Enrico Saggese, Roberto Vittori, Neil Leonard, Gualtiero Marchesi, (2010) ed.Municipality of Rome (in Italian and English)
- Generative Art, by Celestino Soddu, Enrica Colabella, (2009) ed. Domus Argenia Publisher. (in English)
- Il Senso Trascurato, by Luigi Agostini, (2009) Edizioni Lulu.com (in Italian)
- Netspace: viaggio nell'arte della rete – Net Archives by Elena Giulia Rossi, (2009) Roma, ed. MAXXI Museo Nazionale delle Arti del XXI secolo.
- Attraversamenti, la musica in Toscana dal 1945 ad oggi, by Daniele Lombardi, Firenze 2009, Regione Toscana, Consiglio Regionale, Edizioni dell'Assemblea.
- Arte delle reti / Net Art – Elementi per un atlante: liste e linee temporali (2007) Edizioni UCAN – BOOK001 (in Italian)
- AD LIBITUM. Musica da vedere, by N. Cisternino, I. Gómez, F. Mariani e M. Ratti, (2003) SilvanaEditoriale (in English and Italian)
- Information Arts, Stephen Wilson, (2003) MIT Press ISBN 0-262-73158-4 (in English)
- Attraversamenti by Daniele Lombardi: La musica in Toscana dal 1945 ad oggi 2002 (Firenze, Maschetto&Musolino) (in Italian)
- Partiture Assessorato alla Cultura Comune Montecatini terme (1991) CID/Arti Visive Centro Luigi Pecci Prato (in Italian)

=== CD / DVD ===
- Suono, segno, gesto visione a Firenze (Sound, sign, gesture, vision in Florence)
  - (CD 1): Sylvano Bussotti, Giancarlo Cardini, Giuseppe Chiari, Daniele Lombardi
  - (CD 2): Pietro Grossi, Giuseppe Chiari, Giancarlo Cardini, Albert Mayr, Daniele Lombardi, Marcello Aitiani, Sergio Maltagliati (Atopos music 1999-2008).
    The path of more than fifty years of musical culture in Florence, since the end of the Second World War, is documented in these two audio CDs. This audio recording contains the meeting of composers and pianists who are the protagonists of the Music of Art in Florence, a significant phenomenon in the history of the second half of the twentieth century.
- CIRCUS_8 DVD video Quantum Bit Limited Edition (2009) QuBIT 005 (in English)
- The Wave Structure of Matter Quantum Bit Netlabel (2011) QuBIT 007 (in English)
- CIRCUS_5.1 DVD (digital edition) Quantum Bit Netlabel (2012) QuBIT 013 (in English)
- BATTIMENTI 2.5 audio Cd – numbered copy of limited edition (2019) CD

=== Audio tape ===
(Cassette tape)

- 1992 Trasparenze
- 1993 Alla ricerca dei silenzi perduti
- 1995 Serie di colore per flauti
- 1996 Per una sola nota work homage to Giacinto Scelsi.
- 1997 Partiture per floppy disk

Recorder from original tape Quantum Bit Limited Edition
