= Armonie del pianeta Saturno =

Musical composition by Roberto Lupi

- by Roberto Lupi
- Ending of RAI's closing video, frequently associated with the work
- Key: F-sharp minor
- Composed: 1946
- Duration: 35 seconds

Armonie del pianeta Saturno (Planet Saturn's harmonies), also known as Le arie di Saturno (The Rings of Saturn) or simply Saturno (Saturn), is a composition for oboe, harp and strings from Italian musician Roberto Lupi. Composed in 1946, it was known for closing RAI's television networks from 3 January 1954 to 26 January 1986.

== Usage ==
In 1954, RAI started television broadcasts and used an animation by Erberto Carboni, who also designed its corporate logo and the TV icon in 1953. For the launch of Rete 3, an additional channel-specific sequence was added, preceding the Roberto Lupi closing.

The sequence on television featured an abstract design of an antenna, nicknamed antennone, featuring the TV logo, after which it faded to reveal the Fine delle Trasmissioni (End of Transmission) message.

== Replacement ==
RAI announced in January 1986 that, as part of its brand repositioning, it would replace the existing sequence with a new one, putting an end to its daily usage after 32 years. It was previewed on RAI's newscasts and Domenica in on 26 January; that night, the existing sequence and the related composition aired for the final time on Italian television. The new animation, commissioned by RAI from a London facility, featured the national anthem and three flying bars, representing the Flag of Italy.

== In popular culture ==
Armonie del pianeta Saturno is the most heard and most recognized composition by Roberto Lupi. Millions of Italians (especially during the television monopoly) have heard it during its 32-year usage.

The composition appeared, in whole or in part, on Italian films and TV series:

- 1963 – I mostri by Dino Risi (episode L'oppio dei popoli)
- 1963 – The Hours of Love by Luciano Salce
- 1964 – Let's Talk About Women by Ettore Scola
- 1969 – La famiglia Benvenuti by Alfredo Giannetti (final episode of season 2)
- 1969 – I See Naked by Dino Risi
- 1974 – Sabato sera dalle nove alle dieci by Giancarlo Nicotra (variety show, start of the second edition)
- 1975 – Giandomenico Fracchia - Sogni proibiti di uno di noi by Antonello Falqui (episode Fracchia e la TV)
- 1988 – Chiari di luna by Lello Arena
- 1993 – Mille bolle blu by Leone Pompucci
- 2003 – Good Morning, Night by Marco Bellocchio

An exhibit by Thomas Braida, Mattematiche Notturne (Night Mathematics) was inspired by the work and its association with the RAI TV closing sequence. It was used as a point of reference for the comparison between society in 2023 and the same between 1954 and 1985.

The piece was played in 2023 by the Esecutori di Metallo su Carta ensemble at the Everything Everywhere All at Once festival in Milan.
