= Roberto Lupi =

Italian composer and conductor (1908–1971)

- Roberto Lupi (photo with 1952 dedication)
- Born: 28 November 1908; Milan, Italy
- Died: 17 April 1971 (aged 62); Dornach, Switzerland
- Occupations: classical composer; conductor; music theorist

Roberto Lupi (28 November 1908 – 17 April 1971) was an Italian composer, conductor, and music theorist. Born in Milan and trained at the conservatory there, he began his conducting career in 1937. His compositions of experimental music included large-scale works for chorus and orchestra, chamber music, and stage works. However, Lupi's most widely heard piece was his Armonie del pianeta Saturno for oboe (or, sometimes, trumpet), harp and strings which was played each night from 1954 to 1986 at the close of RAI television transmissions. He held the chair in composition at the Florence Conservatory from 1941 until his death and published three books on music theory, the last of them posthumously. From the 1950s, his theoretical approach and his compositions, especially his stage works, were strongly influenced by the ideas of Rudolf Steiner.

== Life and career ==
Lupi was born in Milan to Maria née Torelli and Ermanno Lupi. His father was a school teacher and talented amateur violinist from Guastalla. His grandfather had been a professional violinist who died on a concert tour of South America in 1895. While his father was away in World War I, the family moved back to Guastalla, where Lupi began his music studies at the age of 8. When the war ended, the family returned to Milan, and he continued his studies at the Milan Conservatory. He received diplomas in piano (1927) and cello (1928) before he began his study of composition under Arrigo Pedrollo, graduating from the conservatory in 1934. In 1937, he won the first Rassegna Nazionale, a competition for young conductors, and after a period of further study at the Accademia di Santa Cecilia with Bernardino Molinari, began an active career as a conductor.

== Stage works ==
- Orfeo, choreographed cantata to a libretto based on Book IV of Virgil's Georgics, choreography by Janine Charrat. Premiere: La Fenice, Venice, 19 September 1951
- La nuova Euridice, opera (mistero melodrammatico) in three acts to a libretto by Maria Della Quercia (Eva Bagni). Premiere: Teatro Donizetti, Bergamo, 3 October 1957
- La danza di Salomè, opera in one act set to an anonymous 14th-century text. Premiere: Teatro della Pergola, Florence, 11 May 1960
- Persefone, opera in one act to a libretto by Maria Della Quercia (Eva Bagni) based on the myth of Persephone, choreography by Giulio Chazalettes. Premiere: Teatro Comunale, Florence, 9 January 1970

== Music theory ==
- Armonia di gravitazione. Rome: De Santis,1946
- Ars bene movendi. Milan: Carish, 1969
- Il libro segreto di un musicista. Florence: Nardini, 1972
