= Albert Mayr =

Italian composer (1943–2024)

- Born: Bolzano, Italy
- Died: January 28, 2024; Florence, Italy
- Education: Florence Conservatory (Graduated in music and choral singing, 1965)
- Parents: Josef Mayr (father); Nusser (mother)
- Website: http://albertmayr.com/

Albert Mayr (1 August 1943 – 28 January 2024) was an Italian composer of experimental and contemporary music. He studied music and composition in three different cities: at conservatories in both Bolzano and Florence and at the Darmstädter Ferienkurse in German.

In 1965, Mayr graduated in music and choral singing from the Florence Conservatory.

From 1963 to 1969, Mayr worked with Pietro Grossi at "Fonologia Musicale's study" in Florence and received commissions from the musicological division of CNUCE/CNR. He received commissions from Südtiroler Künstlerbund, from "Brixner Iniziative Musik und Kirche" and from Sound Art at Mobius, Massachusetts Council on the Arts and Humanities.

He is a composer of the Florentine artistic movement that has been active since the end of World War II up to the present, including Sylvano Bussotti, Giuseppe Chiari, Giancarlo Cardini, Sergio Maltagliati, Daniele Lombardi, Pietro Grossi, Lelio Camilleri, Francesco Giomi. These musicians have experimented with the interaction among sound, sign and vision, a synaesthetics of art derived from historical avant-gardes, from Wassily Kandinsky to futurism, to Alexander Scriabin and Arnold Schoenberg, all the way to Bauhaus.

From 1969 to 1970, Mayr earned a "Canada Council Fellowship" for electronic music.

From 1970 to 1973, Mayr was in Montréal at Faculty of Music at McGill University. From 1973 to 1990, he taught electronic and experimental music at Conservatory of Florence. Between 1974 and 1975, Mayr organized musical sessions at a psychiatric hospital in Volterra (Tuscany). In 1975, Mayr worked with the World Soundscape Project. Since 1977, Mayr has been the editor of conferences and seminars at the Sounds/Ambient in Zona in (Florence) and at Centro International of Brera, Milan. Since 1979, Mayr has been a member of the International Society for the Study of Time.

In 1980, he founded "Musica Oggi". In 1984 and 1985 he released the documentary Von Zeiten und Leuten: am Beispiel Sarntal, a commission from RAI. Since 1985, Mayr has been a member of "Association for Social Studies of Time". In 1986 he has been editor of the session of "Vivere nel Tempo" meetings, organized by "Provincia di Firenze".

In 1990, Mayr was the coordinator of Laboratory of "Progettazione Temporale" by Filcams/CGIL in Florence. In 1994, he was coordinator of the "Il Castello Del Tempo" meetings, organized by "Provincia di Firenze" at Pratolino-Villa Demidoff's park. Since 1995, he has been a member of Forum für Klanglandschaft.

In 2004, Mayr released Proposte sonore, seven electronic compositions played in the 1970s and an instrumental track played in 1983. In 2009, Mayr released Tape for Live Musicians by Miraloop, an independent Italian label. "Tape for Live Musicians" consists of three tracks. One of these was developed at musical research centre Tempo Reale, founded by Luciano Berio and directed by the colleague Francesco Giomi.

Mayr died on 28 January 2024, at the age of 80.

== See also ==
- Acousmatic music
