= Pietro Grossi =

Italian composer (1917–2002)

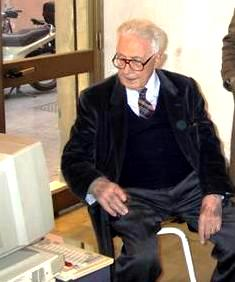
- Grossi in 2001
- Born: 15 April 1917; Venice, Italy
- Died: 21 February 2002 (aged 84); Florence
- Education: Conservatorio Giovanni Battista Martini Bologna
- Occupations: Composer, programmer, visual artist, artist computer scientist
- Style: Electronic, Computer music
- Partner: Albert Mayr – Sergio Maltagliati
- Website: pietrogrossi.org

Signature
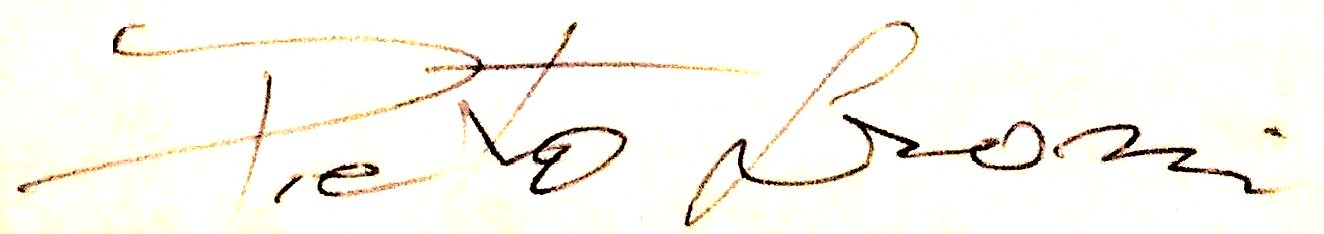

Pietro Grossi (15 April 1917 – 21 February 2002) was an Italian composer pioneer of computer music, visual artist and hacker ahead of his time. He began experimenting with electronic techniques in Italy in the early sixties.

== Biography ==
Pietro Grossi was born in Venice, and he studied in Bologna eventually taking a diploma in composition and violoncello. In the sixties Grossi taught at the Florence Conservatory and began to research and experiment with electroacoustic music. From 1936 to 1966 was the first cellist of the Maggio Musicale Fiorentino orchestra. Grossi began to experiment with electroacoustic music in the 1950s. By 1962, he had become the first Italian to carry out successful research in the field of computer music.

In 1963, he turned his interest to electronic music and founded the S 2F M (Studio di Fonologia Musicale di Firenze) which made its headquarters at the Florence Conservatory, and he also became a lecturer in this subject.

In 1964 he organized events with the association Contemporary Musical Life that introduced in Italy the work of John Cage. In 1965 he obtained the institution of the first professorship of Electronic Music in Italy.

In 1967 he made the first experiences in computer music.

In 1970 he made his first approaches to musical telematics organizing a performance with a link between Rimini (Pio Manzù Foundation) and Pisa (CNUCE). By invitation of Iannis Xenakis, he presented another telematic concert between Pisa and Paris in 1974.

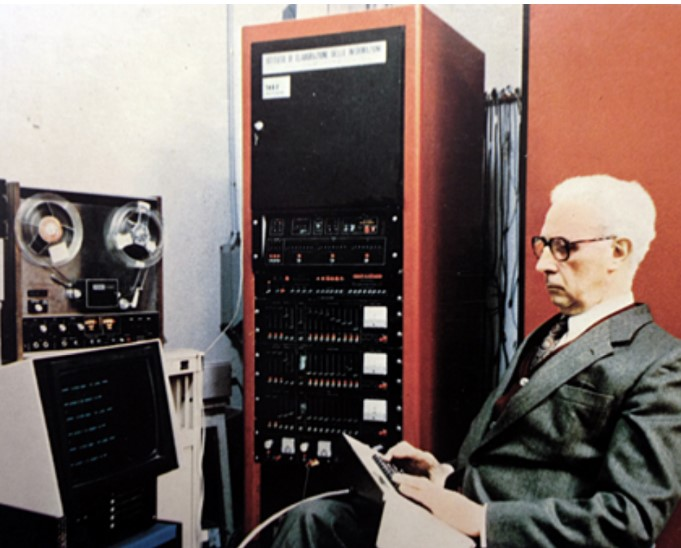
Grossi in front of the original TAUmus/TAU2 station. On the right, a glimpse of the analog part of the TAU2 audio synthesizer; in the center, its digital part. On the left the video terminal connected to the IBM mainframe, with its keyboard on the lap of Grossi.

His contributions to the development of new technological musical instruments and to the creation of software packages for music-processing design have been fundamental with the original TAUmus/TAU2 station.

He has not limited his work to the musical world, but also engaged in contemporary art. In the eighties he was working on new forms of artistic production oriented toward the use of personal computers in the visual arts. Grossi started to develop visual elaborations created on a personal computer with programs provided with "self-decision making" and that works out the concept of "HomeArt" (1986), by way of the personal computer, raises the artistic aspirations and potential latent in each one of us to the highest level of autonomous decision making conceivable today, and the idea of personal artistic expression: "a piece is not only a work (of art), but also one of the many 'works' one can freely transform: everything is temporary, everything can change at any time, ideas are not personal anymore, they are open to every solution, everybody could use them".

Grossi has always been interested in every form of artistic expression. The last step of his HomeArt, is the creation of a series of unicum books, electronically produced and symbolically called "HomeBooks" (1991): each work is completely different from the others, thanks to the strong flexibility of the digital means. Sergio Maltagliati will continue this project creating autom@tedVisuaL software in 2012, which generates always different graphical variations. It is based on HomeArt's BBC BASIC source code. This first release autom@tedVisuaL 1.0 has produced 45 graphical single samples, which have been sampled and published. He collaborated in order to experiment with electronic sound and composition with the computer music division of "CNUCE" (Institute of the National Research Council of Pisa).

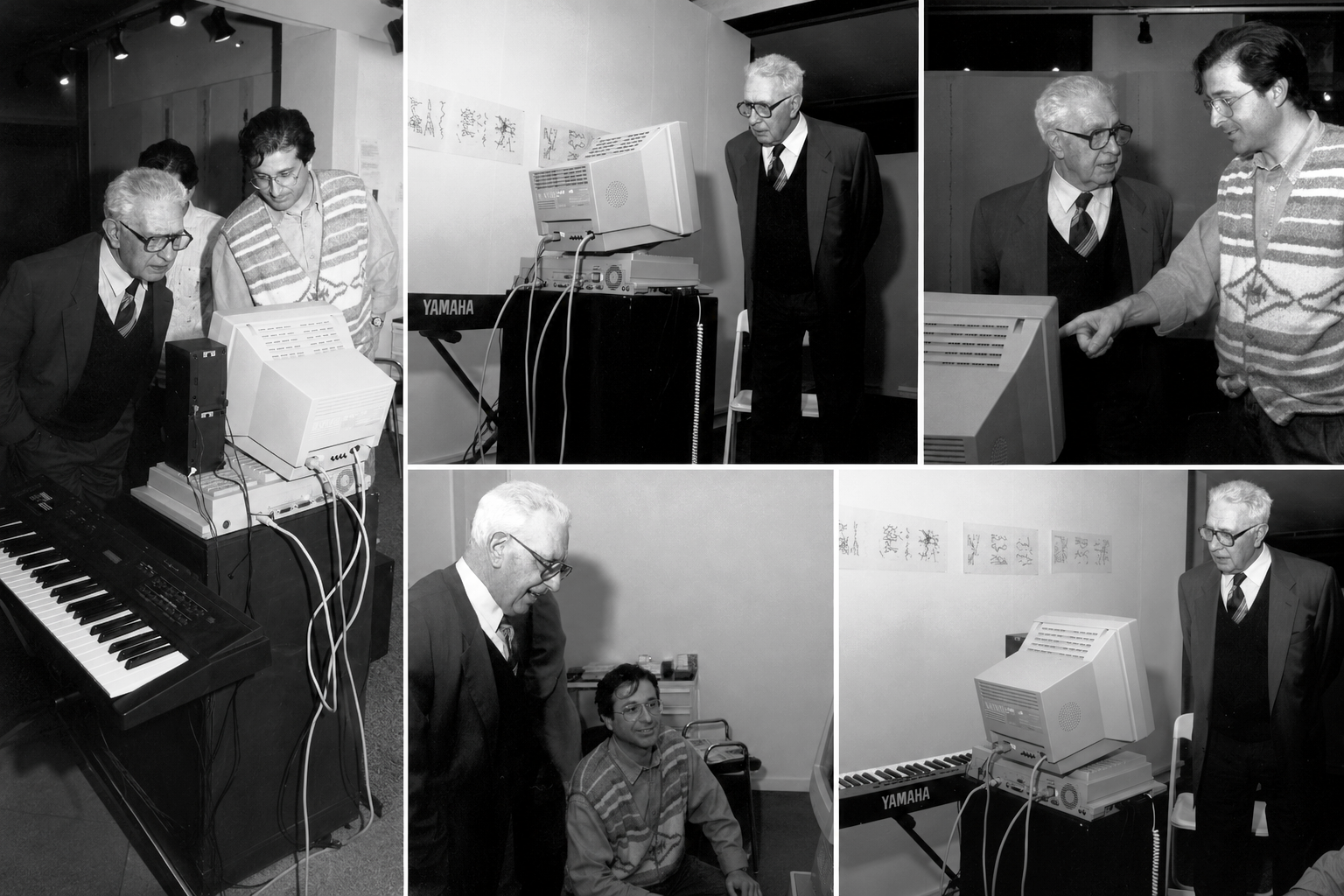
Pietro Grossi visiting Sergio Maltagliati's exhibition at Galleria Il Gabbiano, La Spezia, March 1997.

Grossi's latest multimedia experiments were with interactive sound and graphics. His later works involved automated and generative visual music software, autom@tedVisualMusiC 1.0 which he extended beyond the realms of music into the interactive work for the Internet, conceiving and collaborating with Sergio Maltagliati in 1997 of the first Italian interactive work for the web netOper@, entertaining in his own house study the first on-line performance. However, NeXtOper@ remains unfinished, a project to integrate new media, such as mobile phone and GPS.

Grossi died in 2002 at the age of 84 in Florence.

== Selected works ==
- 1961 Progretto 2–3 this piece consisting of several different high monotones that follow one another, is extremely minimal and ambient, controlled by a computer algorithm.
- 1965 Battimenti an electronic work composed and realized from "working material" for the electronic Studio di Fonologia Musicale (S 2F M), made by the 94 combinations of near frequencies.
- 1969 Collage where the concepts of music being an open process where no work of music is a finished piece but rather something to be manipulated.
- 1980 Computer Music transcription and elaborations (with Soft TAUMUS synthesizer TAU2, IBM 370/168 Institutes of CNR CNUCE and IEI) from the following authors: Bach, Scarlatti, Paganini, Brahms, Chopin, Strawinskij, Debussy, Joplin, Satie, Webern, Hindemith, Stockhausen.
- 1985–90 Mixed Unicum another ambient drone piece, similar to Progretto 2–3 and yet far more varied and rewarding, as the shifting tones create an alien topography of sound.
- 1986 HomeArt Grossi has developed the concept of HomeArt. It consists of completely automated and generative visual processes, based on simple Qbasic computer programs .

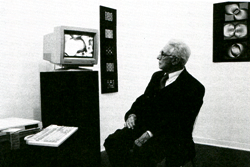
Pietro Grossi and HomeArt (ph. Paola Zucchello)

== Bibliography ==
- Sergio Maltagliati, HomeBook 45 unicum graphics, 2012. ISBN 978-1-4716-1419-4 (in English and Italian)
- Girolamo De Simone, Il dito nella marmellata, Musica d'arte a Firenze, 2005, ed. Nardini – ISBN 978-88-404-2704-1
- Francesco Giomi; Marco Ligabue, L' istante zero. Conversazioni e riflessioni con Pietro Grossi, 1999, ed. Sismel – ISBN 88-87027-65-X
- Lelio Camilleri, Pietro Grossi. Musica senza musicisti, scritti 1966–1996, ed. CNUCE CNR Pisa
- Lelio Camilleri, "Computational Musicology in Italy", Leonardo, Journal of the International Society for the Arts, Sciences, and Technology (Leonardo/ISAST), The MIT Press, Cambridge, U.S., vol. 21, no. 4, 1988, pp. 454–456.
- Francesco Giomi, The Italian Artist Pietro Grossi. From Early Electronic Music to Computer Art, in Leonardo, Journal of the International Society for the Arts, Sciences, and Technology (Leonardo/ISAST), MIT Press, Cambridge, U.S., vol. 28 n. 1, 1995, pp. 35–39.

== Discography ==
- Visioni di vita spaziale (Edizioni Leonardi Srl under licence to Pirames International Srl, 1967)
- Elettrogreca (Edizioni Leonardi Srl under licence to Pirames International Srl, 1967)
- GE-115 Computer Concerto (General Electrics, 1968)
- Elettro musica N.1 (Edizioni Leonardi Srl under licence to Pirames International Srl, 1971)
- Elettro musica N.2 (Edizioni Leonardi Srl under licence to Pirames International Srl, 1971)
- Computer Music (CNUCE/CNR, 1972)
- Atmosfera & elettronica (Edizioni Leonardi Srl under licence to Pirames International Srl, 1972)
- Computer Music – Bach/Grossi (LP, Ayma, 1980)
- Paganini al computer (LP, Edipan, 1982)
- Computer Music – Satie/Joplin/Grossi (LP, Edipan, 1983)
- Sound Life (LP, Edipan, 1985)
- Battimenti (CD, ants records, 2003)
- Suono, Segno, Gesto Visione a Firenze (Sound, sign, gesture, vision in Florence)
  - (CD 1): Sylvano Bussotti, Giancarlo Cardini, Giuseppe Chiari, Daniele Lombardi
  - (CD 2): Pietro Grossi, Giuseppe Chiari, Giancarlo Cardini, Albert Mayr, Daniele Lombardi, Marcello Aitiani, Sergio Maltagliati (Atopos music 1999–2008).
    The path of more than fifty years of musical culture in Florence, since the end of the Second World War, is documented in these two audio CDs. This audio recording contains the meeting of composers and pianists who are the protagonists of the Music of Art in Florence, a significant phenomenon in the history of the second half of the twentieth century.
- Musicautomatica (CD, Die Schachtel, 2008)
- BATTIMENTI 2.5 audio Cd – numbered copy of limited edition (2019)

=== DVD video ===
- CIRCUS_8 DVD video Quantum Bit Limited Edition (2008)
- CIRCUS_5.1 DVD (digital edition) Quantum Bit Netlabel (2012)
