= Giuseppe Chiari (artist-composer-philosopher) =

Giuseppe Chiari (26 September 1926 – 9 May 2007) was an avant-garde Florentine conceptual artist and experimental musician active in Neo-Dada circles, specifically the Fluxus art movement. Chiari was a supporter of intermedia work conducted between music, speech, gesture and image.

== Life and work ==
Giuseppe Chiari was born in Florence, Italy on 26 September 1926.

In Florence he devoted himself to studying piano and music composition, in parallel with studies in mathematics and engineering (1946–51).

He is an exponent and main promoter of the group of Florentine artists, operating from the end of the Second World War to today, and including Sylvano Bussotti, Daniele Lombardi, Giancarlo Cardini, Albert Mayr, Pietro Grossi, Marcello Aitiani and Sergio Maltagliati. These musicians have experimented with the interaction among sound, sign and vision, a synaesthesia of art derived from historical avant-gardes, from Kandinsky to futurism, to Scriabin and Schoenberg, all the way to Bauhaus.

He was especially drawn to the work of John Cage, and himself began to take an interest in promoting experimental research in visual music in 1961. In 1962, at the Fluxus Festspiele internationale Neuester Musik in Wiesbaden, he joined the Fluxus group, taking on the role of artist-composer-philosopher. Among his writings are: Music without counterpoint (1969), Untitled (1971), Mother Music (1973); Teatrino (1974) Art (1974), Method for playing (1976); Aesthetik (1984), Doubt harmony (1990) and Music (1994).

Chiari made what he called "action music" based on a complex method of execution and traditional instruments: music that takes as its essential element random sounds (water, dry leaves, stones). His work "Giuocare con l'acqua e dire la parola acqua" ("Playing with water and saying the word water") is quite remarkable for both the transformation of the pages of the script into an aesthetic object, and the clarity and rigour of the texts that preludes to the later production of statements typical of conceptual art. His work Fogli pentagrammati, 1975, is in Museo cantonale d'arte of Lugano.

Chiari experimented with different visual mediums: including painting-collages, sheet music, and photographs. His graphic and pictorial work is partially preserved at the International Centre of Contemporary Art Tornabuoni in Florence.

== See also ==
- Performance art
- Happenings
- Fluxus
- Intermedia
- Experimental theatre
- Avant-garde
