= Fabio Casadei Turroni =

Italian novelist, musicologist, journalist

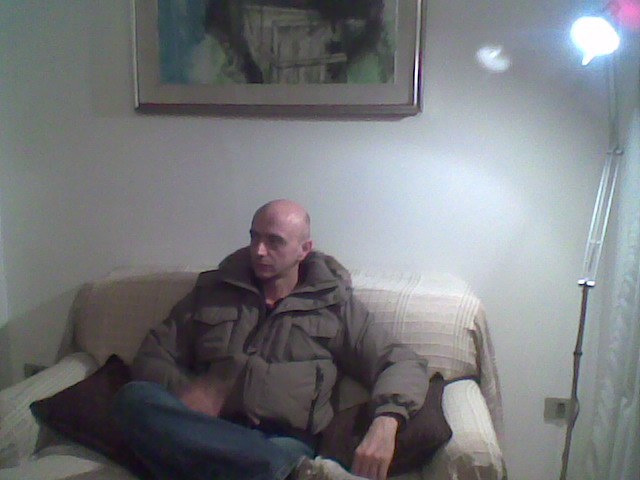
- Born: November 1964 (age 61–62); Forlì, Italy
- Occupations: Novelist, musicologist
- Writing career
- Period: 2001-date
- Genres: Novels, poetry, libretti, translation
- Notable awards: 2001 GLBT Art Competition

Fabio Casadei Turroni (born November 10, 1964) is an Italian novelist, musicologist and journalist. Son of the painter Rino Casadei Turroni, he studied singing and got his bachelor's degree as a musicologist at the Department of Art and Music at Bologna State University. He then established himself as a lyrical tenor. At the age of 38 he gave up performing because of his health troubles, and started writing novels. He currently lives between Bologna and Milan.

His debut novel, Moto Perpetuo (Perpetuum Mobile), was a best seller and won the first prize at the 2001 GLBT Art Competition. His second novel Cosmicomiche Orgasmiche (a clear tribute to Italo Calvino's Cosmicomiche) was published one year after. The third novel Angelo d'Edimburgo was published in 2006. The preface of the novel was written by the writer Roberto Pazzi, and the postface was written by the composer Sylvano Bussotti.

In 2007 Casadei Turroni wrote the libretto for an opera, Ceneraccio (Cinderella), taken from old Norwegian tales. The music was written by Sylvano Bussotti. Casadei Turroni also translated poems by Christopher Isherwood into Italian for musical settings by Sylvano Bussotti.

In 2022 he wrote the libretto for the opera Venere e Adone, put in music by Salvatore Sciarrino.

in 2026 he wrote the libretto for the Opera L'Agamennone, put in music by Salvatore Sciarrino.

Casadei Turroni is also a political activist in support of the International Lesbian and Gay Association and other LGBT organizations.

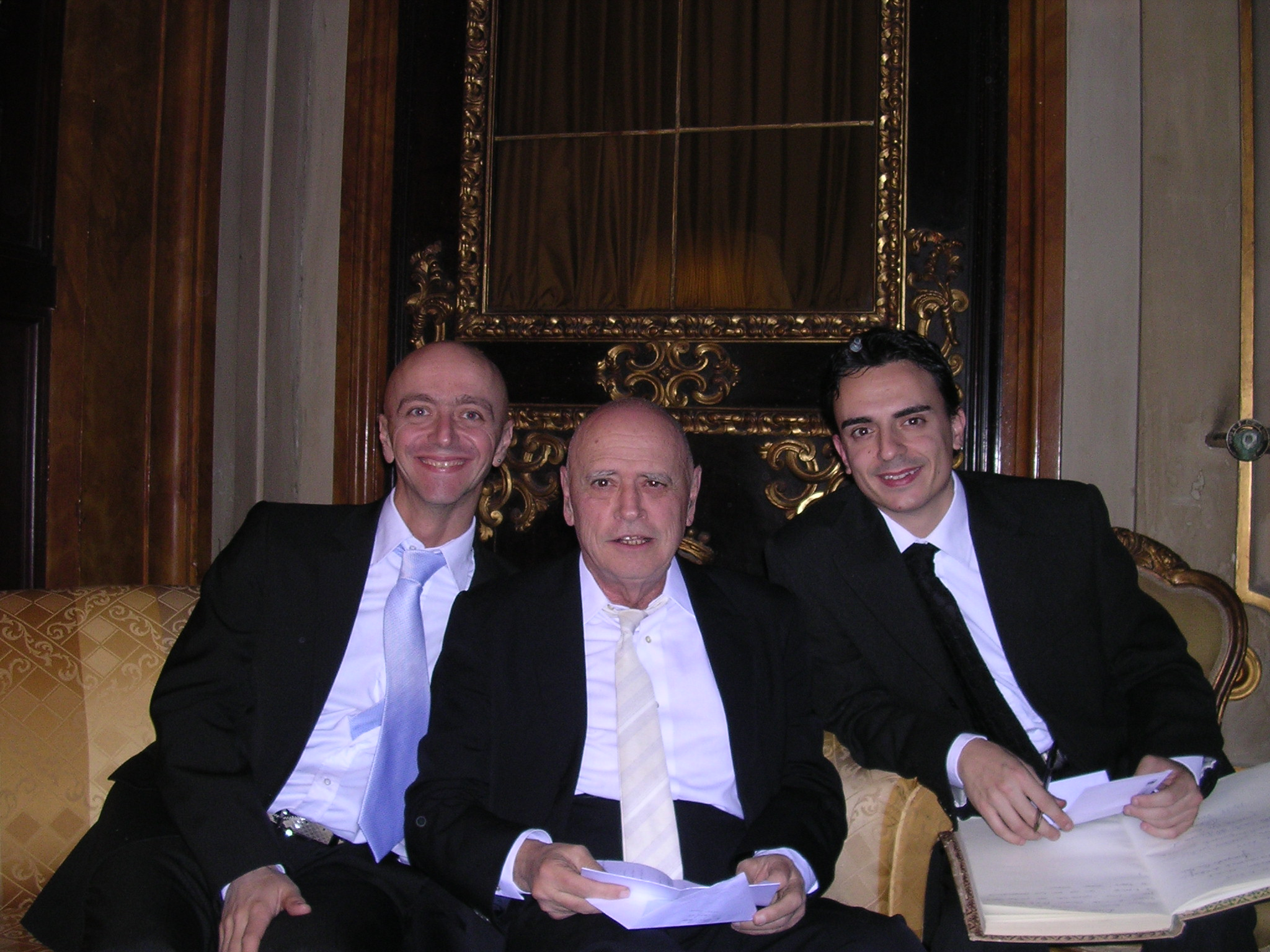
Fabio Casadei Turroni (left) together with Maestro Sylvano Bussotti and violinist Luca Paoloni (right) after a concert at Lyceum in Florence, Italy

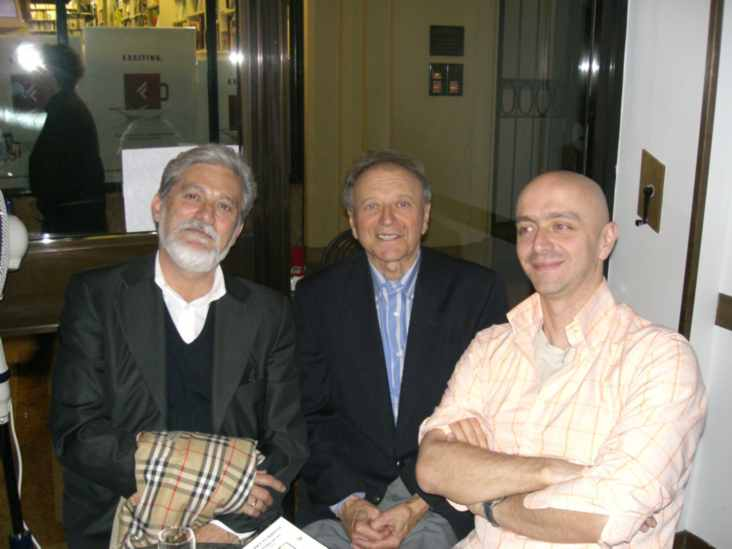
writer Roberto Pazzi (left), painter Rino Casadei Turroni (center), Fabio Casadei Turroni (right) in Bologna, 2006

== Works ==
Fiction

Novels

- Moto perpetuo, Zoe edition, Forlì, 2001
- Cosmicomiche Orgasmiche, Zoe edition, Forlì, 2002
- Angelo d'Edimburgo, LM edition, Bologna, 2005
- (ef)fusioni, ilmiolibro.it edition, 2011

Short novels

- Squilli, in Menomen2, Mondadori, Milan, 2002
- Alan, in Menonmen5, Mondadori, Milan, 2006
- L'ultimo, in Bolognaracconta, BSB edition, Bologna, 2008

Screenplay

- Il tributo, 2007

Music and literature essays

- Mozartiane II, Maggio Musicale Fiorentino, Florence, 2007
- Silvano-Sylvano, Accademia di Santa Cecilia, Rome, 2007
- Parole diverse, WLM edition, Bergamo, 2008
- Uccidere Bussotti - Ceneraccio, ilmiolibro edizioni, 2011
- Vocal technique in Thai BL soundtracks: a preliminary Study, academia.edu, 2025
