= Florence Conservatory =

Music school in Florence, Italy

Coordinates: 43.776401°N 11.258621°E

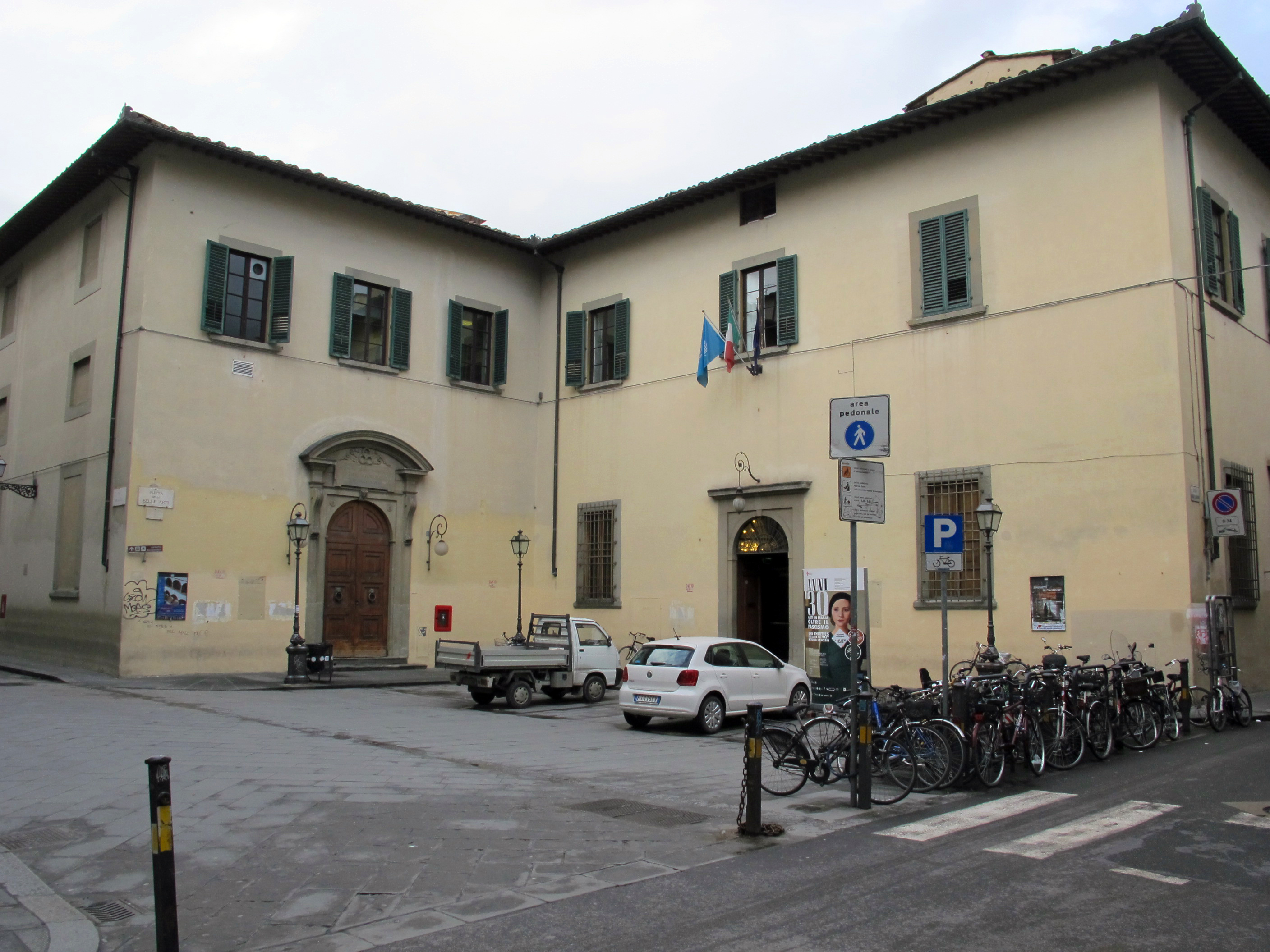
Conservatorio Luigi Cherubini

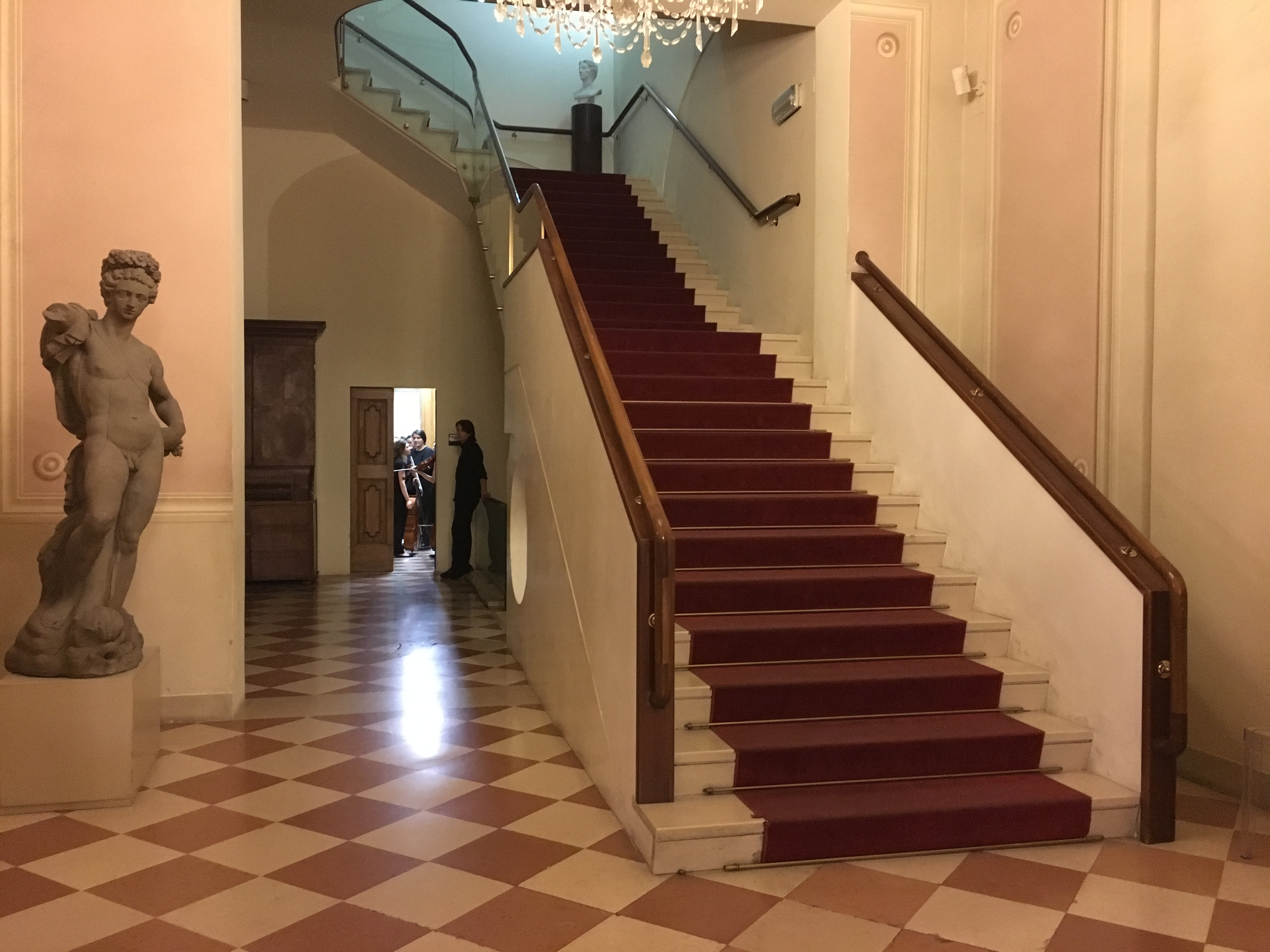

The Conservatorio Luigi Cherubini, better known in English as the Florence Conservatory is a music conservatory in Florence, Italy. It is the only music conservatory in Tuscany with the status of a national conservatory, and is operated by the government of Italy. The school's premises are located in the Piazzale delle Belle Arti with its main entrance located at the address 2 Via degli Alfani. Originally called the Istituto Musicale when it was founded in 1849, it was later renamed the Istituto Musicale Luigi Cherubini in 1910, and then the Regio Conservatorio di Musica Luigi Cherubini di Firenze in 1923. Its present name was adopted after the dissolution of the Kingdom of Italy in 1946.

== History ==
The Florence Conservatory was founded as the Istituto Musicale (English: Musical Institute) in 1849. It was established on 6 August 1849 by a decree from Leopold II, Grand Duke of Tuscany with Giovanni Pacini appointed the school's first director. The conservatory was originally created as a companion music school to the pre-existing Accademia di Belle Arti di Firenze with which it was initially affiliated. It became its own independent school in 1860. It was made so by royal decree from Victor Emmanuel II on 15 March 1860. In 1862 a new charter for the school was finalized at which point Luigi Ferdinando Casamorata succeeded Pacini as the school's second director.

In 1910 the Florence Conservatory was re-named the Istituto Musicale Luigi Cherubini (English: Musical Institute Luigi Cherubini) after the Florentine composer Luigi Cherubini (1760–1842). When the conservatory was given national status as a royal conservatory in 1923, it was re-named yet again to the Regio Conservatorio di Musica Luigi Cherubini di Firenze (English: Royal Conservatory of Music Luigi Cherubini of Florence). The royal title of the conservatory was dropped upon the dissolution of the Kingdom of Italy in 1946.

The conservatory occupies part of a former nunnery which was closed in the 18th century by the future Holy Roman Emperor Leopold II, then the Grand Duke of Tuscany (not to be confused with the earlier mentioned Leopold II).

== Directors ==
- Giovanni Pacini (1849–1862)
- Luigi Ferdinando Casamorata (1862–1881)
- Guido Tacchinardi (1881–1917)
- Ildebrando Pizzetti (1917–1923)
- Arnaldo Bonaventura (1923–1925, interim director)
- Giacomo Setaccioli (1925)
- Alberto Franchetti (1926–1928)
- Guido Guerrini (1928–1947)
- Vito Frazzi (1947, interim director)
- Adriano Lualdi (1947–1956)
- Antonio Veretti (1956–1970)
- Guido Turchi (1970–1972)
- Amleto Manetti (1972–1974)
- Valentino Bucchi (1974–1976)
- Firmino Sifonia (1977–1982)
- Giuseppe Giglio (1982–1999)
- Giovanni Cicconi (1999–2003)
- Mario Pazzaglia (2003–2006)
- Paolo Biordi (2006–2012)
- Flora Gagliardi (2012–2015)
- Paolo Zampini (2015–2021)
- Giovanni Pucciarmati (2021–)

== Alumni ==
- Francesco Attesti, pianist
- Emőke Baráth, soprano
- Stefano Bollani, jazz pianist
- Sylvano Bussotti, composer
- Matilde Capuis, composer, pianist, and organist
- Luigi Dallapiccola, composer, pianist, and writer on music
- Francesco Filidei, composer and organist
- Benedetto Ghiglia, composer, conductor, and pianist
- Sergio Maltagliati, composer
- Albert Mayr, composer
- Eva Mei, soprano
- Leonardo Pinzauti, music critic and music historian
- Nino Pirrotta, musicologist, pianist, and music critic
- Andrea Portera, composer
- Susanna Rigacci, soprano
- Francesco Siciliani, composer and music administrator

== Faculty ==
- Luigi Ferdinando Casamorata, maestro di cappella and later director of the conservatory
- Luigi Dallapiccola, professor of piano
- Vito Frazzi, professor of piano, harmony, counterpoint and composition
- Pietro Grossi, professor of cello and founder and director of electroacoustic music studio
- Riccardo Gandolfi, music librarian
- Roberto Lupi, professor of music composition
- Leonardo Pinzauti, professor of music history

== Musical instruments museum ==
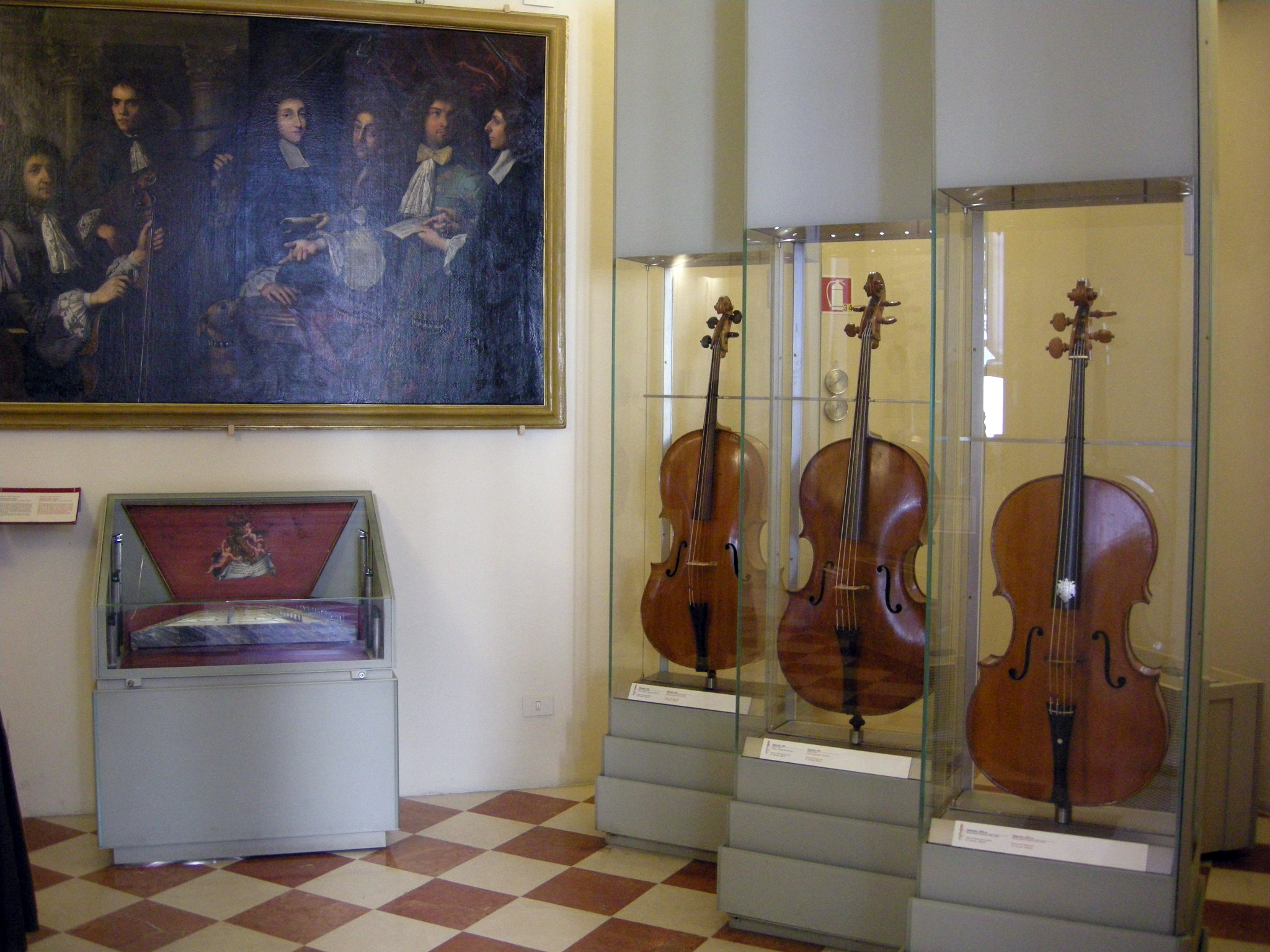

The conservatory acquired a notable collection of musical instruments, mainly dating from the time of the Grand Duchy of Tuscany. They are displayed to the public as the Museo degli strumenti musicali, accessed via the Galleria dell'Accademia, which is best known as the home of Michelangelo's David. The instruments include:

- instruments by Stradivari from a set by this luthier which belonged to the Medici court
  - Medici cello (1690)
  - Medici tenor viola (1690)
- 6 controviolino by Valentino De Zorzi
- a viola by Igino Sderci
- a violin and a viola by Luciano Sderci
- a doublebass by Bartolomeo Cristofori
- keyboard instruments by Bartolomeo Cristofori, the inventor of the piano, who was employed by the Medici to look after their instruments
