= Tempo Reale =

Italian music association

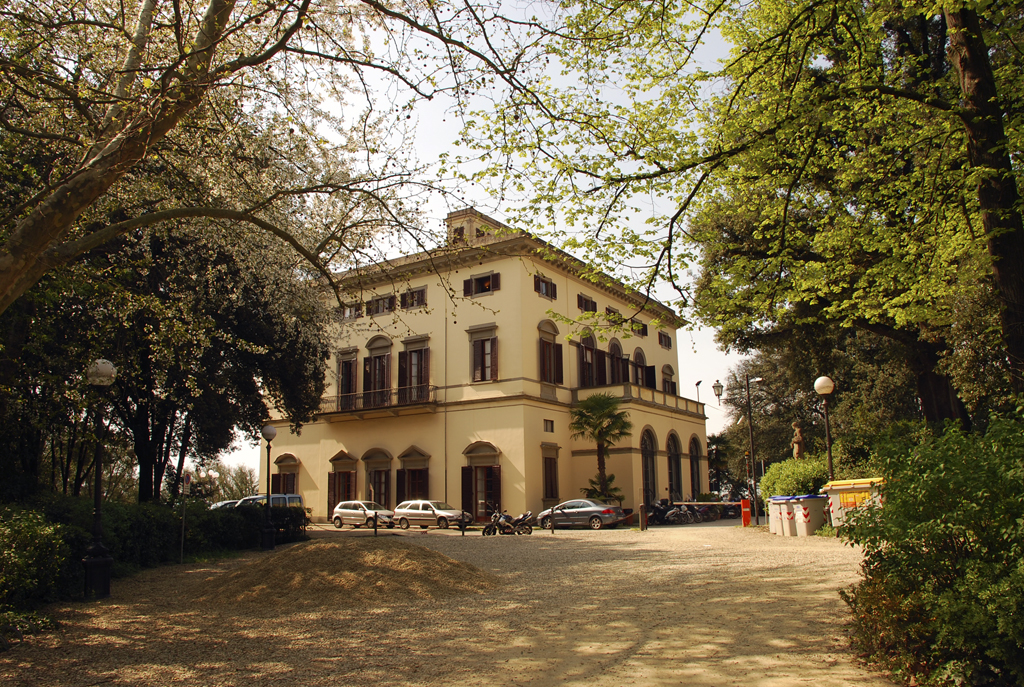
- Tempo Reale located in the historical villa owned by the Strozzi family of Florence
- Founder: Luciano Berio
- Established: 1987
- Focus: music research, production, and education
- President: Maurizio Frittelli
- Chair: Francesco Giomi
- Subsidiaries: Tempo Reale Festival
- Address: Via Pisana 77 - Villa Strozzi, 50143 Florence (Italy)
- Location: Florence, Italy
- Website: Official website

Tempo Reale is an electronic music research, production, and educational centre, based in Florence, Italy. It was founded by composer Luciano Berio, who served as the centre's director from 1987 to 2000, and as honorary president until his death in 2003. The centre has celebrated its 25-year anniversary in 2012.

== Notable collaborators with Luciano Berio ==
- Giorgio Battistelli (Italian composer)
- Henri Pousseur (Belgian composer)
- David Moss (American composer and percussionist, founder a director of Institute for Living Voice in Antwerp)
- Renzo Piano
