= Giulio Rossi =

Giulio Rossi may refer to:

- Giulio Rossi (bishop of Pescia) (1754–1833), Italian Roman Catholic Bishop
- Giulio Rossi (bishop of San Leone) (died 1654), Italian Roman Catholic Bishop
- Giulio Rossi (painter) (1824–1884), Italian painter and photographer
