= Ignazio Cirri =

Italian organist and composer

Ignazio Cirri or Giacomo Matteo Ignazio Cirri (20 September 1711 – 13 July 1787) was an Italian organist and composer in the 18th century. He was the brother of composer Giovanni Battista Cirri and the father of composer and violoncellist Giovanni Battista Cirri (born 1740). He was born and died in Forlì (current Emilia-Romagna). He was a friend of Giovanni Battista Martini, who had a portrait of Ignazio Cirri among his valuable men's portraits. In 1759, he became Maestro di cappella in the Cathedral of Forlì and he was admitted in the Philharmonic Academy of Bologna.

== Published works ==
- Twelve Sonatas for Organ, Op. 1, published in London
- Six Sonatas for the Harpsichord with an accompaniment for a Violin, Op. 2, also published in London.

Many other works remain unpublished; the manuscripts are kept in the archive of the Cathedral of Forlì.

== Free scores ==
- Free scores by Ignazio Cirri at the International Music Score Library Project (IMSLP)

== Discs ==
- Ignazio Cirri, Dodici Sonate per l'Organo, played by Andrea Macinanti and Francesco Tasini; organs by Gaetano Callido in the Cathedral of Forlì, La Bottega Discantica, 1997.
- Ignazio Cirri, "Sei Sonate per clavicembalo con accompagnamento di violino", Ensemble Sezione Aurea, Luca Giardini violin, Filippo Pantieri harpsichord, Passacaille 2018.
