= Messa per Rossini =

Requiem Mass

- Requiem by 13 Italian composers including Giuseppe Verdi
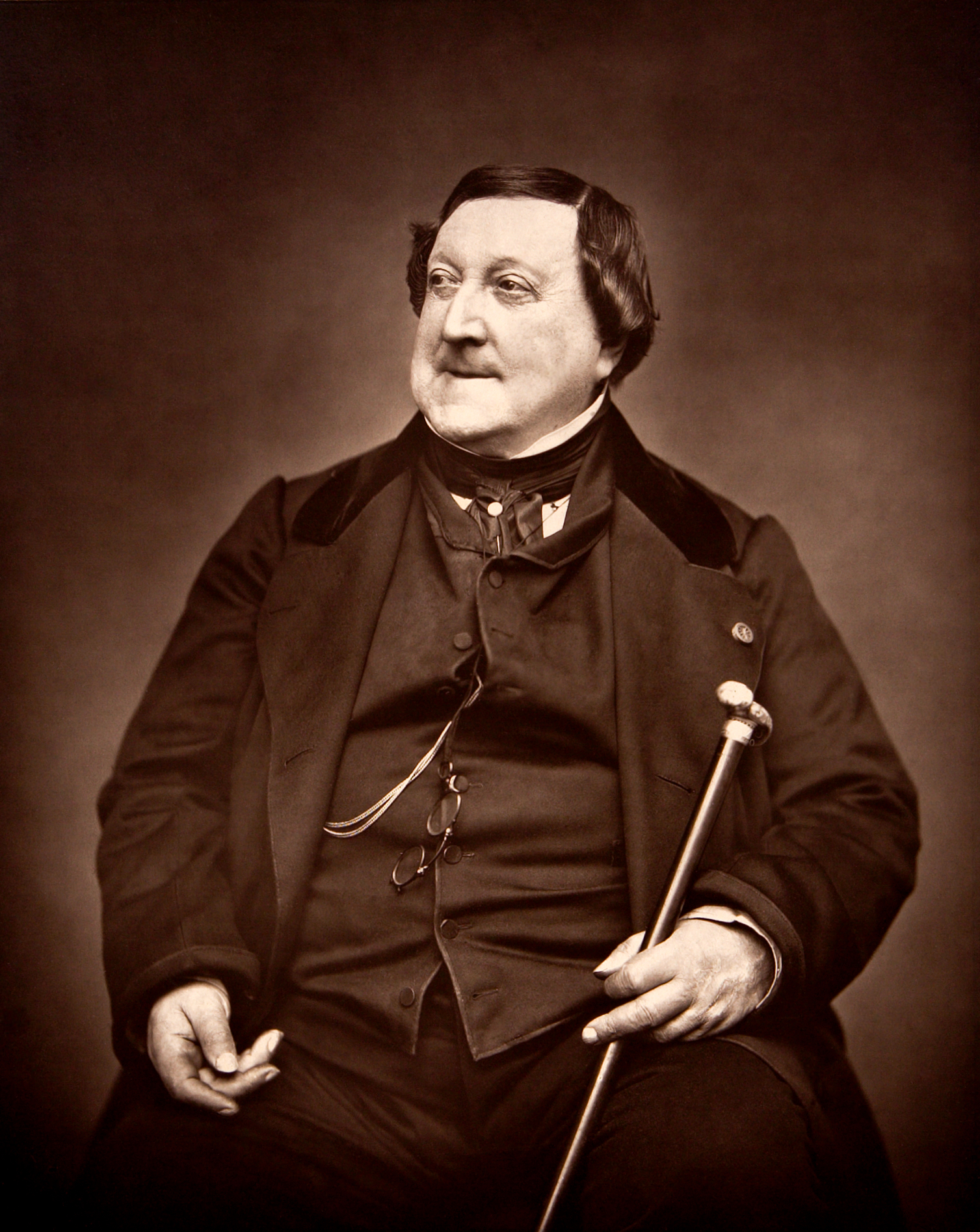
- Occasion: Anniversary of Rossini's death
- Text: Requiem
- Language: Latin
- Composed: 1869
- Performed: 1988
- Scoring: five soloists; chorus; orchestra

The Messa per Rossini is a Requiem Mass composed to commemorate the first anniversary of Gioachino Rossini's death. It was a collaboration among 13 Italian composers, initiated by Giuseppe Verdi. The composition was intended to be performed on 13 November 1869 in the Basilica of San Petronio, Bologna, where Rossini grew up and spent a large part of his life.

== Composition history ==
Verdi had proposed this collaboration in a letter from 17 November 1868, four days after Rossini's death, to his publisher at Casa Ricordi, Tito Ricordi (1811–1888), stating that after the performance, the manuscripts should be sealed in the archives of the Liceo musicale Rossini.

The city council of Bologna and the Accademia Filarmonica di Bologna received this idea favourably and a committee of three members (Lauro Rossi, Alberto Mazzucato, Stefano Ronchetti-Monteviti) of the Milan Conservatory was established in Milan with Giulio Ricordi as secretary. The committee chose the composers and assigned their tasks; Angelo Mariani agreed to conduct.

Mariani was also involved in Rossini commemorations in Pesaro, Rossini's birthplace, which were planned for August 1869. Despite Mariani's pleading invitation to Verdi on 19 August 1869, Verdi replied on the same day indignantly that he would not attend. In a letter from 24 August, Mariani expressed his distress at that response. Meanwhile, the committee had asked the impresario of the Teatro Comunale di Bologna, Luigi Scalaberni (1823–1876), to lend the performers, orchestra and chorus for the performance in Bologna on 13 November. Scalaberni refused on 6 October for commercial reasons because the performance of the mass would impede the success of his opera season. The municipal authorities then suggested to defer the commemorations until December, after the opera season. Verdi objected to such a delay and also to a suggestion by the committee to relocate the performance to Milan. In a letter from 27 October 1869 to Ricordi, Verdi rails against delay or relocation, and not only blames Mariani for the situation, but remarks: "Who would be the conductor at Milan? It cannot and must not be Mariani." The performance of the composition, which was finished by the summer of 1869, was then cancelled. The manuscript subsequently fell into oblivion.

Giuseppe Verdi adapted his own contribution, the concluding Libera me, as the basis for that section when composing his own Messa da Requiem.

== Performance history ==
The complete Messa per Rossini was discovered by American musicologist David Rosen in 1986 and premiered in 1988 by the Gächinger Kantorei conducted by Helmuth Rilling at the European Music Festival in Stuttgart and later at other festivals, such as the Rheingau Musik Festival in 2001. The first performance in the United States took place in October 1989 in New York at Avery Fisher Hall, also conducted by Rilling, with the soprano Gabriela Beňačková, the mezzo Florence Quivar, the tenor James Wagner, the baritone Jacob Will and the bass Brian Matthews, the Gächinger Kantorei and the New York Philharmonic. The work has subsequently been recorded on CD.

The first performance in France took place in 1998 at the Radio France-Montpellier Festival in Montpellier, under the direction of Enrique Diemecke, with the soprano Luana DeVol, the mezzo-soprano Phyllis Pancella, the tenor Rockwell Blake, the baritone Stefano Antonucci, the bass Felipe Bou, the Latvian Radio Choir and the Montpellier-Languedoc-Roussillon Philharmonic Orchestra. The first performance in the United Kingdom was given in 2003 at the Royal Academy of Music (London) by the Trinity Chorale and Trinity Orchestra, conducted by John Wyatt (Director of Music, Aldenham School).

In November 2017, Riccardo Chailly conducted this Requiem in concerts at the Teatro alla Scala in Milan. On 9 December 2017, after 148 years and a month, the Requiem was finally performed in the Basilica of San Petronio in Bologna, the place Giuseppe Verdi originally had in mind for this work. Organized and created by "Succede solo a Bologna APS", Lorenzo Bizzarri conducted the Cappella Musicale di Santa Maria dei Servi (orchestra and choir) and the Corale Quadriclavio, both from Bologna.

The first performance in Hungary takes place in November 2024 at the Müpa in Budapest, conducted by Henrik Nánási, with Réka Kristóf, Dorottya Láng, Giorgio Berrugi, Mihai Damian, Liang Li, and the Hungarian Radio Symphony Orchestra and Choir. At the Rossini Opera Festival, the Messa was performed for the first time, conducted by Donato Renzetti, on 22 August 2025.

== Scoring ==
- soloists: soprano, alto, tenor, baritone, bass
- mixed chorus (4 to 6 voices)
- orchestra: piccolo, 2 flutes, 2 oboes, English horn, 2 clarinets, bass clarinet, 4 bassoons, 4 horns, 4 trumpets, 3 trombones, ophicleide, 4 timpani, bass drum, cymbals, tam-tam, organ, strings (including divisi and solo)

== Structure of the work and contributors ==
Composer	Section	Movement	Setting
Antonio Buzzolla (1815–1871)	I. Introitus	Requiem e Kyrie	chorus
Antonio Bazzini (1818–1897)	II. Sequentia	1. Dies irae	chorus
Carlo Pedrotti (1817–1893)	II. Sequentia	2. Tuba mirum	solo (baritone) and chorus
Antonio Cagnoni (1828–1896)	II. Sequentia	3. Quid sum miser	duet: soprano, alto
Federico Ricci (1809–1877)	II. Sequentia	4. Recordare Jesu	quartet: soprano, alto, baritone, bass
Alessandro Nini (1805–1880)	II. Sequentia	5. Ingemisco	solo (tenor) and chorus
Raimondo Boucheron (1800–1876)	II. Sequentia	6. Confutatis; Oro supplex	solo (bass) and chorus
Carlo Coccia (1782–1873)	II. Sequentia	7. Lacrimosa; Amen	A Capella chorus and chorus
Gaetano Gaspari (1808–1881)	III. Offertorium	Domine Jesu; Quam olim Abrahae; Hostias; Quam olim Abrahae	quartet (soprano, alto, tenor, bass) and chorus
Pietro Platania (1828–1907)	IV. Sanctus	Sanctus; Hosanna; Benedictus; Hosanna	solo (soprano) and chorus
Lauro Rossi (1810–1885)	V. Agnus Dei	Agnus Dei	solo (alto)
Teodulo Mabellini (1817–1897)	VI. Communio	Lux aeterna	trio: tenor, baritone, bass
Giuseppe Verdi (1813–1901)	VII. Responsorium	Libera me Dies irae Requiem aeternam Libera me	solo (soprano) and chorus

== Recordings ==
Year	Orchestra, chorus, conductor	Soloists	Label, format: catalog no.	Notes
1989	Stuttgart Radio Symphony Orchestra, Gächinger Kantorei, Prague Philharmonic Choir, Helmuth Rilling	Gabriela Beňačková, Florence Quivar, James Wagner, Alexandru Agache, Aage Haugland	Hänssler classic, CD: 98.949, Kultur Films Inc., DVD: 4166	Studio recording made in September in Stuttgart
2017	Orchestra e Coro del Teatro alla Scala, Milano; Riccardo Chailly	María José Siri, Veronica Simeoni; Giorgio Berrugi; Simone Piazzola; Riccardo Zanellato	Decca Classics, CD (2): 4834084	Live recording made on 8–15 November at the Teatro alla Scala, Milan
