= Alberto Mazzucato =

Italian composer, music teacher, and writer (1813–1877)

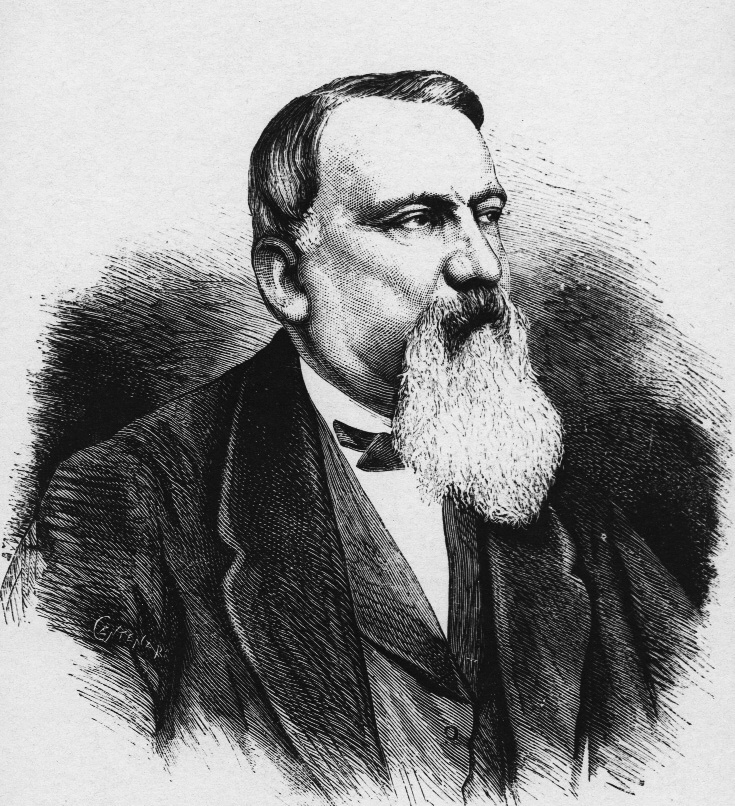
- Engraved portrait of Alberto Mazzucato, after a photograph by Giulio Rossi
- Born: 28 July 1813; Udine, Italy
- Died: 13 December 1877 (aged 64); Milan, Italy
- Occupation(s): Composer, music teacher, and writer
- Employer(s): Genoa Teatro Carlo Felice; Milan Conservatory
- Spouse: Teresa Bolza
- Relatives: Eliza Mazzucato Young

Alberto Mazzucato (28 July 1813 – 31 December 1877) was an Italian composer, music teacher, and writer.

Mazzucato was born in Udine. He trained at the Padua Conservatory and composed eight operas between 1834 and 1843, the most successful of which was Esmeralda (1838). He also contributed music to the pastiche La vergine di Kermo (1870) which also contained music by Carlo Pedrotti, Antonio Cagnoni, Federico Ricci, Amilcare Ponchielli, and Giovanni Pacini. Along with Luigi Felice Rossi and Guglielmo Quarenghi, he formed the Società di S Cecilia in 1860.

After his last opera, Hernani, premiered at the Teatro Carlo Felice in Genoa on 26 December 1843, Mazzucato retired from his work as a composer in order to focus on his career as an educator. He had been appointed to the staff of the Milan Conservatory in 1843, eventually becoming its Director in 1872. Among his notable pupils were music journalist Amintore Galli, composers Arrigo Boito, Benedetto Junck, Isidore de Lara, Antônio Carlos Gomes, and Ivan Zajc, sopranos Marcella Lotti della Santa and Marietta Gazzaniga, and tenor Sims Reeves. As a writer, he wrote articles for the Gazzetta musicale di Milano between 1845 and 1858. In 1859, he was appointed to the post of maestro direttore e concertatore at La Scala, a position he held until 1868. He died nine years later in Milan at the age of 64.

Alberto Mazzucato married Teresa Bolza, daughter of Count Luigi Bolza, Austrian police commissioner in Milan. Their daughter Eliza Mazzucato Young (1846-1937) was a composer, pianist, and music educator in the United States. Their son Giannandrea Mazzucato (1850-1900) was a music writer, librettist, and critic based in London.

== Operas ==
- La fidanzata di Lammermoor (1834)
- Don Chisciotte (1836)
- Esmeralda (1838)
- Coro dei penitenti (1838)
- I corsari (1840)
- I due sergenti (1841)
- Luigi V, re di Francia (1843)
- Hernani (1843)
- La vergine di Kermo (1870)
