= Accademia Filarmonica di Bologna =

Music education institution in Bologna, Italy

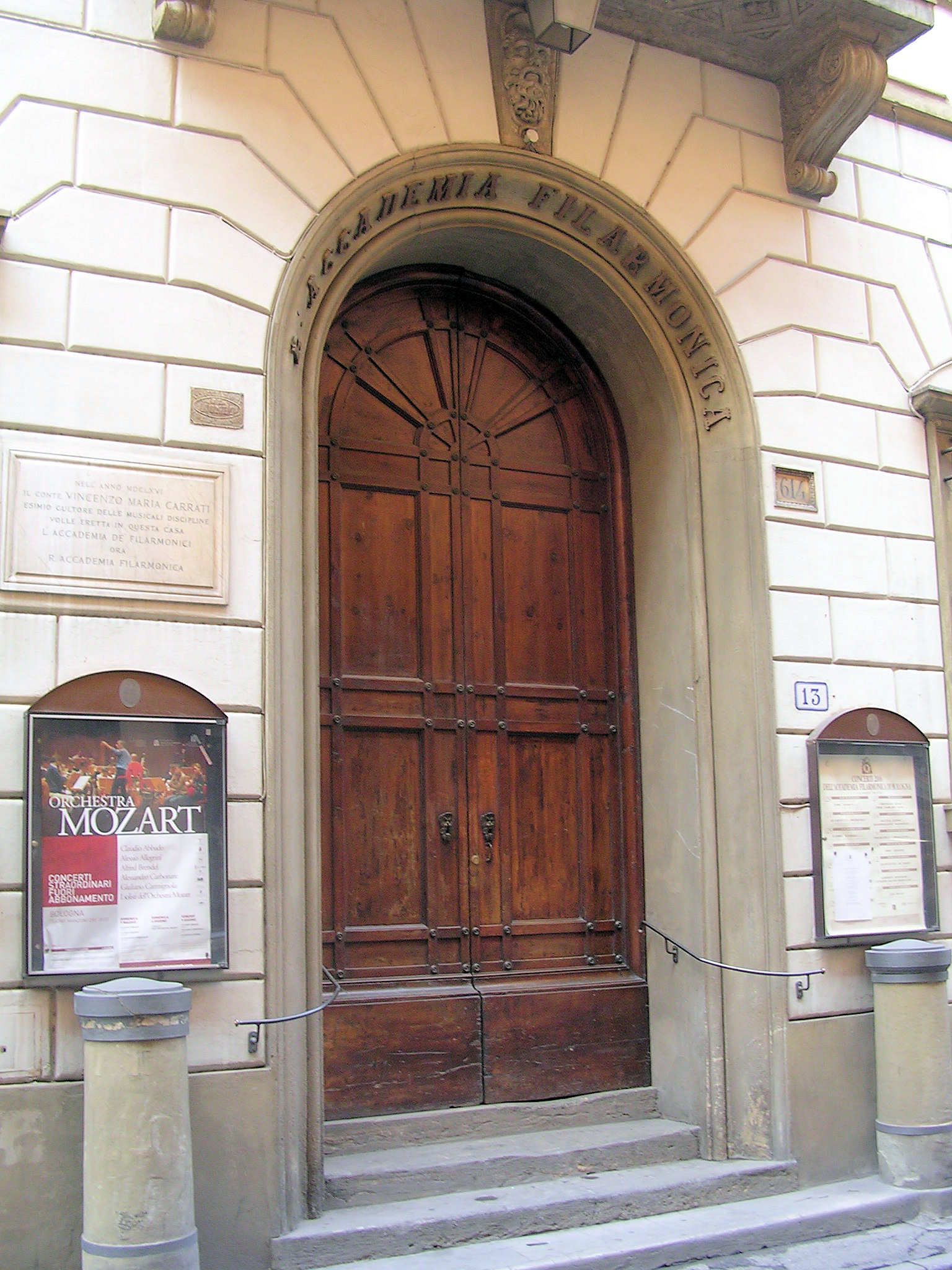
- The entrance to Palazzo Carrati, home of the Accademia
- Predecessor: Accademia dei Floridi (1615); Accademia dei Filomusi (1622); Accademia dei Filaschisi (1633)
- Formation: 1666; 360 years ago
- Type: cultural organisation
- Purpose: musical education
- Headquarters: Palazzo Carrati, via Guerrazzi 13
- Location: Bologna, Italy
- Coordinates: 44.4912°N 11.3511°E
- President: Loris Azzaroni
- Website: www.accademiafilarmonica.it
- Formerly called: Accademia de' Filarmonici; Liceo Filarmonico di Bologna; Regia Accademia Filarmonica di Bologna

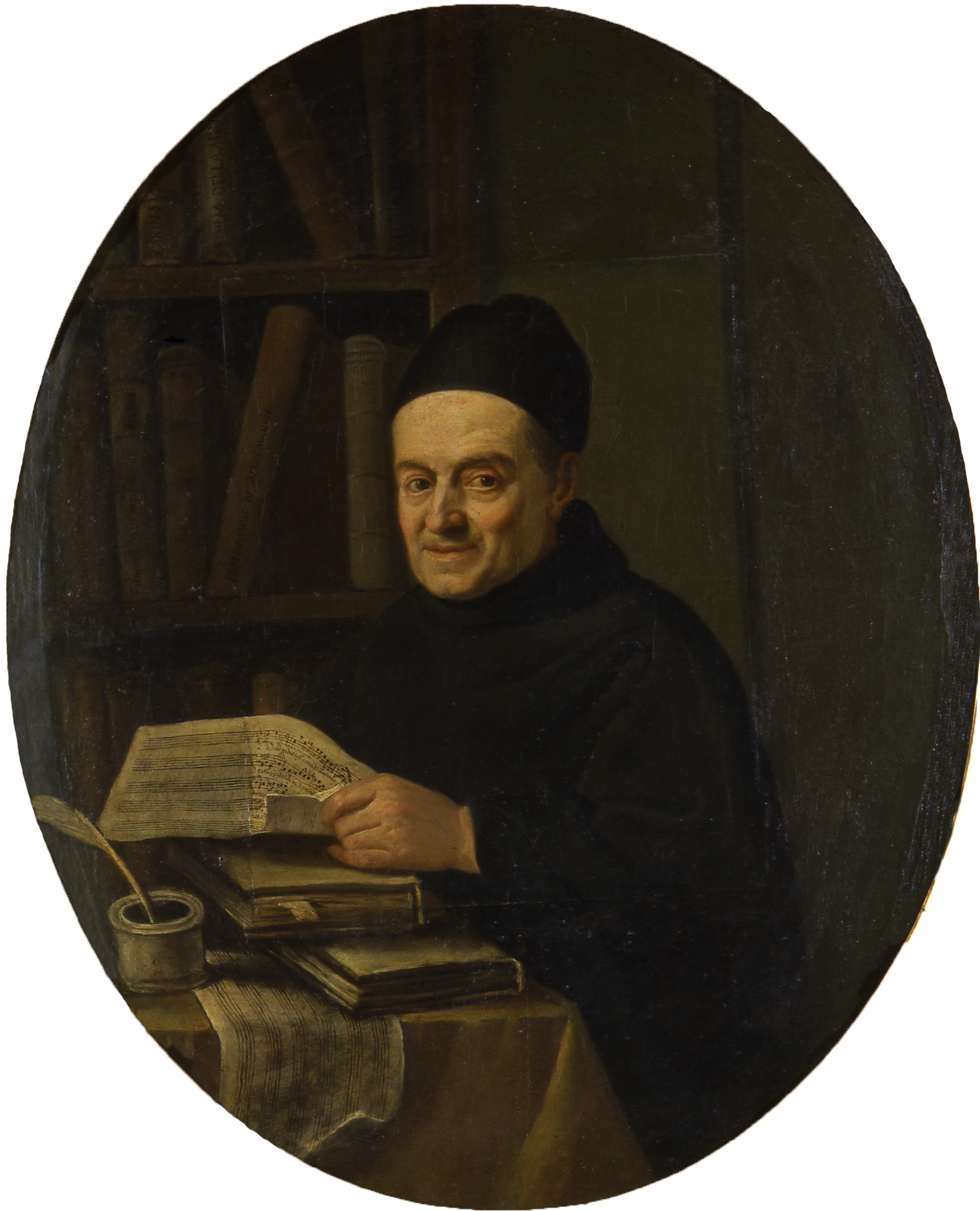
A. Crescimbeni – Portrait of Padre Martini Bologna, International museum and library of music

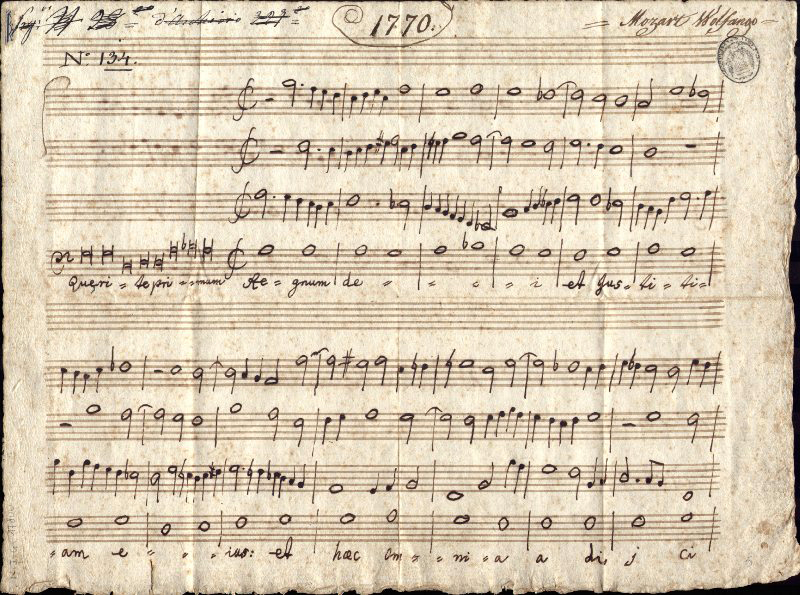
Antiphon "Quaerite primum regnum Dei" Examination exercise of Padre Martini's pupil 14-year-old Mozart, 9 October 1770, Bologna

Giovanni Battista Martini (1706-1784) - Quaerite primum regnum Dei à4 (1770)

Wolfgang Amadeus Mozart (1756–1791) - Quaerite primum regnum Dei à4, K.86 73v (1770)
Performed by Phillip W. Serna, Treble, Tenor & Bass Viols

The Accademia Filarmonica di Bologna ("philharmonic academy of Bologna"; sometimes known in English as the Bologna Academy of Music) is a music education institution in Bologna, Italy.

The Accademia de' Filarmonici was founded as an association of musicians in Bologna in 1666 by Vincenzo Maria Carrati. Saint Anthony of Padua was chosen as the patron saint, and an organ with the motto Unitate melos as the emblem. Through the influence of Pietro Ottoboni, the statute of the academy was approved by Clement XI in 1716. In 1749 the Benedict XIV decreed that the Accademia could award the title of Maestro di cappella.

Among the early members of the academy were Giovanni Paolo Colonna (one of the founders of 1666), Carlo Donato Cossoni, Arcangelo Corelli (1670), Giacomo Antonio Perti (1688), Giuseppe Maria Jacchini (1688), Giuseppe Maria Orlandini, Antonio Maria Bernacchi (1722), Giovanni Carestini (1726) and the celebrated castrato singer Carlo Farinelli (1730).

The composer and teacher Giovanni Battista Martini taught at the Accademia from 1758; his pupils included André Ernest Modeste Grétry, Josef Mysliveček, Maksym Berezovsky, Stanislao Mattei (who succeeded Martini as teacher of composition), Johann Christian Bach, the noted cellist Giovanni Battista Cirri and, in 1770, Wolfgang Amadeus Mozart.

In the 19th and 20th centuries the institution was interlaced with such names as Gioacchino Rossini, Giuseppe Verdi, Arrigo Boito, Richard Wagner, Jules Massenet, Camille Saint-Saëns, Giacomo Puccini, and also with John Field, Franz Liszt, Johannes Brahms, Anton Rubinstein, Ferruccio Busoni and Ottorino Respighi.
