= Tutti in maschera =

Opera by Carlo Pedrotti

- Opera by Carlo Pedrotti
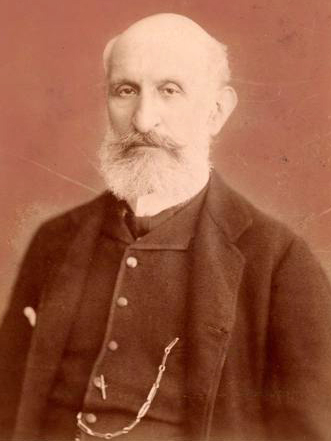
- The composer photographed in 1882
- Translation: Everyone in Disguise
- Librettist: Marco Marcelliano Marcello
- Language: Italian
- Based on: L'impresario delle Smirne by Carlo Goldoni
- Premiere: 4 November 1856; Teatro Nuovo, Verona

Tutti in maschera (Everyone in Disguise) is an opera (called a commedia lirica) by Carlo Pedrotti. The libretto is by Marco Marcelliano Marcello, based on the 1759 comedy L'impresario delle Smirne by Carlo Goldoni. It was premiered at the Teatro Nuovo, Verona, on 4 November 1856.

== Background and performance history ==
Tutti in maschera was the twelfth of Pedrotti's eighteen operas and the tenth to be staged (the first two were never performed). Five of the previous eleven were opere serie (serious operas) and five were opere semiserie (operas combining drama and comedy). Only one, the one-act Il parrucchiere della reggenza (The hairdresser of the Regency) of 1852 was designated as a comic opera.

After the premiere, Tutti in maschera was seen in Italy at the Teatro Regio di Parma in 1859, the Teatro Comunale di Bologna in 1860, the Teatro della Canobbiana in 1860 (with the famous baritone Antonio Cotogni as Abdalà) and the Teatro Comunale, Catania in 1871. It was also performed in Vienna (1865) and, in French as Les masques, at the Théâtre de l'Athénée on the rue Scribe in Paris in 1869. Its success in Italy also saw it spread to countries where Italian singers and companies dominated; hence it was premiered in Calcutta in 1867, Australia in 1874 and New Zealand in 1875. It was popular within Italy until the end of the nineteenth century, when it began to gradually fall out of favour and, until a recent co-production between theatres in Savona, Piacenza and Rovigo and Wexford Festival Opera in 2007–08, was last heard in Italy in 1932 or in 1935.

In Britain, the John Lewis Partnership Music Society performed the opera, conducted by Derek Carden, at the Royal College of Music's Britten Theatre in London in 1991.

== Roles ==
Role	Voice type	Premiere Cast, November 4, 1856 (Conductor: Carlo Pedrotti).
Vittoria, a prima donna	soprano	Laura Ruggero Antonioli
Emilio, her lover	tenor	Giovanni Petrovich
Don Gregorio, a music-teacher	bass	Pietro Mattioli-Alessandrini
Dorotea, his wife, another prima donna	mezzo-soprano	Adele Ruggero
Martello, a poet	bass	Luigi Bisi
Abdalà, a rich merchant from Damascus	baritone	Davide Squarcia
Lisetta, Emilio's maid	soprano	Antonietta Scotti
actors, singers, masked-ballgoers

== Synopsis ==
Place: Venice
Time: 1780

=== Act 1 ===
Scene 1: A cafe

Singers and actors complain about the previous evening's failure of Gregorio's most recent opera production. Emilio and Vittoria are attracted to each other, and he takes her handkerchief. Gregorio arrives and is subjected to ridicule, but he brings news of a rich Turk (Abdalà) who is interested in taking the company to the East and paying all their expenses. Naturally, everyone wants to be introduced to him.

Scene 2: Emilio's house

Dorotea finds that Emilio, her former lover, is not at home, and searches for the love-letters that she had sent to him. She hides when Vittoria is admitted. The latter is pleased to see the handkerchief that Emilio took, and when he arrives they declare their love. Gregorio is heard, and Vittoria also tries to hide - but she inadvertently picks Dorotea's hiding-place, and the discovery results in a slanging-match involving all four.

=== Act 2 ===
Scene 1: An ante-room in a hotel

The members of the troupe eagerly anticipate Abdalà's arrival, and, when he appears, they are eager to curry favour with him. He is attracted only to Vittoria, and when he proposes a private meeting, she accepts in order to annoy Emilio.

Scene 2: Abdalà's suite

Vittoria is worried that the invitation to a masked ball at La Fenice which Abdalà has sent her (with instructions specifying what she should wear) might compromise her. He assures her that his only wish is to engage her for his touring company. Suddenly, Dorotea and the rest of the troupe arrive, and Vittoria accidentally mislays the invitation, on which her name does not appear. Gregorio finds it and suspects that it was sent to Dorotea. Vittoria promises Abdalà that she will come to the ball if he does not say anything about the invitation. His response is to invite everyone to the ball, and he promises contracts to all.

=== Act 3 ===
The masked ball at La Fenice

Everyone is in disguise - Vittoria as a flower-seller, Dorotea in the costume that Abdalà specified for Vittoria, and both Gregorio and Emilio are dressed as Abdalà. After a lot of confusion, everything is sorted out and Abdalà distributes contracts to the whole troupe, but Vittoria and Emilio opt to stay in Venice to cement their relationship.

== Recording ==
Pedrotti: Tutti in maschera, Orchestra Sinfonica di Sanremo e Della Liguria

- Conductor: Giovanni Di Stefano
- Principal singers: Massimiliano Viapiano (Baritone), Anna Gemmabella (Mezzo Soprano), Domenico Colaianni (Baritone), Yolanda Auyanet (Soprano), David Sotgiu (Tenor), Paolo Bordogna (Baritone)
- Coro del Teatro dell'Opera Giocosa
- Release Date: 2009-01-08
- Label: Bongiovanni
- Catalog No: BGV 20011
- Format: DVD-Video
- Number of Discs: 1
- UPC: 675754013264
