= Benedetto Junck =

Italian composer

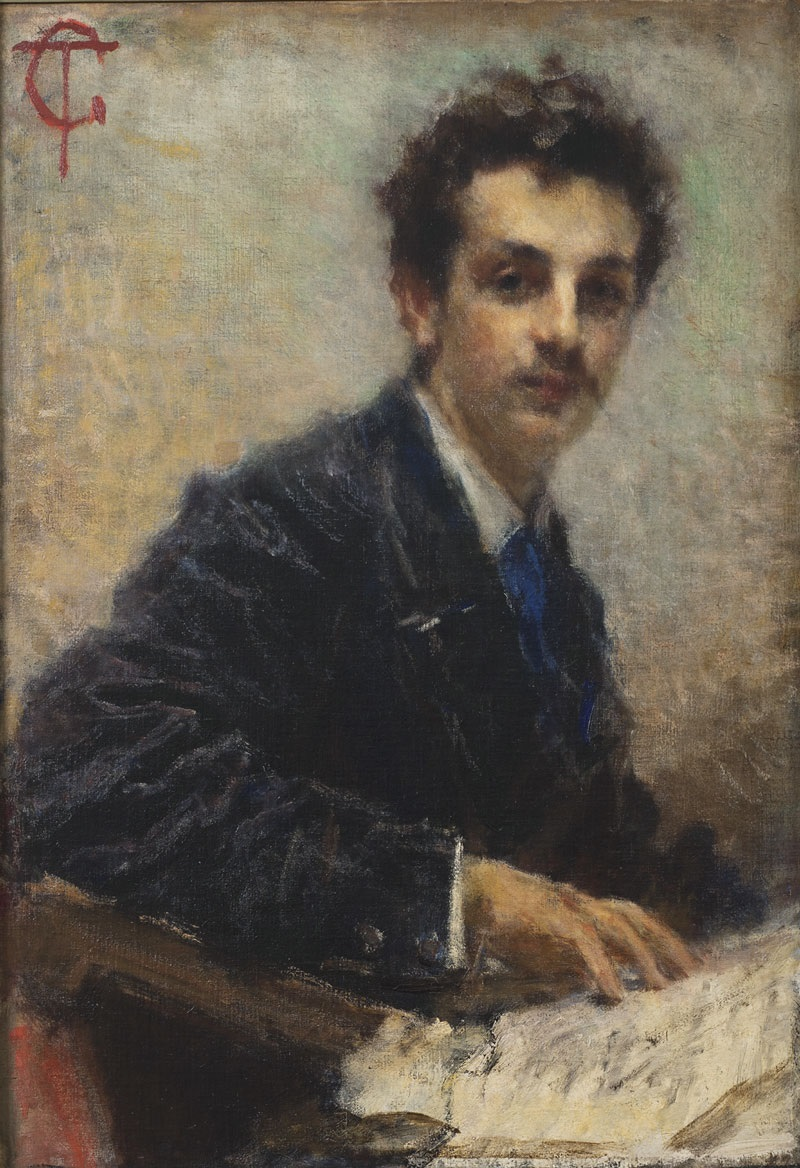
Portrait of Benedetto Junck by Tranquillo Cremona, 1874

Benedetto Junck (21/25 August 1852 – 3 October 1903) was an Italian composer, the son of an Italian woman and an Alsatian father. Born in Turin, he was trained there for a career in business, and began work in that line in Paris before turning to music. He studied with Alberto Mazzucato and Antonio Bazzini. Much of his output was chamber music; he also composed a few songs and romanze.
