= Mattheus Le Maistre =

Flemish Renaissance choirmaster and composer

Matthaeus Le Maistre
- Born: circa 1505; Roclenge-sur-Geer, Liège
- Died: 1577; Dresden
- Occupations: Composer, choirmaster

Mattheus Le Maistre or Matthaeus Le Maistre (c. 1505–1577) was a Flemish Renaissance choirmaster and composer who is best known for his time in Dresden. His music was superior but in no way progressive, influential in both Counter-Reformation and Lutheran courts.

== Biography ==
=== Early life and employment ===
Born circa 1505 in Roclenge-sur-Geer, in the Prince-Bishopric of Liège in the Low Countries, and he considered himself a "Belgian" throughout his lifetime. Musical education was little valued in his house, yet he studied music from his early childhood Nothing is known regarding the identity of his musical instructors. It is speculated that, prior to his time in Munich, he worked in Leipzig because his name appears in music directories there. In 1550 Le Maistre was employed at the Bayerische Hofkapelle in Munich as a composer, in no small part because of the importance imparted to music by the newly-ascended Albrecht V, Duke of Bavaria. As such he was the first in a line of foreign musicians employed at the Bayerischer Hofkapelle. Later in Munich he became choirmaster at the court chapel of St. George, where he was a successor to Ludwig Senfl. Here he introduced Propers for the weekdays.

=== Dresden ===
He left Munich in 1554 to assume choirmaster duties in the autumn at the Staatskapelle Dresden, succeeding Johann Walter. This orchestra consisted of a minimum of 40 musicians. Duties included composing and arranging music for sacred and secular functions, providing for the musical instruction of choirboys, in addition to preparing the choir and conducting its performances. His income for this position was 240 gulden, plus reimbursement for expenses incurred while educating and otherwise overseeing the well-being of the choirboys. Additional perks of the position included one new uniform each year, plus free food upon the occasions of a court banquet. He seems to have maintained his ties to his hometown district of Liège, as he imported at least one choirboy from there upon the year of his placement in Dresden. In Dresden he converted from Catholicism to Protestantism, an action which caused him to lose the patrimony of his old home.

=== Health, retirement and death ===
Le Maistre requested retirement and a pension in 1565 because of developing health issues involving gout and an accident at the Torgau church. The request for retirement was not granted but he was rewarded with a life stipend in compensation for the lost patrimony suffered upon his conversion. Perhaps recognizing Le Maistre's diminished capacity, in 1566 Antonio Scandello became his assistant, and after Le Maistre left the position in 1567 it was Scandello who succeeded him in 1568. In addition to his regular appointments, Le Maistre earned additional money with compositions dedicated to authorities in Zwickau. Scandello took over his duties in the early part of 1568, and Le Maistre formally retired on 24 June 1568 in some part because of illness. At that time he was given a pension of 195 florins, and although officially retired he retained the title of Kapellmeister and remained at the Saxon court until his death. His last confirmed action is the forward he wrote to his last published work, this taking place in January 1577. This work, dedicated to his young singers, is preceded with a poem written in Latin where he proceeds to describe himself as "an old man with a white head, whose power fades." He died in Dresden in January 1577.

=== Identity ===
Because so little is known about Le Maistre's early history, there has been difficulty positively identifying him. He has been equated to Matthias Werrecore (also known as Matthias Hermann Fiammengo), but this identification was proven false. Of positive identification is his additional identity as Matheus Nidlender. In Dresden he signed his name Matthaeo Le Meistre.

=== Family ===
Mattheus Le Maistre had at least one son, Valerian, who was also a musician.

== Style ==
Le Maistre is a stylistic link between Senfl and Lassus. His works are based on the Renaissance notion of music as "ars". Le Maistre believed music played an important role for the human spirit, and that as such music was created for a divine purpose. It therefore follows that his writings have been described as both humanistic and pedagogic. He was a conservative composer, and as such his works were not appreciated during the composer's life as they were considered out-of-date. Even his motets pointed to the past, musically, rather than developing new ground. His style is a synthesis of the traditional techniques of imitation, canon and cantus firmus, and thereby appear to point backwards. Nevertheless, the importance of this composer is demonstrated by the facts that he began a long tradition of foreign musicians at the Bayerischer Hofkappelle, his compositions were in service for more than 20 years after his death, and further served as role models to the development of future instrumental music.

The music held by the court in Munich is solidly Catholic in nature. Upon his conversion to Protestantism, he became highly influenced by Walter and Georg Rhau. His commitment to the new faith is particularly demonstrated by the mass setting "Ich Weiss mir ein fest gebauetz Haus" in which he defines the song "O du Lamm Gottes" as a cantus firmus based in the "Qui tollis." It was in this setting that Le Maistre made his first significant contribution to the Protestant Mass.

Le Maistre's compositions are superior musically and intellectually. They are highly influenced by music from post-1500 Netherlands, and the greater number are solidly in the cantus-firmus style. He deftly combines the styles of parody and cantus-firmus. Many of his compositions are based on the spiritual phrasing of Rhau, creating complex motets with virtuoso cantus-firmus treatment from simple strophic material. His songs are in the tradition of the German partsong, influenced by the Renaissance madrigal.

He was among the early composers to write chorales with the melody defined in the treble, writing in this manner as early as 1566.

== Legacy and influence ==
He was considered by Hermann Finck to be one of the most outstanding musicians of his time. His compositions were in use more than 20 years after his death, and they served as role models to subsequent instrumental works. Le Maistre became significant to liturgical music in counter-reformation Bavaria in spite of his later Protestant career. Currently it is his German songs, both sacred and secular, which are considered his most significant accomplishments.

== Works ==
Among his works are masses and motets written in Latin, and part-songs, both religious and secular, which are written in either Latin or German. His pre-Dresden compositions were not published, they exist in manuscript form, and that as a single copy with the exception of the mass "Praeter rerum serieum" which is the first known mass setting for that text. More than two-dozen of these manuscripts survive in various archives, with the highest concentration in the collection of the Bavarian State Library.

Between the years 1554 and 1568, several of his compositions not included in the below listing were included in published compilations.

=== List of published works ===
- "Battaglia Taliana" printed in Venice, 1552.
- "Magnificat octo tonorum" printed in Dresden, 1557.
- "Catechesis numeris musicis inclusa 3v" printed in Nuremberg, 1559 and 1563. This three-part setting of Luther's Small Catechism includes no bass voice. Its purpose was instructional, and demonstrates Le Maistre's devotion to the new church teaching.
- "Geistliche und weltliche Teusche Geseng" printed in Wittenberg, 1566.
- "Liber primus sacrarum cantionem" printed in Dresden, 1570.
- "Schöne und auserlesene deudsche und lateinische geistliche gesenge auss 2 St.” printed in 1577.

== Bibliography ==
- Bernstein, Jane A. (1998). Music Printing in Renaissance Venice: The Scotto Press (1539–1572). Oxford University Press. ISBN 978-0-19-510231-4.
- Blume, Friedrich; Finscher, Ludwig, eds. (1967). Die Musik in Geschichte und Gegenwart (in German). Vol. 10 (2 ed.). Basel: Bärenreiter Kassel. ISBN 3-7618-1120-9.
- Bossuyt, Ignace, ed. (2008). Cui Dono Lepidum Novum Libellum?. Leuven University Press. ISBN 9789058676696.
- Crook, David (2014). Orlando Di Lasso's Imitation Magnificats for Counter-Reformation Munich. Princeton University Press. ISBN 978-1-4008-6378-5.
- Fisher, Alexander J. (2014). Music, Piety, and Propaganda: The Soundscape of Counter-Reformation Bavaria. Oxford University Press. ISBN 978-0-19-976464-8.
- Gresch, Donald, ed. (1982). Mattheus Le Maistre: Catechesis Numeris Musicis Inclusa and Schöne und Auserlesene Deudsche und Lateinische Geistliche Gesenge. Madison, Wisconsin: A-R Editions, Inc. ISBN 0-89579-160-9.
- Kade, Otto (1862). Mattheus Le Maistre – Niederländischer Tonsetzer und Churfürstlich Sächsischer Kapellmeister (in German). Mainz: B. Schott's Söhne.
- Pratt, Waldo Selden (1907). The History of Music. New York: G. Schirmer, Inc.
- Randel, Don Michael, ed. (1996). The Harvard Biographical Dictionary of Music. Harvard University Press. p. 496. ISBN 978-0-674-37299-3. "Matthaeus Le Maistree."
- Sadie, Stanley; Tyrrell, John, eds. (2001). The New Grove Dictionary of Music and Musicians. Vol. 14 (2 ed.). New York: Grove's Dictionaries, Inc. ISBN 1-56159-239-0.
- Westrup, Jack Allan (1968). New Oxford History of Music: The Age of Humanism, 1540–1630. Oxford University Press.
