= Carlo Donato Cossoni =

Italian composer

Carlo Donato Cossoni (born Gravedona; 10 November 1623 – 8 February 1700) was an Italian composer and organist.

From 1662 to 1670, he was first organist of San Petronio Bologna and in 1666, one of the founder members of the Bolognese Accademia Filarmonica di Bologna. He was maestro di cappella in Milan Cathedral 1684–1692. A thematic catolgue of his works was published by Claudio Bacciagaluppi and Luigi Collarile in 2009.

== Works ==
- Il Sacrificio d'Abramo
