= Guglielmo Quarenghi =

Italian composer and cellist

Guglielmo Quarenghi (October 22, 1826 – February 3, 1882) was an Italian composer and cellist.

== Life and career ==
Guglielmo Quarenghi was born in Casalmaggiore, Italy on October 22, 1826. From 1839 to 1842 he studied with Vincenzo Merighi at the Milan Conservatory. In 1850, he became the principal cellist at La Scala, and in 1851 a professor at the conservatory. Along with Luigi Felice Rossi and Alberto Mazzucato, Quarenghi formed the Società di S Cecilia in 1860. In 1879, he succeeded Raimondo Boucheron as maestro di cappella of Milan Cathedral. He resigned two years later due to ill health and died in Milan on February 3, 1882.

Quarenghi composed mostly music for the cello including six caprices for solo cello, several original pieces and transcriptions for cello and piano, and some chamber music. He did write one opera, Il dì di San Michele, which was produced in Milan in 1863. That same year he published a mass and other church music. His Metodo di violoncello (Milan, 1876) has an interesting preface, comparing the earliest bowed instruments, and their evolution, with folk instruments from many countries.

He taught his teacher's son, Cristoforo Merighi at an unknown time period.

== Sources ==
- Lynda MacGregor. The New Grove Dictionary of Opera, edited by Stanley Sadie (1992), ISBN 0-333-73432-7 and ISBN 1-56159-228-5
