= Battaglia (music) =

A battaglia is a form of Renaissance and Baroque programme music imitating a battle. The Renaissance form is typically in the form of a madrigal for four or more voices where cannons, fanfares, cries, drum rolls, and other noises of a battle are imitated by voices. The Baroque form is more often an instrumental depiction of a battle.

== Vocal battaglia works ==
- Janequin La Guerre or 'La Bataille' - chanson written to commemorate the Battle of Marignano in 1515, first printed in 1529,
- Matthias Werrecore La Battaglia Taliana or Die Schlacht vor Pavia 1544, for 4 voices - after the Battle of Pavia 1525.
- Orazio Vecchi Battaglia d'Amor e Dispetto - an extended madrigal dialogue - allegorical and not related to any battle. But closer to the original battaglia genre than Monteverdi's amor versus guerra, contrasts in that composer's 8th Book of Madrigals.
- Mateo Flecha La Guerra - an ensalada (music) in Spanish
- Claudio Monteverdi Il combattimento di Tancredi e Clorinda (1624)

== Instrumental battaglia works ==
- Andrea Gabrieli Battaglia à 8 per strumenti da fiato
- William Byrd "The Battell", for keyboard
- Annibale Padovano Battaglia à 8 per strumenti da fiato
- Heinrich Biber: Battalia à 10 for solo violin, strings, and continuo

== Later battle music not called battaglia ==
- Franz Christoph Neubauer: Sinfonie 'La Bataille' - Battle of Focșani 1789
- Beethoven: Wellington's Victory - requiring muskets and cannons. To be contrasted with Haydn's tribute Battle of the Nile which does not sonically attempt to depict the battle.
- Tchaikovsky: 1812 Ouverture
- Prokofiev: Battle on the ice from Alexander Nevsky - Battle of Lake Peipus, 1242
- Shostakovich: first movement of Leningrad Symphony, despite Shostakovich's disclaimers,
- Kurpiński: The Battle of Mozhaisk, also known as Grand Symphony Imagining a Battle.
