= Antonio Scandello =

Italian composer

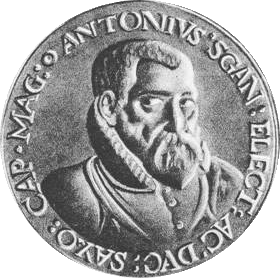

Antonio Scandello (January 17, 1517 – January 18, 1580) was an Italian composer, born in Bergamo. He worked as musician at the court of the Electors of Saxony in Dresden. In 1549 he became court-bandmaster, and in 1568 Kapellmeister succeeding Mattheus Le Maistre. His music combines elements of the Italian Renaissance with German musical traditions.

Scandello composed a memorial mass for the Saxon Elector Maurice (Missa super Epithaphum Mauritii), who had been wounded to death at the battle of Sievershausen. The mass is based on a motet on the Latin epitaph of Maurice by the headmaster Georg Fabricius of the Misnian princely school. It was conducted at the burial of the Elector in the Freiberg minster in 1562.

Scandello died in 1580 in Dresden.

== Music sample ==
- Bona sera, come stai cor mio
