= National Training School for Music =

The National Training School for Music, sometimes given as the National Training School of Music, was a music conservatory located in Kensington, London, England. Established in 1873 and opened in 1876, the school's first principal was Arthur Sullivan. He was succeeded by John Stainer in 1881. In 1882 the school was absorbed into the newly created Royal College of Music which began instructing students in 1883.

== History ==
Founded in 1873, the idea for the National Training School of Music (NTSM) was initially proposed by the Prince Consort who envisioned a school that would provide free musical training to winners of scholarships across the United Kingdom. After a three-year period of acquiring facilities, faculty, resources, the school opened in 1876, with Arthur Sullivan as its principal. Conservatoires to train young students for a musical career had been set up in major European cities, but in London the long-established Royal Academy of Music had not supplied suitable training for professional musicians: in 1870 it was estimated that fewer than ten percent of instrumentalists in London orchestras had studied at the academy. The NTSM's aim, summarised in its founding charter, was:

To establish for the United Kingdom such a School of Music as already exists in many of the principal Continental countries, – a School which shall take rank with the Conservatories of Milan, Paris, Vienna, Leipsic, Brussels, and Berlin, – a School which shall do for the musical youth of Great Britain what those Schools are doing for the talented youth of Italy, Austria, France, Germany, and Belgium.

The school was housed in a new building in Kensington Gore, opposite the west side of the Royal Albert Hall. The building was not large, having only 18 practice rooms and no concert hall. In a 2005 study of the NTSM and its replacement by the RCM, David Wright observes that the building is "more suggestive of a young ladies' finishing school than a place for the serious training of professional musicians".

Under Sullivan, a reluctant and ineffectual principal, the NTSM failed to provide a satisfactory alternative to the Royal Academy and, by 1880, a committee of examiners comprising Charles Hallé, Sir Julius Benedict, Sir Michael Costa, Henry Leslie and Otto Goldschmidt reported that the school lacked "executive cohesion". The following year Sullivan resigned and was replaced by John Stainer. In his 2005 study of the NTSM, Wright comments:

Like the RAM at that time, the NTSM simply failed to relate its teaching to professional need and so did not discriminate between the education required to turn out professional instrumentalists/singers and amateur/ social musicians; nor between elementary and advanced teachers. And because its purpose was unclear, so was its provision.

Even before the 1880 report, it had become clear that the NTSM would not fulfil the role of national music conservatoire. As early as 13 July 1878, a meeting was held at Marlborough House, London, under the presidency of the Prince of Wales, "for the purpose of taking into consideration the advancement of the art of music and establishing a college of music on a permanent and more extended basis than that of any existing institution". The original plan was to merge the Royal Academy of Music and the NTSM into a single, enhanced organisation. The NTSM agreed, but after prolonged negotiations, the Royal Academy refused to enter into the proposed scheme.

In 1881, with George Grove as a leading instigator and with the support of the Prince of Wales, a draft charter was drawn up for a successor body to the NTSM. The Royal College of Music occupied the premises previously home to the NTSM and opened there on 7 May 1883. Grove was appointed its first director. There were 50 scholars elected by competition and 42 fee-paying students.

== Alumni ==
- Walter Alcock
- Frederic Cliffe
- Eugen d'Albert
- Florence Maud Ewart
- Frederic King
- Clara Ross

== Faculty ==
- John Francis Barnett
- Frederick Bridge
- John Tiplady Carrodus
- Eaton Faning
- Stephen Kemp
- William Henry Monk
- Ernst Pauer
- Ebenezer Prout
- Franklin Taylor
- Albert Visetti
- Eliza Mazzucato Young
