= Giulio Rossi (bishop of Pescia) =

Most Reverend Giulio Rossi
- Bishop of Pescia
- Church: Catholic Church
- Diocese: Diocese of Pescia
- In office: 1804–1833
- Predecessor: Francesco Vincenti
- Successor: Giovanni Battista Rossi

Orders
- Ordination: 20 Sep 1777
- Consecration: 4 Nov 1804 by Giulio Maria della Somaglia

Personal details
- Born: 4 Jul 1754 Pistoia, Italy
- Died: 2 Feb 1833 (age 78) Pescia, Italy

Bishop Giulio Rossi (4 Jul 1754 – 2 Feb 1833) was a Roman Catholic prelate who served as Bishop of Pescia (1804–1833).

== Biography ==
Giulio Rossi was born on 4 Jul 1754 in Pistoia, Italy and ordained a priest on 20 Sep 1777. On 29 Oct 1804, he was appointed during the papacy of Pope Pius VII as Bishop of Pescia. On 4 Nov 1804, he was consecrated bishop by Giulio Maria della Somaglia, Cardinal-Priest of Santa Maria sopra Minerva, with Ottavio Boni, Titular Archbishop of Nazianzus, and Benedetto Sinibaldi, Titular Archbishop of Ephesus, serving as co-consecrators. He served as Bishop of Pescia until his death on 2 Feb 1833.

Catholic Church titles
Preceded by Francesco Vincenti	Bishop of Pescia; 1804–1833	Succeeded by Giovanni Battista Rossi
