= Raimondo Boucheron =

Italian composer (1800–1876)

Raimondo Boucheron (March 15, 1800 – February 28, 1876) was an Italian composer, chiefly of sacred music. During his life, he was known primarily for the song "Inno per le cinque giornate". Today he is remembered as one of the contributors to the Messa per Rossini, for which he wrote the Confutatis and Oro supplex of the Sequentia. He also served for a time as maestro di cappella of Milan Cathedral, being succeeded in the post by Guglielmo Quarenghi.
