= Marco Marcelliano Marcello =

Italian composer

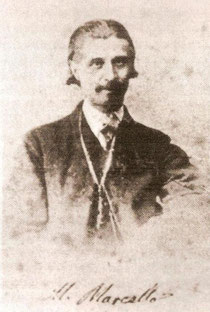
- Born: Michele Marco Marcelliano Marcello; 7 March 1818; San Giovanni Lupatoto, Austrian Empire
- Died: 23 July 1865 (aged 47); Milan, Italy
- Occupations: writer and composer

Marco Marcelliano Marcello (7 March 1818 – 23 July 1865) was an Italian writer and composer. He was particularly known for the opera libretti he wrote for the Italian composers Achille Peri, Carlo Pedrotti, and Antonio Cagnoni as well as his translations of French operas for their first performances in Italy, including Meyerbeer's L'Africaine.

== Biography ==
Marcello was born in San Giovanni Lupatoto, a small town near Verona then in the Austrian Empire. He showed an early talent for music and poetry and at the age of 16 composed his first opera. His family sent him to Novara where he studied music and composition under Saverio Mercadante. He then followed Mercadante to Naples where he continued his studies in singing and composition and joined the circle of young writers around the writer and librettist Giovanni Emanuele Bidera. During that time, he composed two operas which were never performed. He also began working as a translator and librettist. He produced two librettos for operas by Carlo Pedrotti composed when Pedrotti was a student, Antigone and La sposa del villaggio, neither of which was ever performed. However, Pedrotti's Lina, again with a libretto by Marcello, premiered in Verona in 1840 to a favourable reception by both the audience and the critics. In 1839, Marcello had also completed the libretto for Mercadante's opera Il bravo when the original librettist, Gaetano Rossi, fell ill.

His activities in the next few years included writing the libretto for Luigi Petrali's opera Sofonisba which premiered at La Scala in 1844 and translating the libretto of Halévy's opera La Juive into Italian, part of which was performed at the Teatro Regio di Parma in 1845. He left Naples during the 1848 uprisings and returned to Northern Italy. He spent some time in a villa on Lake Garda and then settled in Turin. He taught singing and piano there, and wrote music criticism for the journal Rivista contemporanea. In 1854 he also founded the journal, Il trovatore.

In October 1859, after the French-Piedmontese troops had secured the city, Marcello moved to Milan where he spent the rest of his life. The 1850s and 60s saw the premieres of multiple operas with librettos by Marcello, including four more by Pedrotti, Achille Peri's Giuditta, and Filippo Marchetti's opera Romeo e Giulietta based on Shakespeare's Romeo and Juliet. Unusually for Italian Romeo and Juliet operas, Marcello based the libretto's structure and narrative closely on Shakespeare's play rather than on the source narratives that had inspired the play. In 1865 Marcello's Italian translation of Meyerbeer's L'Africaine was heard throughout Italy and in London's Royal Opera House.

In the early 1840s Marcello had become seriously ill and was told that he had hypertrophy of the heart from which he would not recover. A friend then introduced him to the Swiss physician Jacques Etienne Chevalley de Rivaz who had practices in Naples and the island of Ischia where he owned a spa at Casamicciola. Chevalley de Rivaz urged him to leave behind his ambitions and frenetic life in Naples and enter into his care at the spa. Marcello spent three months there and against all expectations recovered sufficiently to resume his career. After his recovery, he wrote a poetic paean to Ischia entitled Ischia. Canti tre. Twenty years later he revised and published the poem with a lengthy dedication letter to Chevalley de Rivaz whom he credited with saving his life and being his "second father". The letter was dated 5 July 1863. Chevalley de Rivaz died in Ischia later that year.

Marcello died in Milan in 1865 at the age of 47 after what his obituary described as a brief illness.
