= Jacques Etienne Chevalley de Rivaz =

Swiss-born physician (1801–1863)

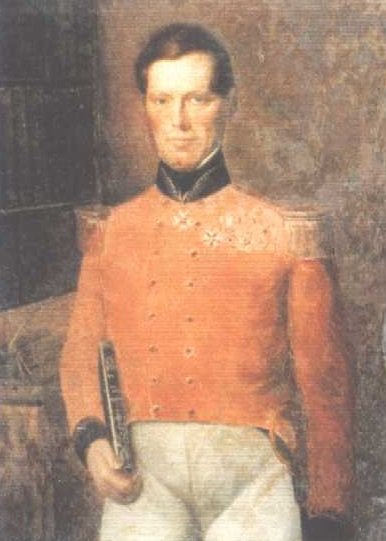
- Born: Jacques Etienne Chevalley; 16 August 1801; Vevey, Switzerland
- Died: 8 December 1863 (aged 62); Casamicciola, Italy
- Other name: Giacomo Stefano Chevalley de Rivaz
- Occupations: physician; writer

Jacques Etienne Chevalley de Rivaz (16 August 1801 – 8 December 1863) was a Swiss-born medical doctor who spent his career in Naples and the Island of Ischia. He was the founder of a famous sanatorium on Ischia and also wrote several works on the geography, archeology, flora and fauna of the island. For his services to Naples during the cholera epidemic of 1836–37, he was awarded a gold medal by King Ferdinand II and citizenship of the Kingdom of the Two Sicilies. Chevalley de Rivaz was born in Vevey, Switzerland and died in Casamicciola, Italy at the age of 62.

== Life and career ==
Chevalley de Rivaz was born in Vevey, Switzerland to Marguerite née Ruchet and Jean Jacques Chevalley. He completed his secondary education in Lausanne where he studied mathematics under Emmanuel Delevey. (Note: Emmanuel Delevey (1764–1839) was a professor of mathematics and geometry at the Académie de Lausanne and wrote two widely used textbooks on the subject.) He then went to Paris to study medicine. He received his preparatory baccalaureates in literature in 1823 and in science in 1824. (Note: According to a biography published in La Rassegna d'Ischia, Chevalley de Rivaz's studies in Paris were interrupted for a time when his involvement in the political turmoil during the reign of Louis XVIII led him to take refuge in a Trappist monastery.) He went on to train as a physician at Hôtel-Dieu hospital while he worked on his doctoral dissertation under François Magendie. He successfully defended his dissertation on the effects of cold weather on animal husbandry and received his doctorate on 16 August 1827. Later that month he was granted French citizenship. He had planned to join the Faculty of medicine in Paris, but developed a form of tuberculosis in his throat. Two of his professors at the Hôtel-Dieu, Guillaume Dupuytren and Joseph Récamier, suggested that he seek out the warmer climate of Italy to restore his health. He arrived in Naples in February 1829 armed with letters of recommendation and shortly thereafter was appointed physician to the French embassy there.

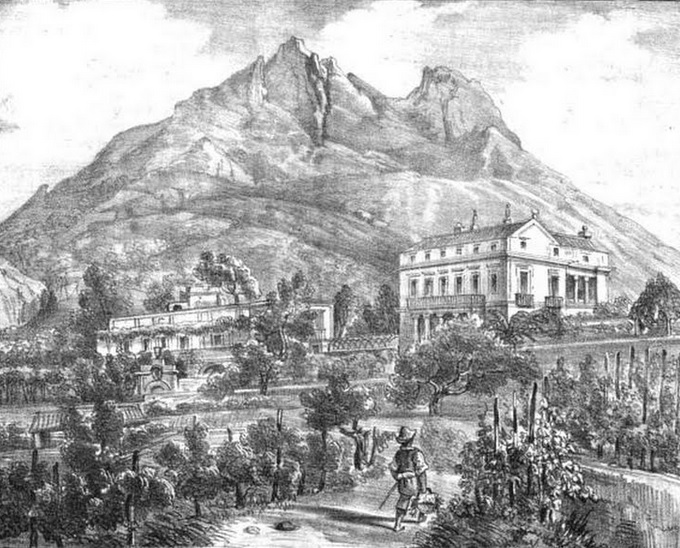
Villa Sauvé, Chevalley de Rivaz's sanatorium in Casamicciola, depicted in 1848

He also set up a private practice in Naples and in 1830 established a sanatorium on the Island of Ischia at Casamicciola, which at the time was noted for its mineral springs. Over the next 33 years Chevalley de Rivaz practiced medicine both in Naples and in Ischia as well as maintaining a free clinic for the poor. In 1837 he was instrumental in halting the cholera epidemic which had broken out at Forio on Ischia. In gratitude for his work, King Ferdinand II conferred on him a gold medal and a knighthood which allowed him to add "de Rivaz" to his name. (Rivaz was his family's ancestral home in Switzerland.) He was also granted citizenship of the Kingdom of the Two Sicilies and made an honorary citizen of both Forio and Casamicciola.

King Ferdinand II and his family regularly spent the summer months on Ischia where Chevalley de Rivaz served as their personal physician. A guest book for his sanatorium at Casamicciola contains the names of all those who stayed there from 1844 until his death in 1863. These included the French novelist Alexandre Dumas, the Russian revolutionary Mikhail Bakunin, and the Italian writer Marco Marcelliano Marcello. In the early 1840s Marcello had become seriously ill and was told that he had a fatal heart disease. A friend introduced him to Chevalley de Rivaz who urged him to leave behind his frenetic life in Naples and enter into his care at the sanatorium. Marcello spent three months there and against all expectations recovered sufficiently to resume his career. After his recovery he wrote a poetic paean to Ischia entitled Ischia. Canti tre. Twenty years later he revised and published the poem with a lengthy dedication letter to Chevalley de Rivaz whom he credited with saving his life and being his "second father".

Chevalley de Rivaz, who considered climatic conditions a major influence on his patients' recovery, set up a meteorological observatory on Ischia where he recorded the daily barometric pressure, temperature, wind direction, and humidity, and compared his data with that of Naples. When an earthquake struck the Island in January 1863, he sent detailed reports to the Academy of Naples and the city's meteorological bulletin. Chevalley de Rivaz died in Casamicciola later that year at the age of 62. At the time of his death he was writing a treatise on Ischia's climate. During his lifetime he had also served as the Consul for France and for the Papal States in Ischia. He was a recipient of the Legion of Honor, the Order of Isabella the Catholic, and the Order of St. Gregory the Great.

== Writings ==
Chevalley de Rivaz published articles in medical journals on an influenza epidemic in Naples, the value of vaccination against smallpox, and the treatment of cholera and syphilis. In them he advocated for public health care and hygiene and on occasion railed against the charlatanism and unscrupulousness of some Neapolitan physicians. However, he was most widely known for his book on the mineral water springs and fumaroles of Ischia, Description des eaux minéro-thermales et des étuves de l'ile d'Ischia. First published in 1835 in both French and Italian, it went through 13 editions over the next 30 years. Although the book concentrated on the analysis of the mineral waters and their use in the treatment of various diseases, it also contained detailed descriptions of the topography, customs, history, and archeology of the island, and for many years was the primary source of information about Ischia.

In 1845 Chevalley de Rivaz attended the VII Riunione degli scienziati italiani, the seventh annual conference of Italian scientists, held that year in Naples. The conference included an excursion by boat to Capri and Paestum. The following year he published an account of the trip entitled Voyage de Naples à Capri et à Paestum exécuté le 4 octobre 1845. In it he combined a lively description of his fellow travellers and the sea voyage itself with descriptions of the places they visited and some of the history surrounding them. In 1834 he had also made a detailed catalogue of the vascular plants of Ischia, entitled Flora pithecusana, ossia Catalogo alfabetico delle piante vascolari dell'isola d'Ischia. The manuscript is held in the library of the Botanical Institute of Rome and in 1914 was reproduced in Annali di botanica published by the Sapienza University of Rome.

== Descendants ==
Chevalley de Rivaz's eldest son, Victor Chevalley de Rivaz (1833–1895), emigrated to England in 1852 and became a British citizen in 1857. He worked as a stockbroker but also had a keen interest in cooking. He wrote cookery columns for The Queen under the pseudonym "The G. C." (Grand Cordon), and published two books on the subject: Round the Table: Notes on cookery, and plain recipes, with a selection of bills of fare for every month (1872) and Practical dinners (1887).
