= Eliza Mazzucato Young =

Italian-American composer and musician (1846–1937)

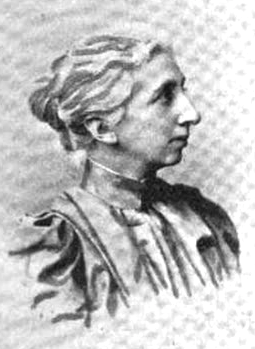
- Eliza Mazzucato Young, from an 1894 publication.
- Born: Elisa Mazzucato; July 7, 1846; Milan
- Died: March 27, 1937 (aged 90); Beverly Hills, California
- Other name: Elisa M. Young
- Occupation: composer

Eliza Mazzucato Young (July 7, 1846 – March 27, 1937) was an Italian-born American composer, musician, and educator. She wrote Mr. Sampson of Omaha (1888), one of the first operas by a woman to be produced in the United States.

== Early life ==
Elisa Mazzucato was born in Milan, the daughter of opera composer Alberto Mazzucato and Teresa Bolza, a daughter of Count Luigi Bolza, Austrian police commissioner in Milan.

Her father was the director of the conservatory at the Teatro alla Scala in Milan. She studied music with her father, and in London.

== Career ==
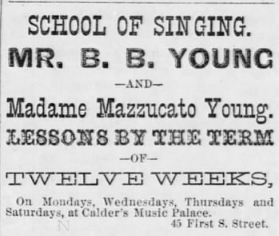
Advertisement for the Youngs' Singing School in Utah, 1885.

Eliza Mazzucato taught at the National Training School of Music in London, before it closed in 1882, and then at the Royal College of Music. She resigned in 1883 when she married one of the students, an American baritone named Bicknell Young. The couple moved to Salt Lake City in 1885, to open a music school, and they performed together in New York City in 1886. By 1895, they were living in Chicago, performing, touring, and teaching at the Chicago Conservatory.

Young composed the music for the comic opera Mr. Sampson of Omaha (1888), one of the first operas by a woman to be produced in the United States; the libretto was by Fred Nye. Sheet music for songs from the opera continued to be published for years after its debut. Other compositions by Young included a one-act opera, The Maiden and the Reaper, and short works for voice, including a song in French, "Le Roi Don Juan", and a setting of Psalm 130. She also wrote pedagogical pieces, such as "Staccato Étude in B".

== Personal life ==
Eliza Mazzucato married fellow musician Brigham Bicknell Young (1856-1938), a son of Joseph Young and a nephew of Brigham Young, in London in 1883. They had three sons, Arrigo Mazzucato Young (1884-1954, born in England), Hilgard Bicknell Young (1885-1979, born in Utah), and Umberto Young (1887-1965, born in Utah). Despite her husband's family connections in the Mormon community, the couple were adherents to Christian Science from the 1890s. Eliza Mazzucato Young died in Beverly Hills, California in 1937, aged 90 years.
