= San Francesco, Bologna =

Coordinates: 44°29′42″N 11°20′07″E

Basilica of Saint Francis
- Basilica di San Francesco
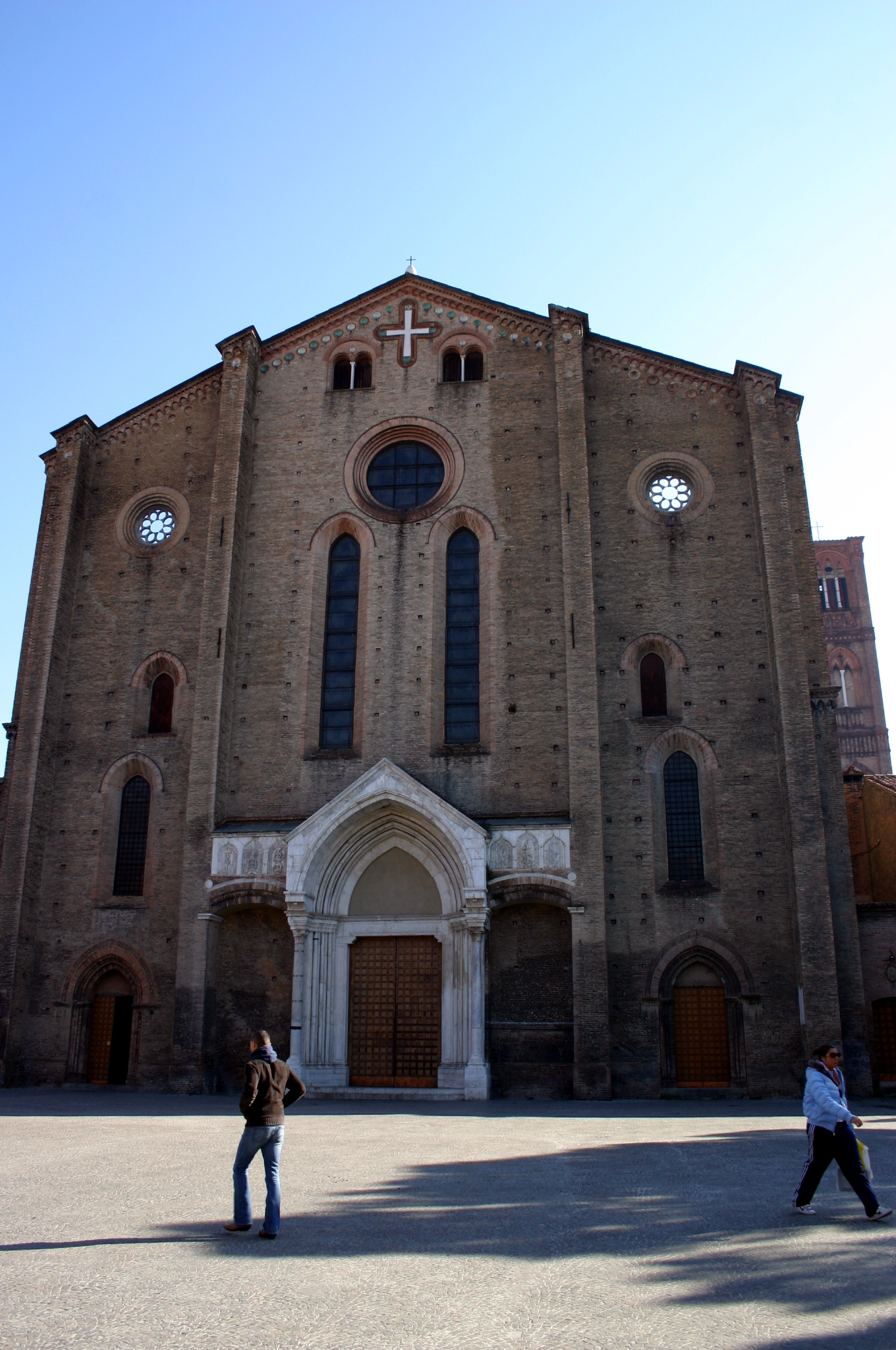
- Basilica of Saint Francis
- Location: Piazza Malpighi, 9; 40123 Bologna
- Country: Italy
- Denomination: Roman Catholic

History
- Consecrated: 1251

Architecture
- Architectural type: Romanesque (facade); French Gothic architecture (interior)
- Groundbreaking: 1236
- Completed: 1263

Administration
- Archdiocese: Bologna

The Basilica of Saint Francis (Italian: Basilica di San Francesco) is a historic church in the city of Bologna in northern Italy. Founded in the 13th century, it has been the property of the Conventual Franciscan friars since then. The church has been raised to the rank of a minor basilica by the Holy See.

== History ==
The Franciscans had occupied a modest house in the city called Santa Maria delle Pugliole, founded in 1211 by Bernard of Quintavalle, one of the first members of the Order. Their noted founder, St. Francis of Assisi, visited the city in 1222 to preach to the people of the city, which sparked a great interest in the Order he had founded. At the urging of Pope Gregory IX, the authorities of the medieval commune gave the property on which the basilica is now built to the friars in 1236 for a church of their own. It was located in the area of the city known as civitas antiqua rupta (the old city ruins), where the remains of the Roman city of Bononia were located.

Construction was begun and sufficiently complete by 1251 that it was consecrated by Pope Innocent IV. The main structure was finally completed in 1263.

During the 18th century, the friary was a center of musical performance and study. A renowned girls choir sang at the services of the church, which was directed by Friar Giambattista Martini, O.F.M. Conv., a noted composer. Among his many students was another friar of the community, Stanislao Mattei, O.F.M. Conv.

During the occupation of Italy by the French Revolutionary Army, in 1796 the church was desecrated and the friary was seized and used as a barracks by the occupying forces. The artworks of the church were seized and scattered. The church was restored to religious use in 1842, but was later seized again in the course of the Second Italian War of Independence and used as a military storehouse. It was finally returned to the Franciscans in 1886. The restoration of the church to its original aspect was carried out under the supervision of Alfonso Rubbiani, an expert in restoration, and were completed in 1919.

== Architecture ==
The architect is not known. Early sources gave Friar Mateo of Brescia as having designed the church. This seems to have been a confusion with Giovanni of Brescia, a leading architect of the period. The 14th-century chronicler of the friary, Bartolomeo of Pugliole, recorded that, when the vault of the apse collapsed in 1254, the restoration work was supervised by one Friar Andrea Maestro della Ghiexia, who is described as "of the twisted legs".

Despite its Romanesque facade, it is one of the best examples of French Gothic architecture in Italy. This is manifest in the interior, which has a nave and two aisles, in the apse with corridor, in the high vaults divided into six sections (like in Notre-Dame de Paris) with ogival arches, and in the use of buttresses.

The church is home to the church monuments of the jurist Accursius and his son Francesco, Odofredus and Rolandino dei Romanzi.

== See also ==
- Italian Gothic architecture
- Medieval French architecture
