= Alessandro Nini =

Italian composer

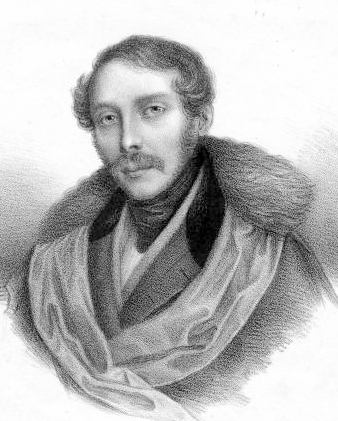
Alessandro Nini

Alessandro Nini (born in Fano near Pesaro, 1 November 1808 – died in Bergamo, 27 December 1880) was an Italian composer of operas and church music, also chamber music and symphonies. Of the eight operas he composed, La marescialla d'Ancre is considered his best work. He also contributed to a portion of Messa per Rossini. Specifically the fifth section of II. Sequentia, Ingemisco for solo tenor and chorus.

He was better known as the husband of soprano Marianna Barbieri-Nini.

== Operas ==
- Ida della torre (11 November 1837, Venice)
- La marescialla d'Ancre (23 July 1839, Padua)
- Cristina di Svezia (6 June 1840, Genoa)
- Margherita d'Yorck (21 March 1841, Venice)
- Odalisa (19 February 1842, Milan)
- Virginia (21 February 1842, Genoa)
- La marescialla d'Ancre [rev] (1 May 1847, Milan)
- Il corsaro (25 September 1847 Turin)
