= Carlo Pedrotti =

Italian conductor, administrator and composer (1817–1893)

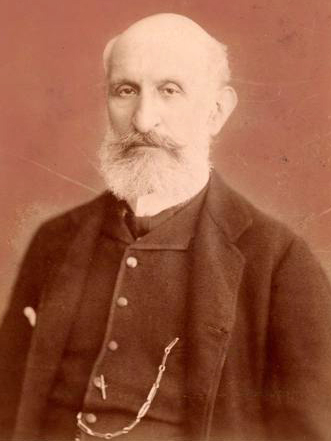
Carlo Pedrotti circa 1882: photograph by Antonio Bertulli

Carlo Pedrotti (12 November 1817 – 16 October 1893) was an Italian conductor, administrator and composer, principally of opera. An associate of Giuseppe Verdi, he also taught two internationally renowned Italian operatic tenors, Francesco Tamagno and Alessandro Bonci.

Pedrotti served as the first director of the Liceo Musicale in Pesaro from 1882 until 1893. He retired in 1893 due to poor health, and committed suicide by drowning in the Adige shortly after his retirement. .

== Early life ==
Pedrotti was born in Verona, where he studied music with the composer Domenico Foroni. He composed two operas which were never performed, but his opera semiseria Lina was successfully given at Foroni's Teatro Filarmonico in 1840, and his next opera, Clara di Mailand, was performed there later that year. This was followed by four seasons as conductor of the Italian Opera in Amsterdam, where a further two operas were composed and premiered.

== Operatic success ==
He returned to Verona in 1845. During the next 23 years, he taught, conducted at the Teatro Nuovo as well as the Teatro Filarmonico and composed a further 10 operas. Fiorina (1851), another opera semiseria, was a success in Italy and beyond, and the commedia lirica Tutti in maschera (1856), his best-known work, was later taken up in Vienna and Paris. It has been successfully revived in recent years in Savona, Piacenza and Rovigo and at the Wexford Festival.

== Turin and Pesaro ==
In 1868, Pedrotti moved to Turin, where he had been appointed director of the Liceo Musicale and conductor and director of the Teatro Regio. At the Liceo, his pupils included the composer and orchestral musician Raffaello Squarise and the heroic tenor Francesco Tamagno, who later created the title role in Verdi's penultimate masterpiece, Otello. At the Regio, as well as improving the quality of opera performances, he inaugurated a series of popular concerts.

Following the death of Gioachino Rossini in November 1868, Pedrotti was one of the composers invited by Verdi to contribute to the Messa per Rossini that was to be performed on the anniversary of Rossini's death. He composed the Tuba mirum section of the Dies Irae, for solo baritone and chorus, but for various reasons the work was never performed in public during his lifetime.

Pedrotti composed only two operas while in Turin, both near the beginning of his tenure. They were Il favorito (1870) and Olema la schiava (1872). They turned out to be his last operas.

During his 14 years in Turin, the Teatro Regio became one of the most important opera houses in Italy. Pedrotti introduced Turin audiences to a number of new French and German operas. These included Meyerbeer's L'Africaine in 1868, Flotow's Martha in 1869, Ambroise Thomas's Mignon in 1876 and his Hamlet in 1881, Massenet's Le roi de Lahore in 1878, Karl Goldmark's Die Königin von Saba in 1879, Bizet's Carmen in 1881 and Gounod's Le tribut de Zamora in 1882. In preparation for the first Turin performances of Lohengrin in 1876, Pedrotti visited Richard Wagner in Munich; the production proved to be a success.

In 1882, Pedrotti moved to Pesaro as the first director of the Liceo Musicale, for the foundation of which Rossini had left money in his will. Among his students was the young Alessandro Bonci, who went on to achieve a career as a prominent lyric tenor in Europe and America. He organised the Rossini Centenary celebrations in 1892, but he retired to Verona, citing ill-health, in 1893. In October of that year, he committed suicide by drowning in the Adige.

== List of operas by Pedrotti ==
Year staged	Name of work	Type of work	Librettist
unstaged	Antigone	opera seria	Marco Marcelliano Marcello
unstaged	La sposa del villagio	opera semiseria	Marco Marcelliano Marcello
1840	Lina	opera semiseria	Marco Marcelliano Marcello
1840	Clara di Mailand	opera seria	
1841	Matilde	opera seria	
1844	La figlia dell'arciere	opera semiseria	Felice Romani
1846	Romea di Montfort	opera seria	Gaetano Rossi
1851	Fiorina, o La fanciulla di Glaris	opera semiseria	L Serenelli Honorati
1852	Il parrucchiere della reggenza	opera comica	Gaetano Rossi
1853	Gelmina, o Col fuoco non si scherza	opera semiseria	Giovanni Peruzzini
1854	Genoveffa di Brabante	opera seria	Gaetano Rossi
1856	Tutti in maschera	commedia lirica	Marco Marcelliano Marcello
1859	Isabella d'Aragona	opera seria	Marco Marcelliano Marcello
1861	Guerra in quattro	opera buffa	Marco Marcelliano Marcello
1861	Mazeppa	tragica	Achille de Lauzières
1865	Marion Delorme	opera seria	Marco Marcelliano Marcello
1870	La vergine di Kermo	melodramma romantica	Francesco Guidi
1870	Il favorito	tragedia lirica	G Bercanovich
1872	Olema la schiava	opera seria	Francesco Maria Piave
