= Antonio Bazzini =

Italian composer (1818–1897)

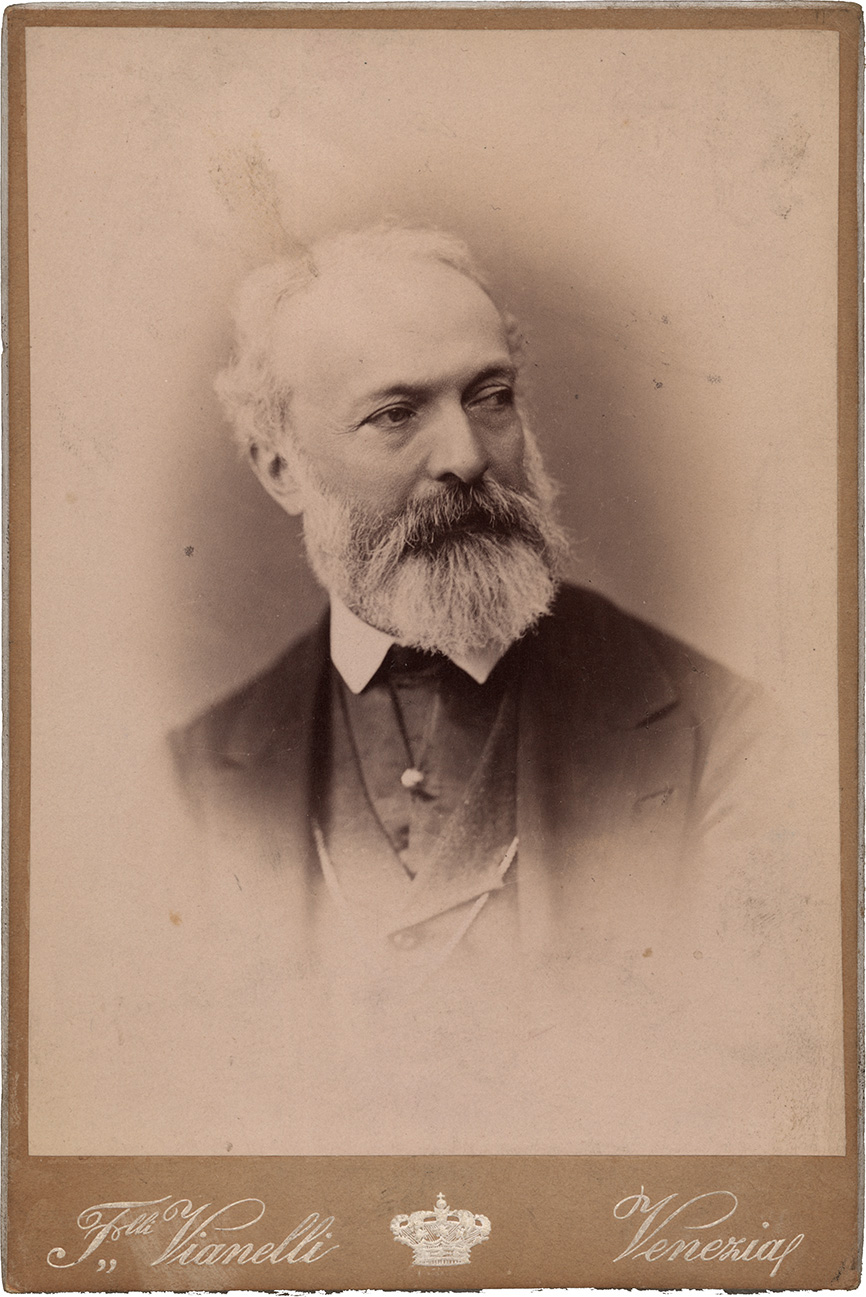
Antonio Bazzini

Antonio Bazzini (11 March 1818 – 10 February 1897) was an Italian violinist, composer and teacher. As a composer, his most enduring work is his chamber music, which earned him a central place in the Italian instrumental renaissance of the 19th century. However, his success as a composer was overshadowed by his reputation as one of the finest concert violinists of the nineteenth century. He also contributed to a portion of Messa per Rossini, specifically the first section of II. Sequentia, Dies Irae.

== Biography ==
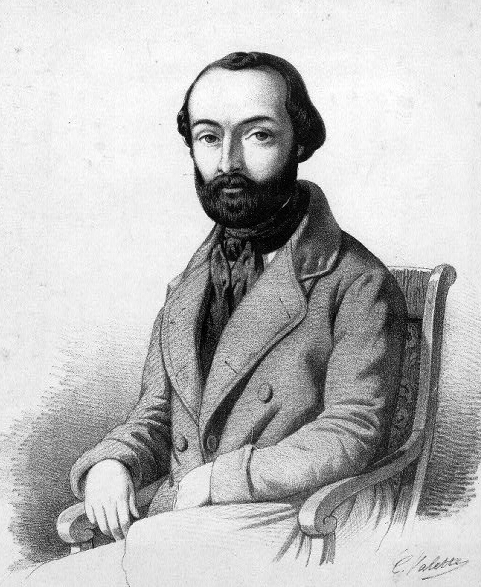
Portrait of Antonio Bazzini

Bazzini was born at Brescia. As a young boy, he was a pupil of a local violinist Faustino Camisani. At 17, he was appointed organist of a church in his native town. The following year, he met Paganini and became completely influenced by that master's art and style. Paganini encouraged Bazzini to begin his concert career that year, and he quickly became one of the most highly regarded artists of his time. From 1841 to 1845, he lived in Germany, where he was much admired by Schumann both as a violinist and a composer, as well as by Mendelssohn (Bazzini gave the first private performance of his Violin Concerto). After a short stay in Denmark in 1845, Bazzini returned to Brescia to teach and compose. In 1846, he played in Naples and Palermo. In 1849–1850 he toured Spain and from 1852 to 1863 lived in Paris. He ended his concert career with a tour of the Netherlands in 1864.

Returning once more to Brescia, Bazzini devoted himself to composition, gradually abandoning the virtuoso opera fantasias and character-pieces, which had formed a large part of his earlier work. He composed an opera Turanda in 1867 (Libretto by Antonio Gazzoletti in 1866) which was only performed 12 times, with mixed reviews, mostly negative, particularly to the libretto. Bazzini also produced a number of dramatic cantatas, sacred works, concert overtures, and symphonic poems over the next two decades. However, his greatest success as a composer was with his chamber music compositions. In 1868, he became president of the Società dei Concerti in Brescia, and was active in promoting and composing for quartet societies in Italy. In 1873, he became composition professor at the Milan Conservatory, where he taught Catalani, Mascagni, and Puccini, and later became the director in 1882. Bazzini died in Milan on 10 February 1897.

=== Music ===
Bazzini was highly regarded in his time and influenced the great opera composer Giacomo Puccini. His most enduring work is his chamber music, which is written in the classic forms of the German school and has earned him a place in the Italian instrumental renaissance of the 19th century. Of particular note is his String Quartet No. 1, which won the Milan Quartet Society's first prize in 1864. Bazzini played a violin by Giuseppe Guarneri, which after his death passed to Marie Soldat-Roeger.

Artists who have recorded his music include Chloë Hanslip, Bronislaw Huberman, Jascha Heifetz, Yehudi Menuhin, David Garrett, James Ehnes, and Itzhak Perlman.

=== Selected works ===
The Dance of the Goblins (La Ronde des Lutins), Scherzo fantastique, Op. 25
Recorded before 1917. Run time is 1:53

==== Chamber music ====
- The Dance of the Goblins (La Ronde des Lutins), Scherzo fantastique, Op. 25 (1852)
- String Quartet No. 1 in C major, WoO, (1864)
- String Quartet No. 2 in D minor, Op. 75 (1877)
- String Quartet No. 3 in E flat major, Op. 76 (1878)
- String Quartet No. 4 in G major, Op. 79 (1888)
- String Quartet No. 5 in C minor, Op. 80 (1891)
- String Quartet No. 6 in F major, Op. 82 (1892)
- String Quintet in A major for 2 violins, viola and 2 cellos, WoO. (1866)

==== Orchestral works ====
- Violin Concerto No.3 in B major, Op.29
- Violin Concerto No.4 in A minor, Op.38
- Violin Concerto No.5 in D major Militaire, Op.42
- Re Lear, Overture, Op.68
- Francesca da Rimini, Symphonic Poem, Op.77 (Berlin, 1889/90)

==== Operas ====
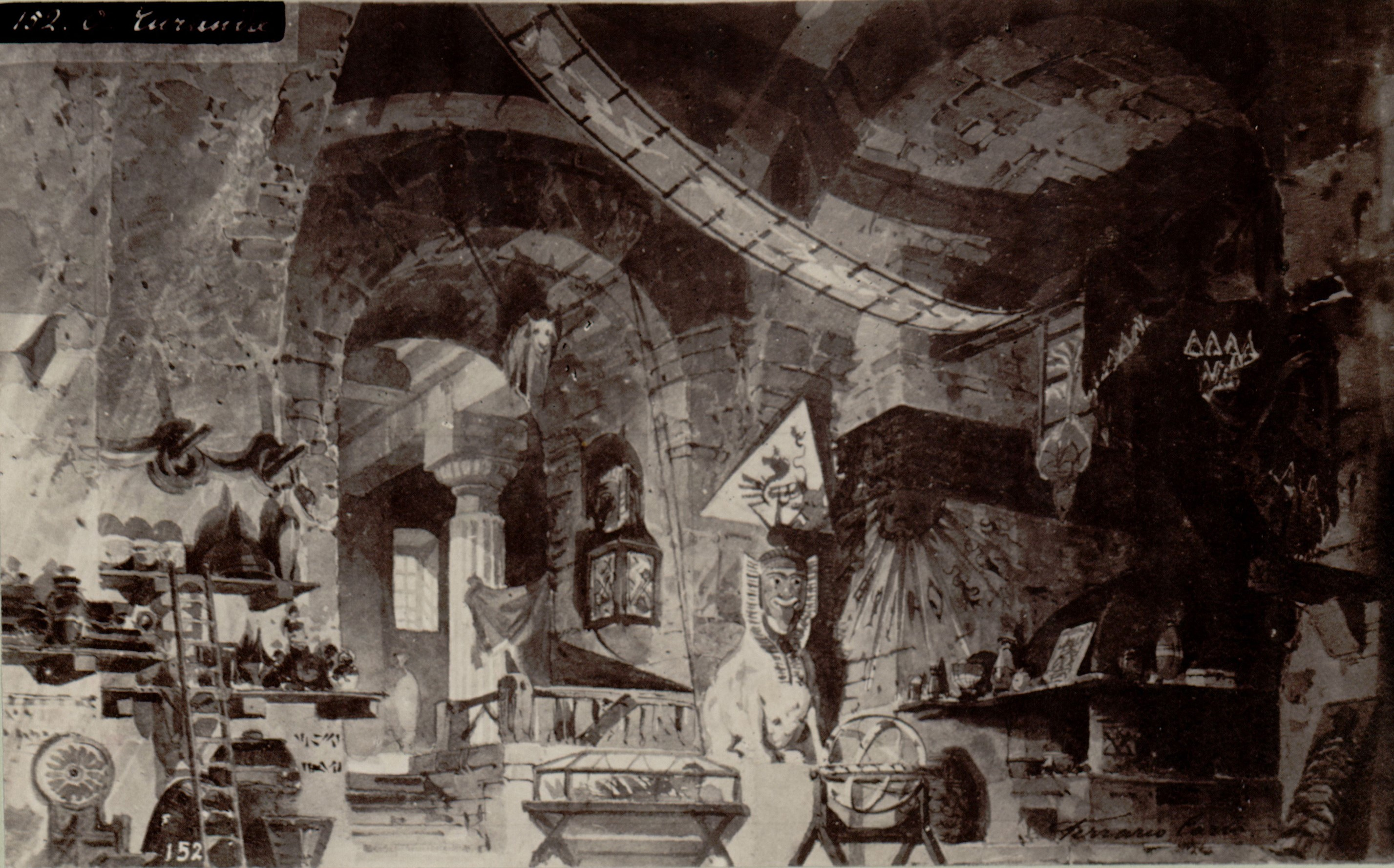
Laboratorio di Ormut destinato agli studii e alle evocazioni magiche, set design for Turanda act 3, scene 3 (1867).

- Il silfo e l'innamorato, (Milan, 1865)
- Turanda (Milan, La Scala, 13 January 1867)

== Sources ==
- Ballola, Giovanni Carli & Marvin, Roberta Montemorra: "Antonio Bazzini." Grove Music Online, ed. L. Macy. (Accessed 12 March 2018. Subscription access.)
