= Kapellmeister =

Person in charge of music-making

Kapellmeister (/kəˈpɛlmaɪstər/ kə-PEL-my-stər, US also /kɑːˈ-/ kah-, German: [kaˈpɛlˌmaɪstɐ]), from Kapelle ('chapel') and Meister ('master'), literally 'master of the chapel choir', is a word of German origin that designates the leader of an ensemble of musicians. Originally used to refer to somebody in charge of music in a chapel, the term has evolved considerably in its meaning and is today used for denoting the leader of a musical ensemble, often smaller ones used for TV, radio, and theatre.

== Terminology ==
Variant spellings capellmeister and capelle, to refer to the orchestra or choir, are sometimes encountered in English language works about composers who held the title.

The word Hofkapellmeister specified that the Kapellmeister worked at a nobleman's court (Hof); a Konzertmeister held a somewhat less senior position.

Positions equivalent to Kapellmeister existed in other European countries and were referred to with equivalent names, as follows:

- Catalan: mestre de capella
- Dutch: kapelmeester
- English: chapel-master
- Finnish: kapellimestari, still the primary word used of conductors
- French: maître de chapelle
- Italian: maestro di cappella
- Polish: kapelmistrz
- Portuguese: mestre de capela
- Russian: капельме́йстер, romanized: kapel'méyster
- Spanish: maestro de capilla
- Swedish: kapellmästare.

== Usage ==
=== Historical usage ===
In German-speaking countries during the approximate period 1500–1800, the word Kapellmeister often designated the director of music for a monarch or nobleman. For English speakers, it is this sense of the term that is most often encountered, since it appears frequently in biographical writing about composers who worked in German-speaking countries. During that period, in Italy, the position (Italian: maestro di cappella) largely referred to directors of music assigned to cathedrals and sacred institutions rather than those under royal or aristocratic patronage.

A Kapellmeister position was a senior one and involved supervision of other musicians. Johann Sebastian Bach worked from 1717 to 1723 as Kapellmeister for Prince Leopold of Anhalt-Cöthen. Joseph Haydn worked for many years as Kapellmeister for the Esterházy family, a high-ranking noble family of the Habsburg monarchy. George Frideric Handel served as Kapellmeister for George, Elector of Hanover (who eventually became King George I of Great Britain).

A Kapellmeister might also be the director of music for a church. Thus, Georg Reutter was the Kapellmeister at St. Stephen's Cathedral, Vienna, where his young choristers included both Joseph and Michael Haydn.

Becoming a Kapellmeister was a mark of success for professional musicians. For instance, Joseph Haydn once remarked that he was glad his father (a wheelwright) had lived long enough to see his son become a Kapellmeister. The term also implied the possession of considerable musical skill. When the 18th-century actor and musician Joachim Daniel Preisler heard the famous soprano Aloysia Weber (Mozart's sister-in-law) perform in her home, he paid her the following compliment in his diary:

The well-known Mozardt is her brother-in-law and has taught her so well that she accompanies from a score and plays interludes like a Kapellmeister.

By the end of the 18th century, many of the nobility had declined in their economic power relative to the newly prosperous middle class. Eventually, the maintenance of a Kapelle became too expensive for most nobles, which led to a decline in the number of Kapellmeister positions. A well-known instance occurred in 1790, when Prince Anton Esterházy succeeded his father Nikolaus and dismissed almost all of the latter's extensive musical establishment. But Prince Anton was hardly alone in doing this; during this same period, "the steady decline in the number of orchestras supported by aristocratic families represented a ... change that affected all composers and their works." This was a difficult time for musicians, who needed to find new ways to support themselves. For instance, Ludwig van Beethoven (1770–1827) never worked as a Kapellmeister but was supported by a somewhat unreliable combination of noble patronage, publication, and concert income.

==== The case of Mozart ====
Mozart never was a Kapellmeister in the sense given above. In 1787, he was given a paid position in the court of the Austrian Emperor Joseph II as Kammercompositeur (chamber composer), but authority in matters musical at the court was exercised primarily by Antonio Salieri. In reviews, diaries, and advertising, Mozart was commonly referred to as (Herr) Kapellmeister Mozart. It seems that Mozart's prestige, along with the fact that he frequently appeared in public directing other musicians, led to the use of "Kapellmeister" as a term of respect.

In April 1791, Mozart applied to become the Kapellmeister at St. Stephen's Cathedral and was designated by the City Council to take over this job following the death of the then-ailing incumbent, Leopold Hofmann. This never took place, since Mozart died (December 1791) before Hofmann did (1793).

=== Contemporary usage ===
In contemporary German, the term Kapellmeister has become less common than Dirigent (conductor). When used today it designates the director or chief conductor of an orchestra or choir. It suggests involvement in orchestra or choir policy (for example, selecting repertoire, concert schedules, and guest conductors) as well as conducting. In military settings it refers to a bandmaster. The music director of the Leipzig Gewandhaus Orchestra traditionally holds the old-fashioned title Gewandhauskapellmeister. In other German opera houses, the term generally refers to a deputy conductor reporting to the Generalmusikdirektor (general music director, usually also the chief conductor). An opera company may have several Kapellmeister, ranked as Erste Kapellmeister (First...), Zweiter Kapellmeister (Second...), etc.

The conductor Christian Thielemann has offered a nuanced account of the Dirigent/Kapellmeister distinction in contemporary usage. He suggests that "Kapellmeister" has unfairly acquired a sense of routine or failure to project glamour: "a Kapellmeister now describes a pale, meek figure beating time. A policeman on duty at the podium directing the musical traffic, no more." In fact, Thielemann, who is fully aware of the historical usage of the term, would himself prefer to be called a "Kapellmeister": "it implies such virtues as knowledge of a work, great ability, and dedication to the cause of music".

The term "Kapellmeister Tradition" is commonly used to describe these qualities, as exemplified by such historically important conductors as Otto Klemperer, Clemens Krauss, and Erich Kleiber, in the sense that they have "paid their dues" on their way to international fame.

== Composers who held the post of Kapellmeister ==
(listed chronologically by date of birth)

- Arnold von Bruck (c. 1500–1554) was Kapellmeister in Vienna for Ferdinand I, King of Bohemia, Hungary and Croatia from 1527 to 1545.
- Mattheus Le Maistre (c. 1505–1577) was Kapellmeister at the court of the Electors of Saxony in Dresden from 1554 to 1568.
- Antonio Scandello (1517–1580) was Kapellmeister at the court of the Electors of Saxony in Dresden from 1568.
- Jacob Regnart (1540s–1599) was Kapellmeister at Innsbruck from 1585 to about 1596.
- Michael Praetorius (1571–1621) was Kapellmeister at Wolfenbüttel from 1604.
- Heinrich Schütz (1585–1673) was Kapellmeister to John George I, Elector of Saxony from 1619.
- Samuel Scheidt (1587–1653) was Kapellmeister to the Margrave of Brandenburg.
- Michelangelo Falvetti (1642–1697) was Kapellmeister in Palermo from 1670, then in Messina from 1682.
- Heinrich Ignaz Franz Biber (1644–1704) was Kapellmeister in Salzburg from 1684.
- Georg Muffat (1653–1704) was Kapellmeister to the bishop of Passau from 1690 to his death.
- Agostino Steffani (1653–1728) was Kapellmeister from 1688 to 1698 at the court of Hanover.
- Johann Caspar Ferdinand Fischer (died 1746) was Kapellmeister to Louis William, Margrave of Baden-Baden, from at least 1695.
- Johann Ludwig Bach (1677–1731), a second cousin of J. S. Bach, was Kapellmeister at Meiningen.
- Georg Philipp Telemann (1681–1767) served as Kapellmeister for 16 years, starting in 1705, for the court of Erdmann II, Count of Promnitz, in Hamburg.
- Johann David Heinichen (1683–1729) held the position of Kapellmeister at the electoral Saxon court in Dresden from 1717 until his death.
- Johann Sebastian Bach (1685–1750) worked from 1717 to 1723 as Kapellmeister for Leopold, Prince of Anhalt-Köthen.
- George Frideric Handel (1685–1759) served as Kapellmeister from 1710 to 1712 for George, Elector of Hanover.
- Domenico Scarlatti (1685–1757) was maestro di cappella at St. Peter's Cathedral in Rome from 1715 to 1719.
- Johann Friedrich Fasch (1688–1758) was Kapellmeister from 1722 at Zerbst.
- Carlo Grua (c. 1700–1773) was Kapellmeister at the court of Mannheim under the Electorship of Charles III Philip.
- Carl Heinrich Graun (1704–1759) was Kapellmeister starting in 1740 for Frederick the Great (Frederick II of Prussia)
- Giuseppe Bonno (1711–1788) was Kapellmeister to the Prince of Saxe-Hildburghausen in the 1750s and 1760s.
- Giacomo Matteo Ignazio Cirri (1711–1787) was maestro di cappella in the Cathedral of Forlì, in Italy, from 1759.
- Ludwig van Beethoven (Lodewijk) (1712–1773), grandfather of Ludwig van Beethoven, served as Kapellmeister in the Electoral court of Bonn.
- Christoph Willibald Gluck (1714–1787) was Kapellmeister starting 1754 for Maria Theresa, Archduchess of Austria and Holy Roman Empress in Vienna.
- Niccolò Jommelli (1714–1774) served Charles II Eugene, Duke of Württemberg in Stuttgart from 1753 to 1768.
- Giovanni Battista Cirri (1724–1808) was maestro di cappella in the cathedral of Forlì, in Italy: from 1780, with Ignazio Cirri; after his death, alone.
- Christian Cannabich (1731–1798), Kapellmeister of the legendary Mannheim court orchestra from 1774.
- Joseph Haydn (1732–1809) had two Kapellmeister positions: first, from (probably) 1757 to 1761 for Count Morzin, then from 1761 on for the Eszterházy family. (He was Vice-Kapellmeister from 1761 to 1766.)
- Johann Georg Albrechtsberger (1736–1809) was Kapellmeister at St. Stephen's Cathedral, Vienna.
- Michael Haydn (1737–1806) was Kapellmeister at Großwardein from 1760 to 1761.
- Carl Ditters von Dittersdorf (1739–1799) was Kapellmeister to the Prince-Bishop of Breslau from 1770 to 1795.
- Andrea Luchesi (1741–1801) was the last Kapellmeister in the Electoral court of Bonn from 1774 to 1794.
- Antonio Salieri (1750–1825) was Royal and Imperial Kapellmeister to Joseph II, Holy Roman Emperor from 1788 to 1824.
- Johann Friedrich Reichardt (1752–1814) was Kapellmeister to Frederick the Great at the royal Berlin opera.
- Joseph Martin Kraus (1756–1792) was Kapellmeister (Ordinarie Capellmästere) in Stockholm at the court of king Gustav III of Sweden.
- Christian Kalkbrenner (1755–1806) was Kapellmeister of the Prussian Queen (1789) and after 1790 Kapellmeister of Prince Henry of Prussia at Rheinsberg castle.
- Wilhelm Friedrich Ernst Bach (1759–1845), grandson of Johann Sebastian, was also Kapellmeister of the Prussian Queen (1805–1811).
- Carl Maria von Weber (1786–1826) was Kapellmeister at the Bresault theater (1804–1807) and Kapellmeister at Dresden for Count Heinrich Vitzthum (1816–1826).
- Richard Wagner (1813–1883) was Kapellmeister to Frederick Augustus II of Saxony from 1843 to 1849.
- Paul Wachs (1851–1915) was Kapellmeister at the Church of Saint-Merri in Paris, France.

== See also ==
- Cantor (Christianity)
- Collegium Musicum
- Music Bureau
- Master of the King's Music, approximate British equivalent to royal and noble Kapellmeisters of Germany

== Sources ==
- Deutsch, Otto Erich (1965). Mozart: A Documentary Biography. Translated by Eric Blom; Peter Branscombe; Jeremy Noble. Stanford, California: Stanford University Press.
- Griesinger, Georg August (1963) [1810, Leipzig, Breitkopf & Härtel]. "Biographical Notes Concerning Joseph Haydn". Haydn: Two Contemporary Portraits. Translated by Vernon Gotwals. Milwaukee: University of Wisconsin Press. ISBN 978-0-299-02794-0.
- Jones, David Wyn (2009). "Reception". In David Wyn Jones (ed.). Oxford Composer Companions: Haydn. Oxford: Oxford University Press.
- Thielemann, Christian (2015). My Life with Wagner. Translated by Anthea Bell. London: Weidenfeld & Nicolson. ISBN 978-1-780-22837-2.
