= Luigi Petrali =

Italian composer

Luigi Petrali (1815–1855) was an Italian composer. He was a student of Saverio Mercadante. His opera Sofonisba premiered at La Scala on 6 February 1844. On 23 February 1854 his opera Ginevra di Scozia premiered at the Teatro Sociale di Mantova.
