= Giovanni Battista Rossi =

Italian composer

Giovanni Battista Rossi (fl. 1585 – c. 1628) was an Italian composer, music theorist, and member of the Somaschi Fathers.

== Life and career ==
Giovanni Battista Rossi was born in an unknown year in the city of Genoa. He was a member of the Somaschi Fathers. His music treatise Organo de cantori per intendere da se stesso ogni passo difficile che si trova nella musica, et anco per imparare contrapunto was completed in 1585 but not published until 1618 in the city of Venice. The work is an instruction manual on the fundamentals of counterpoint. Example music in the book include works by Josquin and Palestrina, and some original cantilenas written by Rossi that are scored for two to five vocalists depending on the cantilena. Also published in Venice, was Rossi's choral setting of the Magnificat in 1618, and a volume of four-part masses in 1628 entitled Threni Ieremiae Prophetae, super voces Gregorianas, & miserere.

After 1628 the whereabouts and activities of Rossi are not known; including the details of his death. A later volume of solo motets entitled Indice di tutte le opere di musica che si trovano nella Stampa della Pigna di Alessandro Vincenti was published in 1658 with the named author of Giovanni Battista Rossi. It is uncertain whether or not this was music written by the Somaschi Father or by another person of the same name.
