= Giulio Rossi (painter) =

Italian painter and photographer (1824–1884)

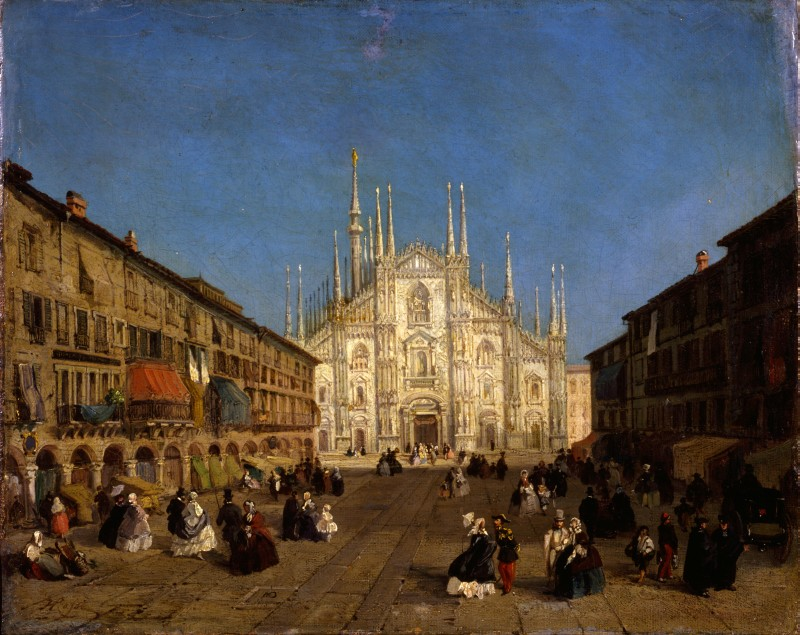
Veduta della piazza del Duomo di Milano, 1845–1850 (Fondazione Cariplo)

Giulio Rossi (Milan, 1824–1884) was an Italian painter and photographer.

== Biography ==
A leading figure in the Cinque Giornate uprising of 1848 in Milan, Giulio Rossi devoted his energies to painting and photography, specialising as a photographic portraitist in the following decade. He is known to have had his first studio in Contrada dei Nobili (later renamed Via dell’Unione) in 1854 and to have moved from there to Via Bigli in 1866. He was awarded a silver medal at the Esposizione Industriale Italiana (Milan, Salone dei Giardini Pubblici, 1871). A talented experimenter with photographic techniques, he achieved success with portraits of the upper middle-class and aristocratic society of the time, expanding his business with two new shops on Corso Vittorio Emanuele and branches in Genoa and Trieste.

== Other projects ==
Media related to Giulio Rossi at Wikimedia Commons
