= Giovanni Battista Cirri =

Italian composer (1724-1808)

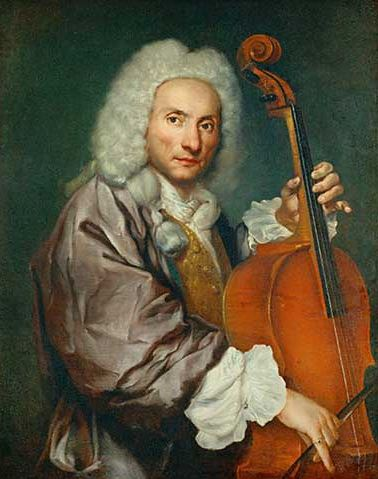
- Born: 1 October 1724; Forlì, Emilia-Romagna Region, Italy
- Died: 11 June 1808 (aged 83); Forlì, Emilia-Romagna Region, Italy
- Occupation: Italian musician

Giovanni Battista Cirri (1 October 1724 – 11 June 1808) was an Italian cellist and composer in the 18th century.

== Biography ==
Cirri was born in Forlì in the Emilia-Romagna Region of Italy. He had his first musical training with his brother Ignazio (1711–1787) and was for a time organist at Forlì Cathedral. He also studied with Giovanni Battista Martini, in Bologna.

In 1739 he was admitted to Holy Orders but decided to pursue a musical career. From 1759 he was a member of the "Accademia Filarmonica". He was in Paris during the first half of the 1760s and his first works were published including a "Symphony" which was performed at the Concert Spirituel on 5 April 1763.

In 1764 he settled in London where he was employed as chamber musician to the Duke of York and Albany and director of music to the Duke of Gloucester and Edinburgh. His first public appearance in London on 16 May 1764 was as an accompanist to violinist Marcella. He played solos at the eight-year-old Mozart's first public concert in London. He also participated in the Bach-Abel Concerts which were very popular at that time. While in London he also composed numerous works for cello including the "Drei Sonaten für Violoncello und Basso continuo" (c. 1765).

In the year 1780 he returned to his native Forlì to help his ailing brother at the Cathedral, though he played away from Forlì and in 1782 was principal cellist at the Teatro dei Fiorentini in Naples. In 1787 he succeeded his brother as "maestro di cappella" at Forlì Cathedral.

He died in Forlì in 1808.

== Selected works ==
- Three duos for violin and cello (Op. 1)
- Six sonatas for cello and basso continuo for His Royal Highness The Duke Of Cumberland (Op. 3)
- Six trio sonatas for two violins and basso continuo (Op. 4)
- Three duos for flute and cello (Op. 7)
- Eight duos for two cellos for His Most Serene Highness the Prince Of Brunswick (Op. 8)
- Six solos for cello and bass (Op. 11)
- Six duos for violin and cello (Op. 12)
- Six cello concertos (Op. 14)
- Six sonatas for cello and double bass for the Honorable William Ward (Op. 15)
- Sonatas for Cello and Keyboard (Op. 16)
