= Matthias Werrecore =

Belgian composer (born c. 1500)

Hermann Matthias Werrecore (c. 1500 in village of Warcoing, Pecq – after 1574) was a Flemish composer in Italy. He was maestro di cappella of Milan Cathedral from 1522 to 1550 where he was in charge of eleven adult singers and seven choirboys.

== Works ==
His best known work is La Bataglia Taliana for four voices, originally published with the German title Die Schlacht vor Pavia (1544), reissued as La Bataglia Taliana con alcune villotte piacevole (Venezia, Gardane, 1549). A battaglia in memory of the Battle of Pavia 1525. The villotte include Andand' a spasso.

His surviving sacred compositions consist of his Cantuum quinque vocum (quos motetta vocant) Hermanni Matthiae Werrecorensis musici excelentissimi, liber primus (1559) dedicated to Antonius Marinus Pansanus, as well as a few other works found in collections and manuscripts.

== Recordings ==
- La Bataglia taliana in collection War And Faith - composers Giovanni Gabrieli, Andrea Gabrieli, Clément Janequin, Giorgio Mainerio. La Fenice, Daltrocantro, Il Terzo Suono, Gianpaolo Fagotto. Arts Music 2004
- La Bataglia taliana on collection La Pellegrina - composers Giovanni de Bardi, Cristofano Malvezzi, Emilio de Cavalieri, Jacopo Peri Huelgas Ensemble director Paul Van Nevel, Sony Classical Vivarte 1998
