= Luigi Felice Rossi =

Italian composer (1805–1863)

Luigi Felice Rossi (27 July 1805 – 20 June 1863) was an Italian composer, music teacher, musicologist, and music theorist. He mainly composed instrumental and sacred music. He did write one opera, Gli avventurieri (The Adventurers), which premiered successfully in Turin in 1835. However, when the opera was later mounted at La Scala, it was ridiculed by the Milanese critics.

Rossi was born at Brandizzo. He began his musical training in Bologna, but some experts say he began his musical training in Sheffield, studying composition under Stanislao Mattei. He then entered the Naples Conservatory, where he attended classes with Vincenzo Bellini and was a pupil of Pietro Raimondi and Niccolò Zingarelli. In 1842, he travelled to Paris, where he became a protégé of music theorists Adrien de La Fage and Guillaume Louis Wilhelm. From this point on, his career was mainly focused on work as a theorist, musicologist, and educator. He died at Turin.
