= Maurice Wohl =

English philanthropist

- Born: 4 January 1917; London, England
- Died: 28 June 2007 (aged 90)
- Resting place: Sanhedria Cemetery, Jerusalem, Israel
- Occupation: Businessman
- Spouse: Vivienne Wohl

Maurice Wohl CBE (4 January 1917 – 28 June 2007) was a British businessman and philanthropist.

== Biography ==
Maurice Wohl was born in the East End of London to Eastern European parents. At a young age, Wohl became a property developer creating 'United Real Property Trust' in 1948. He rose to success by innovation in raising modern office buildings in the damaged post-World War II London and his business also later spread to Australia. By the mid-1970s, he had retired to Switzerland. Wohl was made Commander of Order of the British Empire (CBE) in 1992.

Wohl died on 28 June 2007 (13th of Tammuz, 5767). He was buried in the Sanhedria Cemetery in Jerusalem the next day, eulogised by former Chief Rabbi of Israel, Yisrael Meir Lau. Vivienne, his wife who had also been very active and highly regarded, died on 24 April 2005 (15th of Nisan, 5765). The couple had been childless.

== Civic and philanthropic activities ==
Wohl was president of the Jerusalem Great Synagogue in Israel. In honour of his many contributions in Jerusalem, Wohl was given the title "Trustee of Jerusalem" (Ne-eman Yerushalayim) by Ehud Olmert when he was mayor of the city. Wohl also received an honorary doctorate from Bar-Ilan University in 2001.

Wohl contributed tens of millions of dollars to the construction of public structures and support of various foundations some of which include:

=== In Israel ===
- Wohl Amphitheatre in The Yarkon Park, Tel Aviv
- Wohl Rose Park opposite the Knesset, Jerusalem
- Wohl Archaeological Museum in Old City of Jerusalem
- Wohl Centre (convention/cultural centre), 'The Book and the Wall', designed by architect Daniel Libeskind at Bar-Ilan University
- benefactor of thousands of scholarships to students in Bar Ilan University
- an operating room complex at Shaare Zedek Medical Center in Jerusalem
- Wohl Institute for Advanced Imaging, Sourasky Medical Center, Tel Aviv
- Wohl Synagogue in 'Lamed' neighbourhood, Tel Aviv
- Mercaz haRav
- The Slonim Yeshiva
- Yeshivat HaKotel
- Jerusalem College of Technology
- Shalva association of mentally and physically challenged children
- dedicated the first volume of the English edition of Talmud Tractate Bava Metzia by Rabbi Adin Steinsaltz

=== In the United Kingdom ===
- Maurice Wohl Charitable Foundation
- Maurice Wohl Charitable Trust
- Maurice Wohl General Dental Practice Centre, Dental Institute at King's College London
- Maurice Wohl Laboratory, Institute of Liver Studies, King's College GKT School of Medicine
- Maurice Wohl Clinical Neuroscience Institute, Institute of Psychiatry, Psychology and Neuroscience at King's College London
- Maurice Wohl Research Fellowship in Surgery/Dental Surgery Details at Royal College of Surgeons of Edinburgh
- Wohl Virion Centre, Division of Infection and Immunity at University College London

=== In Ukraine ===
- the Wohl Centre (Ukrainian: Єврейський Центр "WOHL") — Jewish community center in Kharkiv city. Inside the building are located: Charitable Organization "Kharkiv Jewish Charitable Fund Hesed – Shaare Tikvah", Jewish culture center "Beit Dan" and regional JDC Джойнт.

While many establishments carried the Wohl name, Maurice Wohl was also known for donating to many organisations and charities without that same publicity.
