= Wohl Centre =

Coordinates: 32.07148079°N 34.84669176°E

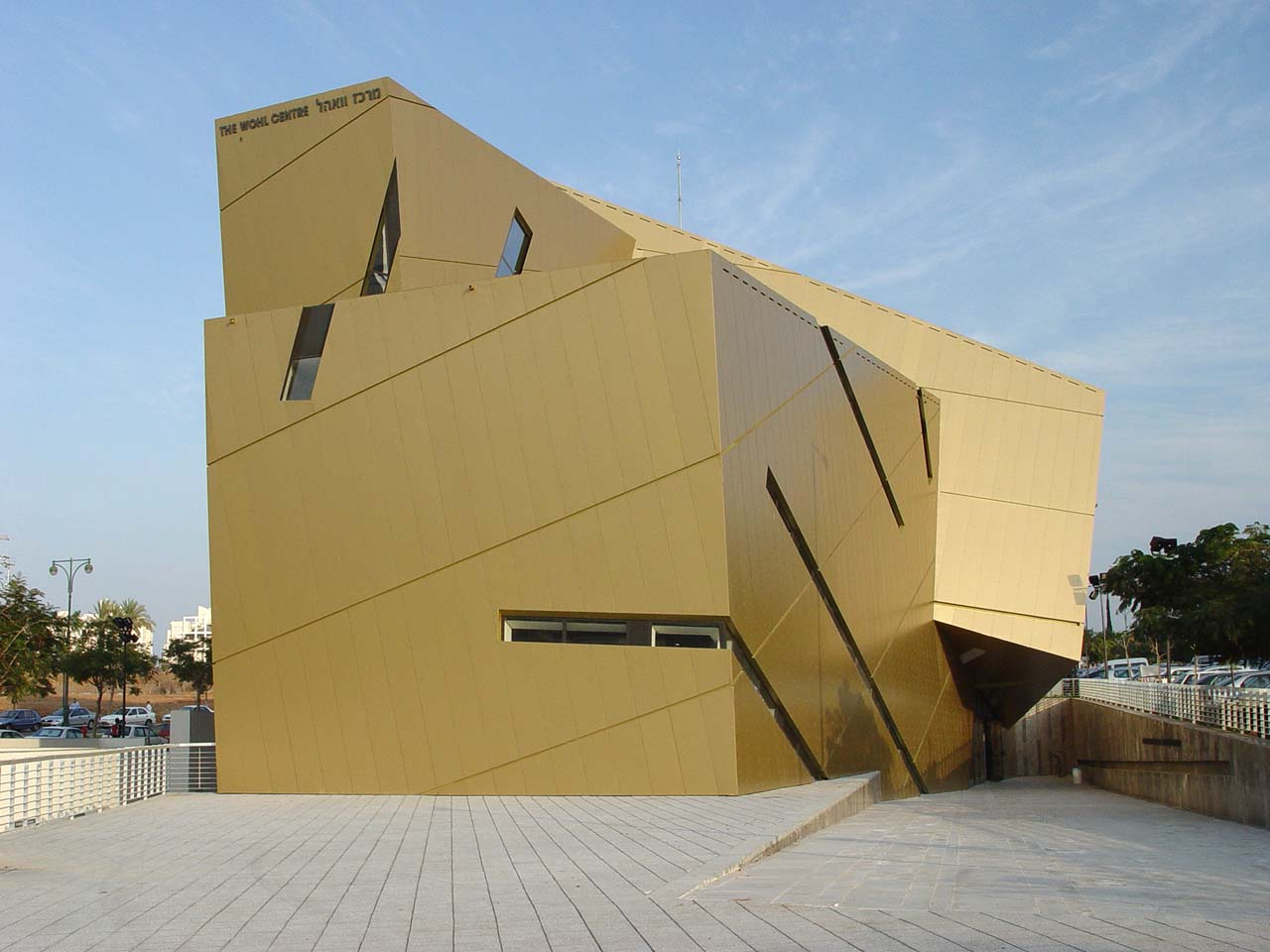
The Wohl Centre from the south

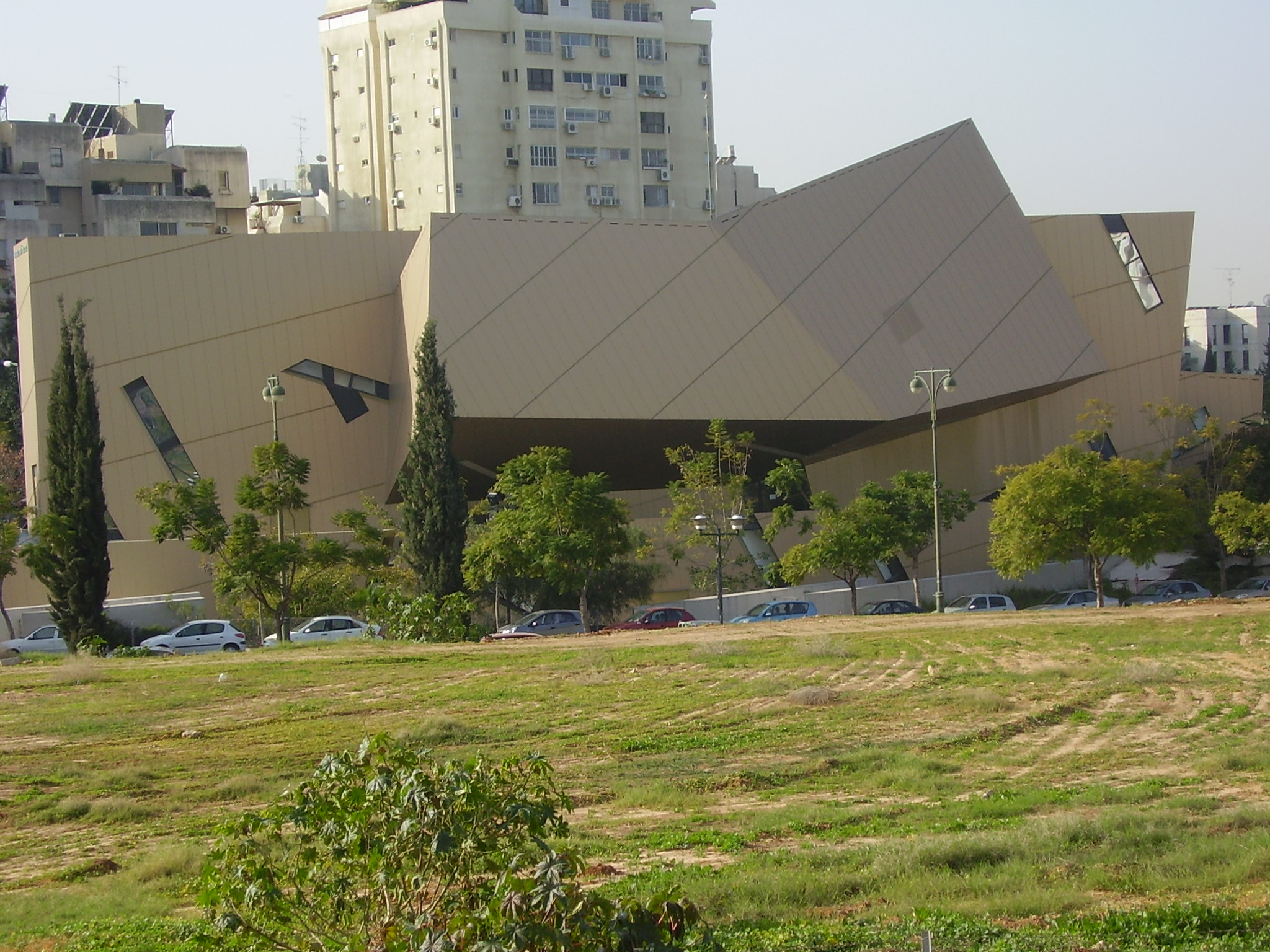
The Wohl Centre from west

The Wohl Centre is a convention center on the main campus of Bar-Ilan University in Ramat-Gan, Israel.

== History ==
Wohl Centre was built between 2001 and 2005 and covers about 42,000 square feet (3,900 square meters). The building, designed by the internationally renowned Daniel Libeskind and a local architecture firm, the Heder Partnership, has been noted for its stark exterior and uncluttered interior. In 2006, the Wohl Centre won a RIBA International Award for its architecture. The building was designated in 2019 a B-class site for conservation.

== Design ==
The building, which was Daniel Libeskind's first in Israel, was built on a relatively small budget. The ILS43 million ($7.2 million) it cost to construct the center came in part from British philanthropist Maurice Wohl.

Three long rectangular "bars" comprise the building's base, above which rests a 1,000-seat auditorium. The center's angular form evokes an open book and, according to Libeskind, embodies "the interrelation between the dynamics of knowledge and the unifying role of faith." Hebrew letters inspired the shapes of the windows, which cut across a gold-colored aluminum exterior.

== See also ==
- Architecture of Israel
