= Reflections at Keppel Bay =

Residential skyscraper in Singapore

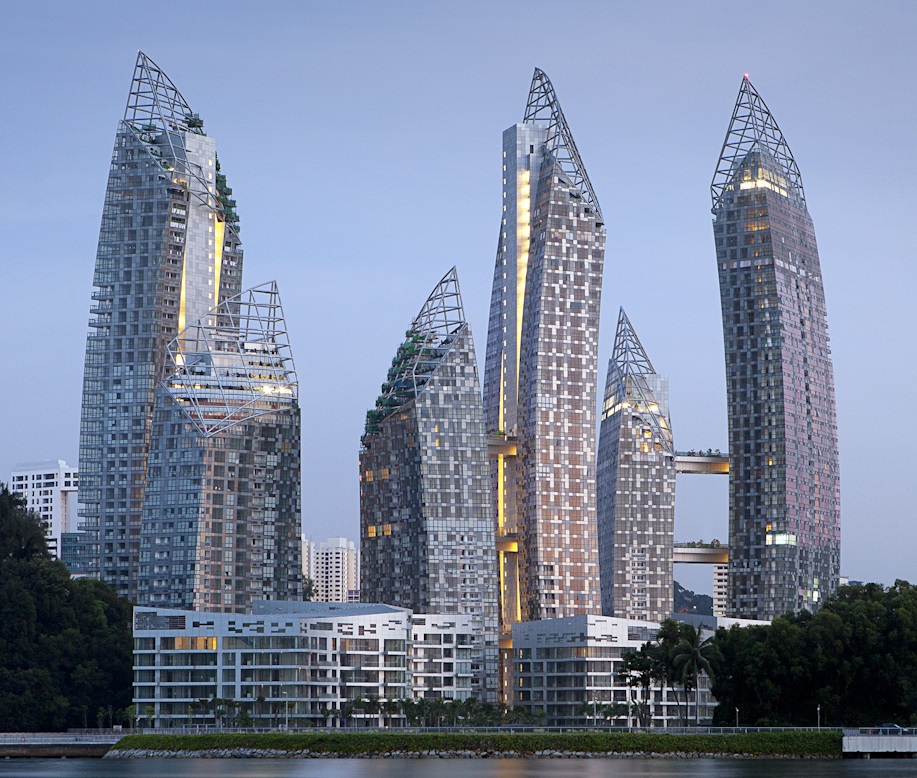
- Interactive map of the Reflections at Keppel Bay area

General information
- Type: Residential
- Location: Keppel Bay View
- Coordinates: 1°15′59.72″N 103°48′42.74″E
- Construction started: 8 January 2008; 18 years ago
- Completed: 5 December 2011; 14 years ago
- Owner: Keppel Land and Keppel Corp

Height
- Height: 525 ft (160 m)

Technical details
- Floor count: 41, 24, 11 stories
- Floor area: 84,000 sq m

Design and construction
- Architects: Daniel Libeskind; DCA Architects Pte Ltd
- Main contractor: WOH Hup
- Awards and prizes: FIABCI Prix D’Excellence Awards (Residential High-Rise) in 2013 The Chicago Athenaeum International Architecture Award in 2012 BCA Universal Design Mark Platinum Award in 2013

Reflections at Keppel Bay is a waterfront residential complex in Bukit Merah, Singapore. It was completed in 2011, offering 1129 units with a 99-year leasehold. The six curved glass skyscrapers afford panoramic views of Mount Faber and Sentosa. The complex was designed by Daniel Libeskind, who is known for creating the World Trade Center Memorial masterplan. The local architect was DCA Architects.

== Location ==
Reflections at Keppel Bay is located on Keppel Bay View, off Telok Blangah Road. Neighbouring condominiums are Caribbean at Keppel Bay and Corals at Keppel Bay. The nearest MRT station to the complex is Telok Blangah MRT station, while also within walking distance to the shopping malls HarbourFront Centre and VivoCity. A free shuttle bus for residents to VivoCity which runs at 30-minute intervals, or 15 minutes at peak hours.

== Awards ==
Reflections at Keppel Bay won the FIABCI Prix D’Excellence Awards (Residential High-Rise) in 2013 and The Chicago Athenaeum International Architecture Award in 2012.

Locally, it won the BCA Universal Design Mark Platinum Award in 2013 in recognition of the accessibility features of the condominium, which was highly usable by older people, people without disabilities, and people with disabilities.

== Gallery ==
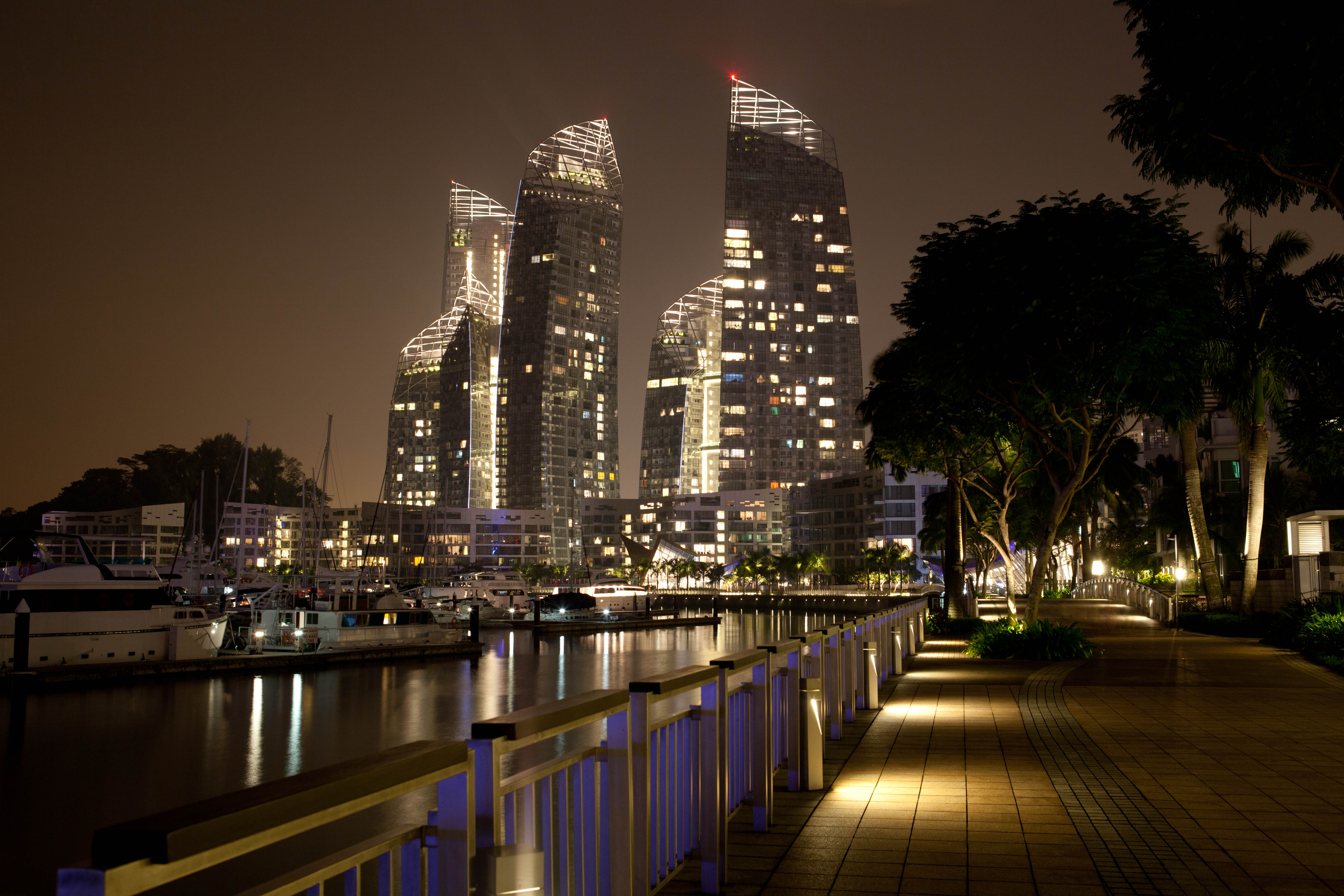
Night Scene
