= The Ascent at Roebling's Bridge =

Residential building in Covington, Kentucky

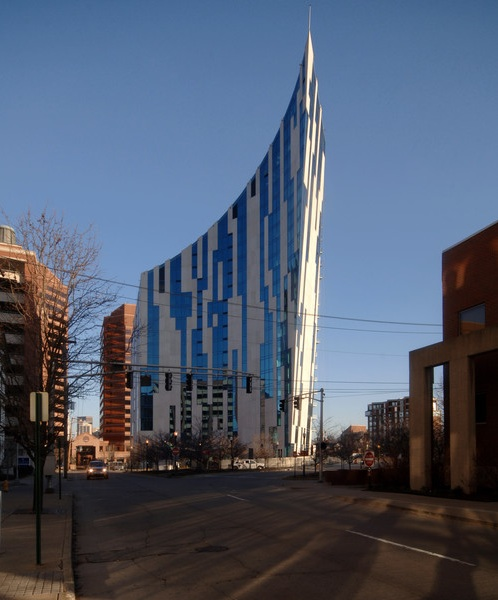

- Location within Kentucky The Ascent at Roebling's Bridge (the United States)

General information
- Status: Completed
- Type: Residential
- Location: 1 Roebling Way, Covington, Kentucky 41011 USA
- Coordinates: 39.0893°N 84.5094°W
- Construction started: November 17, 2005
- Opening: March 2008

Height
- Roof: 89.36 m (293.2 ft)

Technical details
- Floor count: 22

Design and construction
- Architect: Daniel Libeskind
- Developer: GBBN Architects, THP Limited, and KLH Engineering
- Main contractor: Dugan & Meyers Construction Company

The Ascent at Roebling's Bridge is a residential building in Covington, Kentucky, United States, in the greater Cincinnati area. Designed by Daniel Libeskind, the building sits along the Ohio River across from the Roebling Suspension Bridge. It was commissioned in 2004 and was completed in March 2008 at a cost of approximately $50 million. Many newspapers have associated the Ascent with a trend toward signature architecture for residential buildings.

== Design ==
Libeskind cites the Ohio River and the Roebling Bridge as influences for his design. The building stands 293 feet (89 m) tall, 22 stories (comprising a lobby, parking level, amenities level, and 19 floors of luxury condominiums) and ends in a sloped spiral roof. The concrete structure slopes outward from its base on its eastern face and is clad in a glass curtain wall. It houses 70 condominiums.

Studio Daniel Libeskind collaborated with GBBN Architects, THP Limited, and KLH Engineering for the building's construction.
