= Run Run Shaw Creative Media Centre =

Academic building at the City University of Hong Kong

Coordinates: 22.340172°N 114.168461°E

Run Run Shaw Creative Media Centre (CMC)
- 邵逸夫創意媒體中心
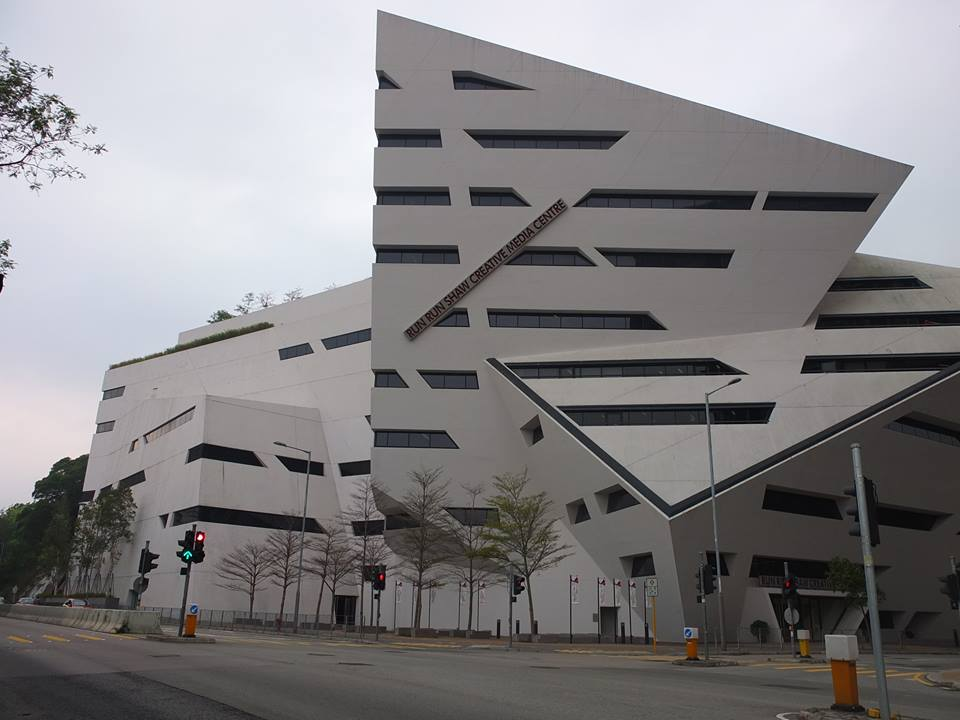
- Run Run Shaw Creative Media Centre, Mar, 2014
- Interactive map of the Run Run Shaw Creative Media Centre (CMC) area

General information
- Status: Completed
- Type: Educational Buildings
- Location: 18 Tat Hong Avenue; Kowloon Tong, Kowloon, Hong Kong
- Opening: Oct 2011
- Owner: City University of Hong Kong
- Operator: City University of Hong Kong

Technical details
- Floor count: 9
- Floor area: 13,400 m^{2} (144,236 sq ft)
- Lifts/elevators: 4+1

Design and construction
- Architects: Studio Daniel Libeskind & Leigh and Orange Ltd
- Main contractor: CR Construction Co. Ltd.

Website
- www.scm.cityu.edu.hk

Run Run Shaw Creative Media Centre is an academic building on the campus of the City University of Hong Kong, which was completed in 2011. It was designed by Daniel Libeskind cooperating with Leigh and Orange Ltd., and received several awards on its design. It was funded with a donation of HK$100 million from the Shaw Foundation and is named after Run Run Shaw. The building houses the university's School of Creative Media, the Centre for Applied Computing and Interactive Media and the computer science, media and communication, and English departments.

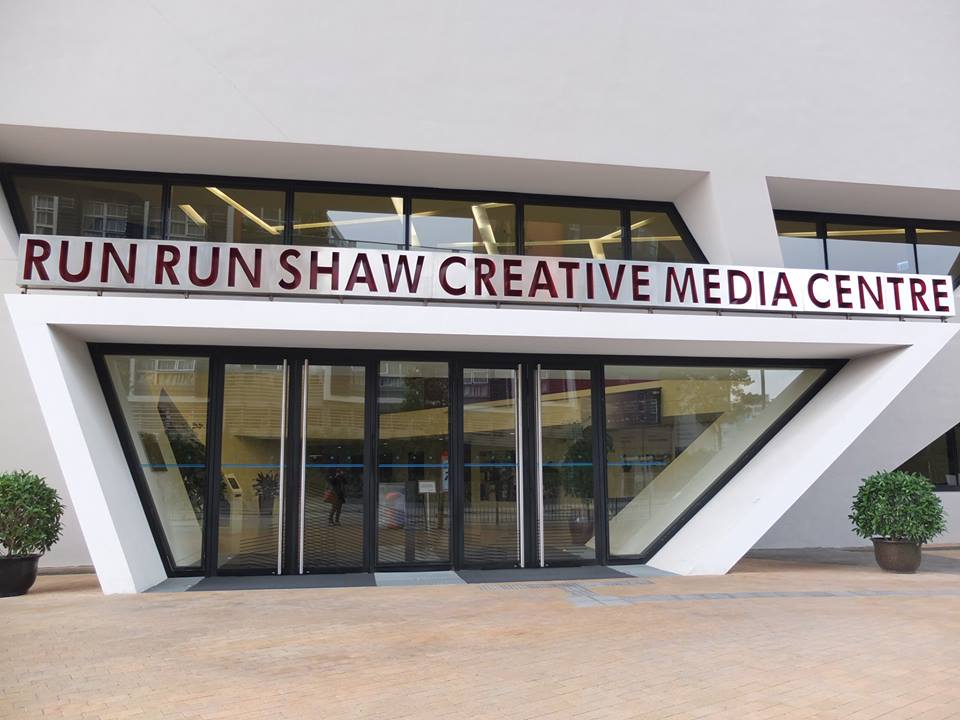
Front gate of the building

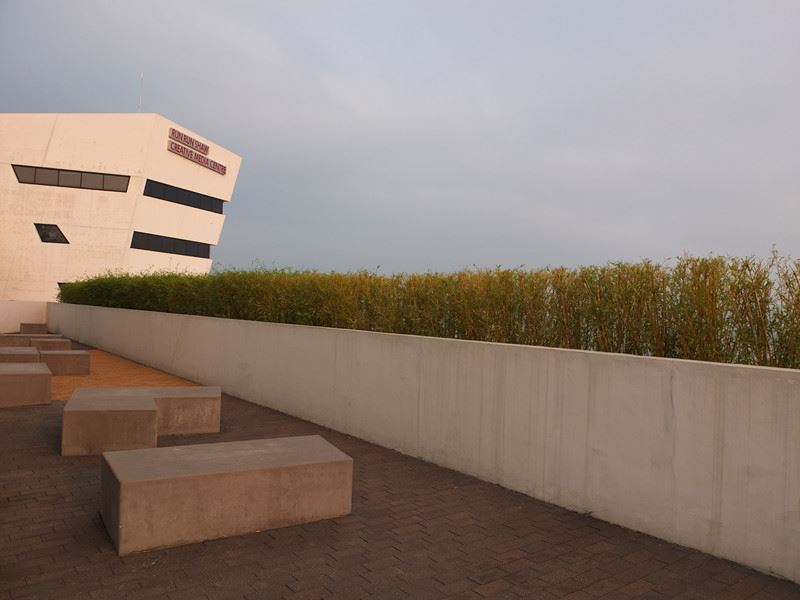
Roof top garden

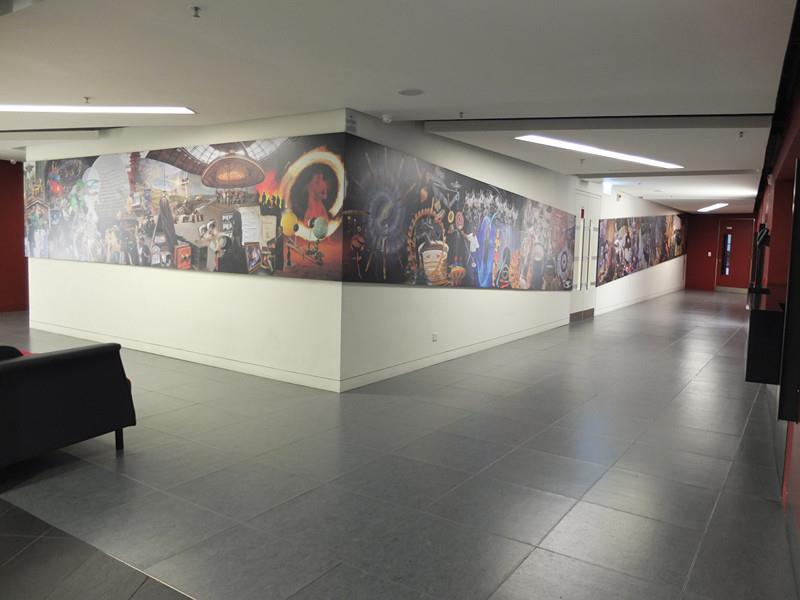
Corridor wall showing "SCMural" by Tjebbe van Tijen
