= Danish Jewish Museum =

Museum in Copenhagen

Coordinates: 55°40′27″N 12°34′56″E

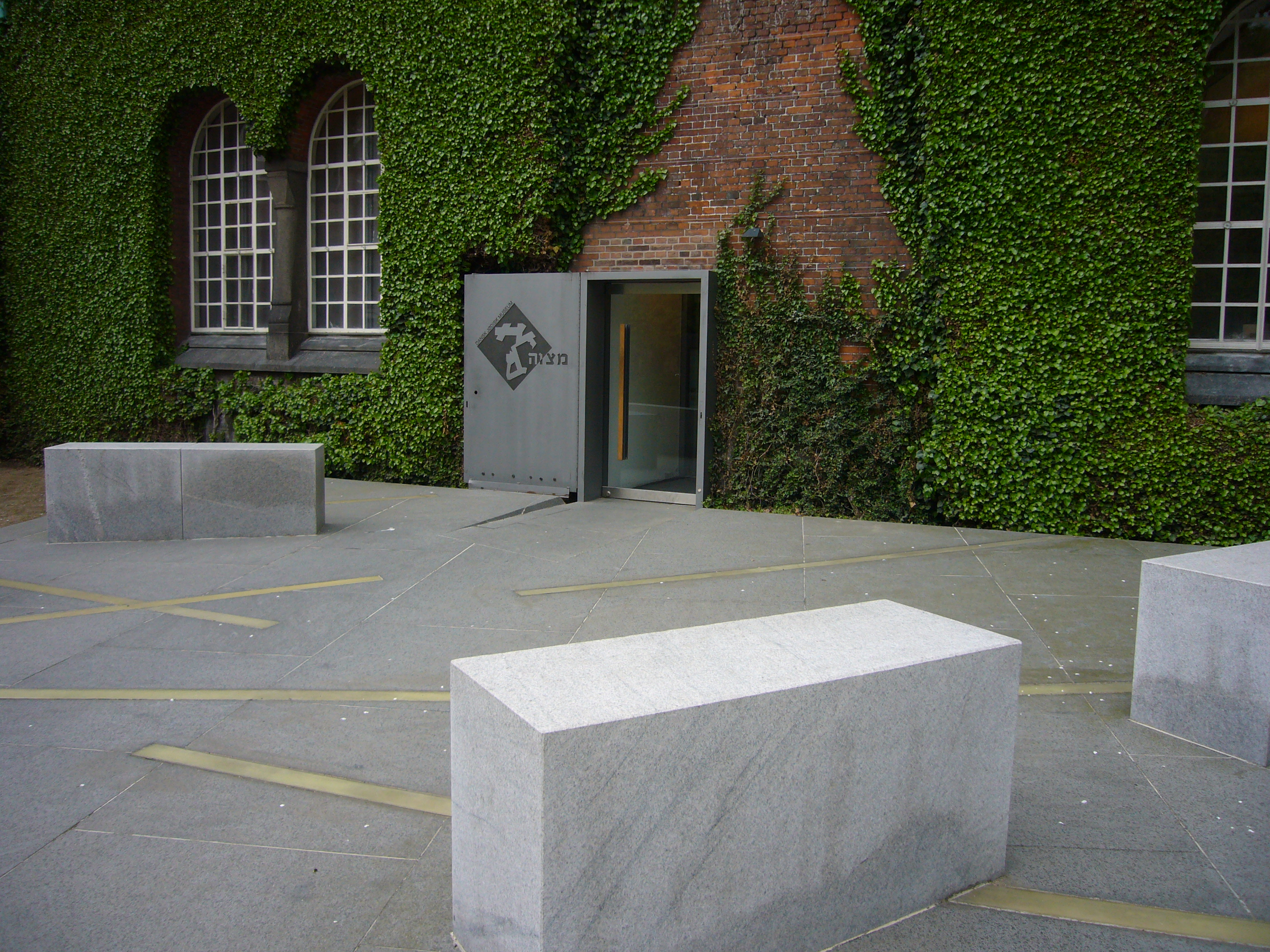
Danish Jewish Museum in Copenhagen.

The Danish Jewish Museum (Danish: Dansk Jødisk Museum), in Copenhagen, Denmark, sits inside the Danish Royal Library’s old Galley House and exhibits Danish Jewish historical artifacts and art. Designed by architect Daniel Libeskind, the building memorializes the story of Danish Jews who were saved from Nazi persecution by their fellow Danes in October 1943. Construction of the Museum began in March 2003 and the museum opened in June 2004.

== History ==
At the turn of the seventeenth century, King Christian IV built Denmark's Royal Boat House, which was later renovated in 1906, during the construction of the adjacent Royal Library. In 1985, the Society for Danish Jewish History decided to establish a museum in Copenhagen dedicated to its namesake. It wasn't until the 1990s, however, that the organization met with Daniel Libeskind and the Royal Library site underwent another transformation. The renovation of the Boat House, executed by Fogh & Følner architects, began in July 2002, and construction of the Danish Jewish Museum ended in September 2003. In June 2004, the museum opened.

== Concept ==
The Museum is the first official museum in Denmark dedicated to a minority or immigrant group. Rather than concentrate on the Holocaust, the museum's board of directors, members of The Society for Danish Jewish History, decided to present the diversity and culture of the Jewish community in Denmark, to highlight the positive and unique aspects of the Jewish story, which dates back to approximately 400 years.

Along with diversity, another theme explored in the museum is inclusiveness: the Danes including Jews in everyday society; the Jewish community opening up to the surrounding society; and consequently the museum reaching out to non-Jewish Danes and non-Jewish foreigners The museum's board had to take into consideration the level of knowledge possessed by the target audience. In particular, they had to find a balance between celebrated events, such as the Rescue of the Danish Jews in October 1943, and less familiar ones.

== Design ==
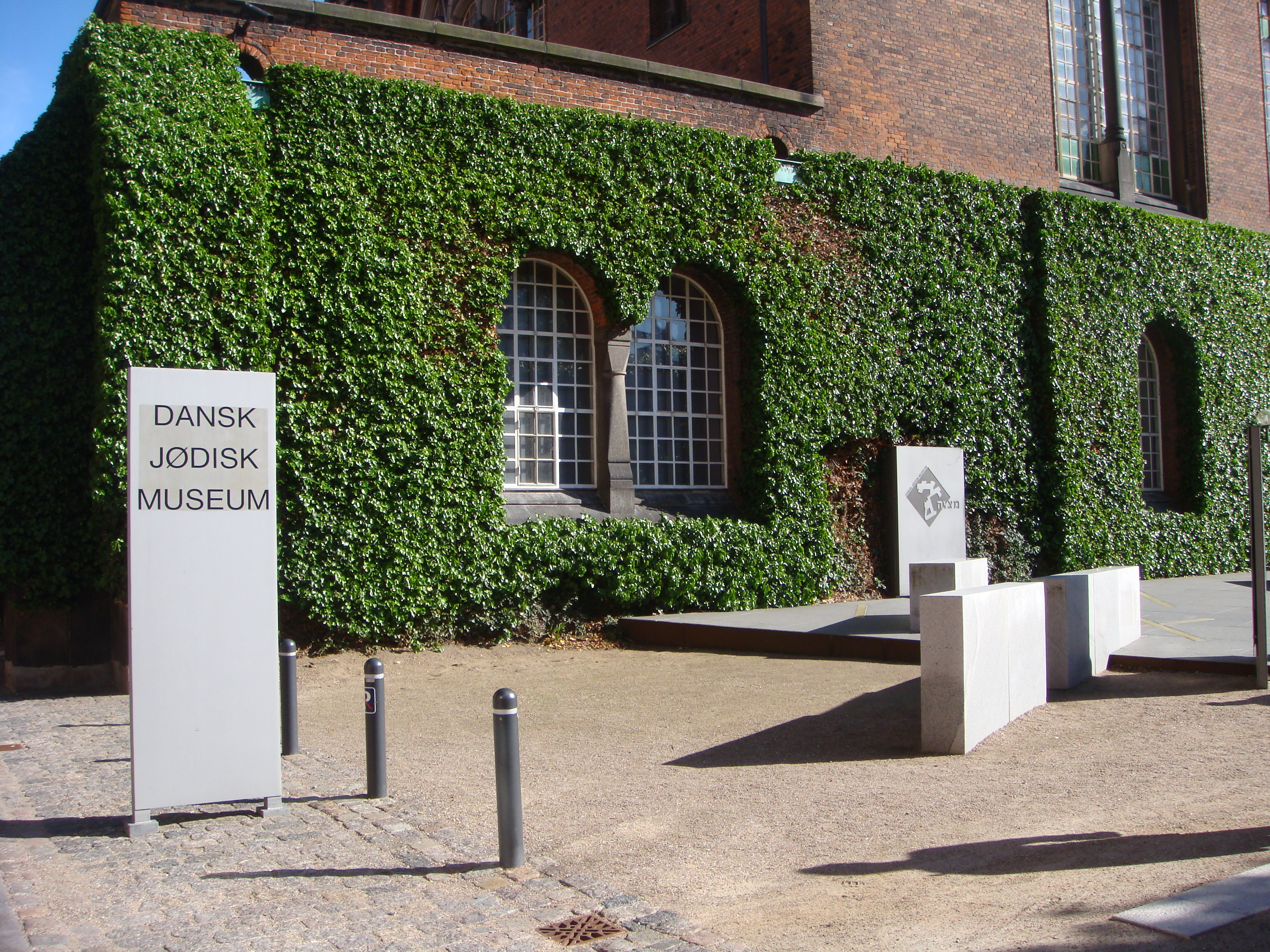
The entrance area

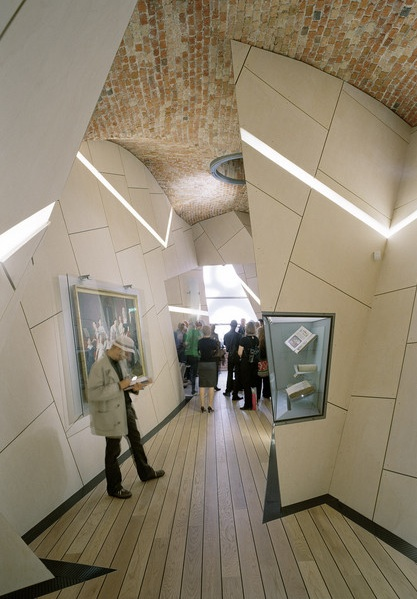
Interior of the Danish Jewish Museum

The space's evolving function influenced Libeskind's design. The museum's layout incorporates a pedestrian walk between the new and old libraries, outdoor summer seating for a café, and intimate conversation spaces at the ground level of the entrance. The whole building is organized as a series of planes, each corresponding to a particular field of religious discourse. Together, the planes, named Exodus, Wilderness, The Giving of the Law, and The Promised Land, carve interior corridors of fractured passageways and slanted floors. These corridors comprise the museum's exhibition spaces and, as they wind, they form the letters for the Hebrew word Mitzvah, meaning “good deed.” According to the museum's website, the form of the building stands as a commentary on the artifacts and artworks it houses, paralleling how accompanying texts often illuminate different aspects of the Talmud. Libeskind describes the space as a “sort of text running within a frame made up of many other surfaces – walls, inner spaces, showcases, virtual perspectives.”

== Content ==
Most of the items on display come from either the Royal Library's Judaica collection or are on loan from the Jewish Community in Copenhagen, Mosaiske Trossamfund.

== Awards ==
- American Architect Award, 2005
