= Daniel Libeskind =

American architect (born 1946)

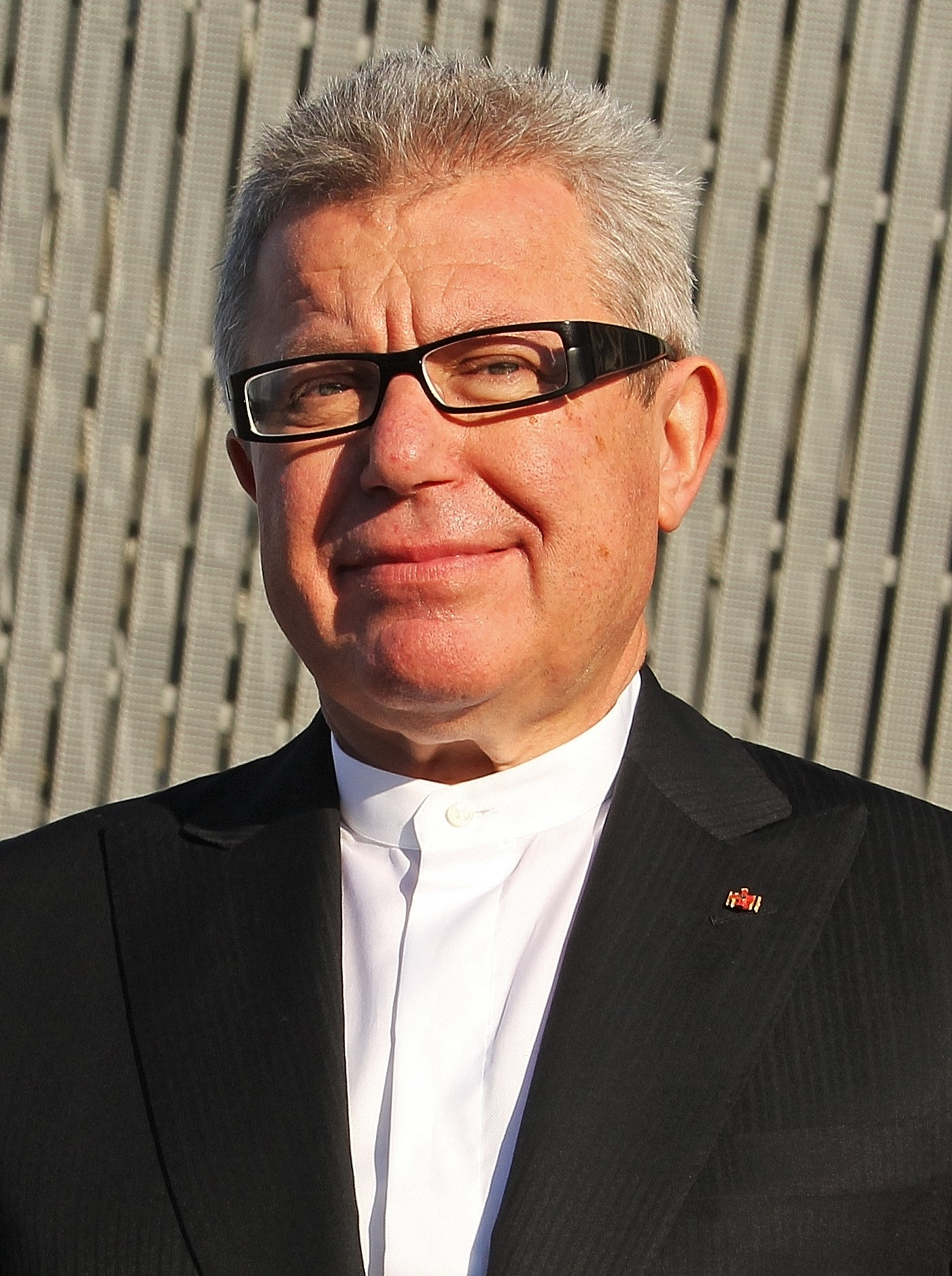
- Libeskind in front of his extension to the Bundeswehr Military History Museum in Dresden, 2011
- Born: May 12, 1946 (age 80); Łódź, Poland
- Education: The Cooper Union for the Advancement of Science and Art; University of Essex
- Occupation: Architect
- Spouse: Nina Lewis Libeskind (m. 1969)
- Children: 3
- Relatives: David Lewis (father-in-law); Stephen Lewis (brother-in-law); Avi Lewis (nephew)
- Practice: Studio Daniel Libeskind
- Buildings: Felix Nussbaum Haus; Jewish Museum Berlin; Imperial War Museum North; Contemporary Jewish Museum; Royal Ontario Museum (expansion); One World Trade Center (2002); The Ascent at Roebling's Bridge
- Website: libeskind.com

Daniel Libeskind (born May 12, 1946) is a Polish and American architect, artist, professor, and set designer. Libeskind founded Studio Daniel Libeskind in 1989 with his wife, Nina, and is its principal design architect. He is known for the design and completion of the Jewish Museum in Berlin, Germany, that opened in 2001. In 2003, Libeskind received further international attention after he won the competition to be the master plan architect for the reconstruction of the World Trade Center site in Lower Manhattan.

Other buildings that he is known for include the extension to the Denver Art Museum in the United States, the Grand Canal Theatre in Dublin, the Imperial War Museum North in Greater Manchester, England, the Michael Lee-Chin Crystal at the Royal Ontario Museum in Toronto, Canada, the Felix Nussbaum Haus in Osnabrück, Germany, the Danish Jewish Museum in Copenhagen, Denmark, Reflections in Singapore and the Wohl Centre at the Bar-Ilan University in Ramat Gan, Israel. His portfolio also includes several residential projects. Libeskind's work has been exhibited in major museums and galleries around the world, including the Museum of Modern Art, the Bauhaus Archives, the Art Institute of Chicago, and the Centre Pompidou.

== Early life and education ==
Daniel Libeskind was born May 12, 1946, in Łódź, Poland. He is the second child of Dora and Nachman Libeskind, both Polish Jews and Holocaust survivors. As a young child, Libeskind learned to play the accordion and quickly became a virtuoso, performing on Polish television in 1953. He won a America Israel Cultural Foundation scholarship in 1959 and played alongside a young Itzhak Perlman. Libeskind lived in Poland for 11 years and says "I can still speak, read and write Polish."

In 1957, the Libeskinds moved to Israel, settling in Kibbutz Gvat and Tel Aviv. In his autobiography, Breaking Ground: An Immigrant's Journey from Poland to Ground Zero, Libeskind spoke of how the kibbutz experience influenced his concern for green architecture.

In the summer of 1959, his family moved to New York City on one of the last immigrant boats to the United States. In New York, Libeskind lived in the Amalgamated Housing Cooperative in Van Cortlandt Village, Bronx, a union-sponsored, middle-income cooperative development. He attended the Bronx High School of Science. The print shop where his father worked was on Stone Street in Lower Manhattan, and he watched the original World Trade Center being built in the 1960s. Libeskind became a United States citizen in 1965.

Daniel Libeskind was accepted at Cooper Union for the Advancement of Science and Art and began school there in 1965 where he was taught by John Hejduk and received his professional architectural degree in 1970. In 1968, Libeskind briefly worked as an apprentice to architect Richard Meier. He received a postgraduate degree in history and theory of architecture at the School of Comparative Studies at the University of Essex in 1972. The same year, he was hired to work at Peter Eisenman's New York Institute for Architecture and Urban Studies, but he quit almost immediately.

== Career ==
Libeskind began his career as an architectural theorist and professor, holding positions at various institutions around the world. From 1978 to 1985, Libeskind was the director of the Architecture Department at Cranbrook Academy of Art in Bloomfield Hills, Michigan. His practical architectural career began in Milan in the late 1980s, where he submitted to architectural competitions and also founded and directed Architecture Intermundium, Institute for Architecture & Urbanism.

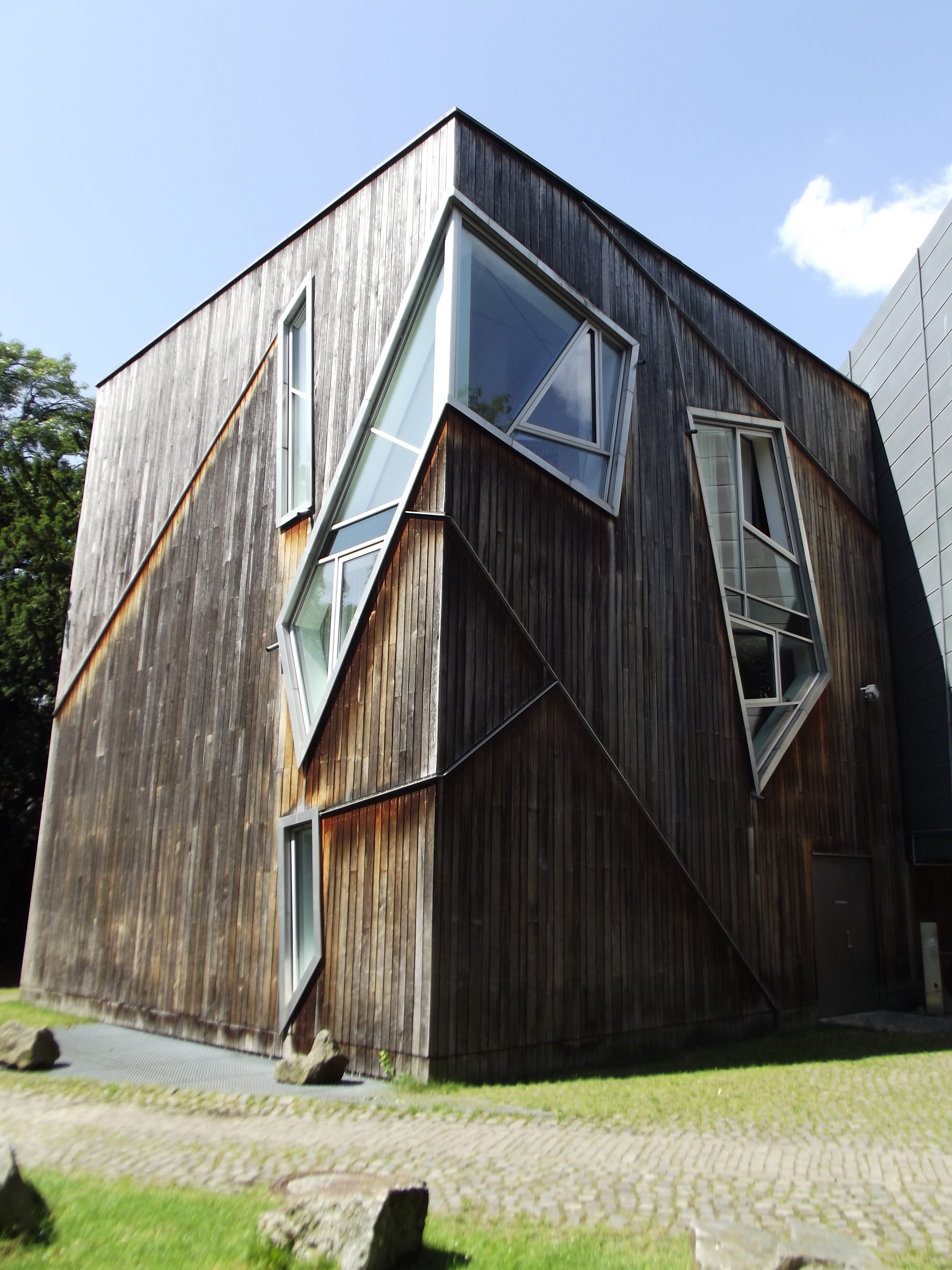
Felix Nussbaum Haus (1998), Osnabrück, Germany

Libeskind completed his first building at the age of 52, with the opening of the Felix Nussbaum Haus in Osnabrück, Germany in 1998. Prior to this, critics had dismissed his designs as "unbuildable or unduly assertive". In 1987, Libeskind won his first design competition for housing in West Berlin, but the Berlin Wall fell shortly thereafter and the project was cancelled. Libeskind won the first four project competitions he entered including the Jewish Museum Berlin in 1989, which became the first museum dedicated to the Holocaust in WWII and opened to the public in 2001 with international acclaim. This was his first major international success and was one of the first building modifications designed after reunification. A glass courtyard was designed by Libeskind and added in 2007. The Academy of the Jewish Museum Berlin also designed by Libeskind was completed in 2012.

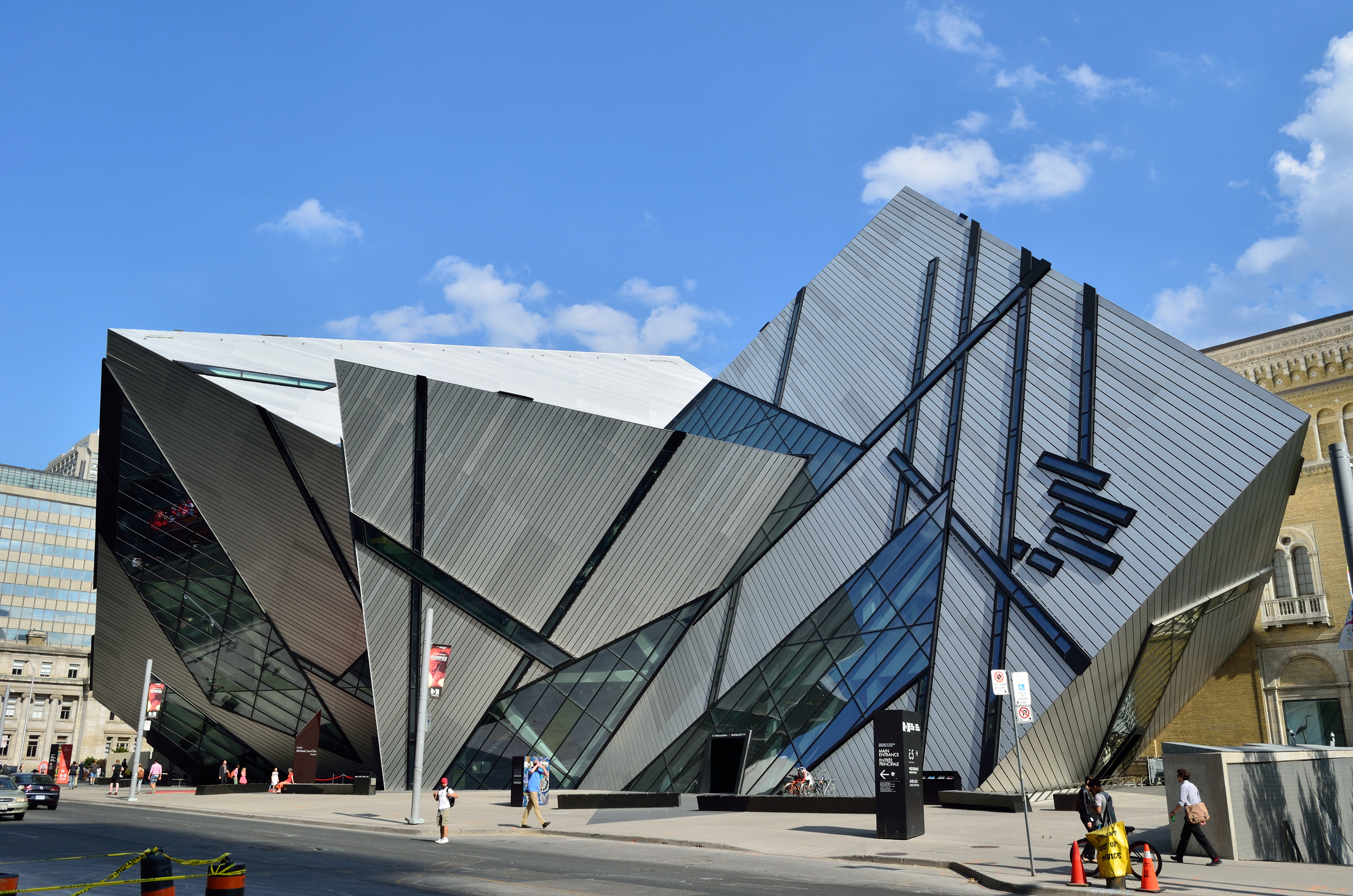
Libeskind's addition to the Royal Ontario Museum in Toronto (2007)

Libeskind was selected by the Lower Manhattan Development Corporation to oversee the rebuilding of the World Trade Center, which was destroyed in the September 11, 2001 attacks. The concept for the site, which he titled Memory Foundations, was well-received upon its presentation to the public in 2003, although it was ultimately changed significantly before its execution. He was the first architect to win the Hiroshima Art Prize, awarded to an artist whose work promotes international understanding and peace. Many of his projects look at the deep cultural connections between memory and architecture.

Studio Daniel Libeskind is headquartered two blocks south of the World Trade Center site in New York. He has designed numerous cultural and commercial institutions, museums, concert halls, convention centers, universities, residences, hotels, and shopping centers. The studio's most recent completed projects include the MO Museum in Vilnius, Lithuania; Zlota 44, a high-rise residential tower in Warsaw, Poland; the Ogden Centre for Fundamental Physics at Durham University in Durham, England; the National Holocaust Monument in Ottawa, Canada; and Corals at Keppel Bay in Singapore, adjacent to the studio's previous completed project Reflections at Keppel Bay.

=== Design objects ===
In addition to his architectural projects, Libeskind has worked with a number of international design firms to develop objects, furniture, and industrial fixtures for interiors of buildings. He has been commissioned to work with design companies such as Fiam, Artemide, Jacuzzi, TreP-Tre-Piu, Oliviari, Sawaya & Moroni, Poltrona Frau, Swarovski, and others.

=== Sculpture and installations ===
Libeskind's design projects also include sculpture. Several sculptures built in the early 1990s were based on the explorations of his Micromegas and Chamberworks drawings series that he did in the late 1970s and early 1980s. The Polderland Garden of Love and Fire in Almere, Netherlands is a permanent installation completed in 1997 and restored on October 4, 2017. Later in his career, Libeskind designed the Life Electric sculpture that was completed in 2015 on Lake Como, Italy. This sculpture is dedicated to the physicist Alessandro Volta.

=== Opera and verse ===
Libeskind has designed opera sets for productions such as the Norwegian National Theatre's The Architect in 1998 and Saarländisches Staatstheater's Tristan und Isolde in 2001. He also designed the sets and costumes for Intolleranza by Luigi Nono and for a production of Messiaen's Saint Francis of Assisi by Deutsche Oper Berlin. He has also written free verse prose, included in his book Fishing from the Pavement.

== Academia ==
Daniel Libeskind was the Head of the Architecture Department at Cranbrook Academy of Art in Bloomfield Hills, Michigan from 1978 to 1985. He produced exhibitions, several essays and books, suites of drawings, and large-scale explorations like the three machines (Reading Machine, Writing Machine and Memory Machine). The machines, produced with his Cranbrook graduate students during the 1984–85 academic year, called the Three Lessons in Architecture were displayed at the Venice Biennale in 1985. Libeskind and the group won a Stone Lion award for the work.

Libeskind has taught at several universities, including the University of Kentucky, Yale University, UCLA, Harvard, the University of London, and the University of Pennsylvania. He continues to teach students at various universities including the Catholic University of America.

== Criticism ==
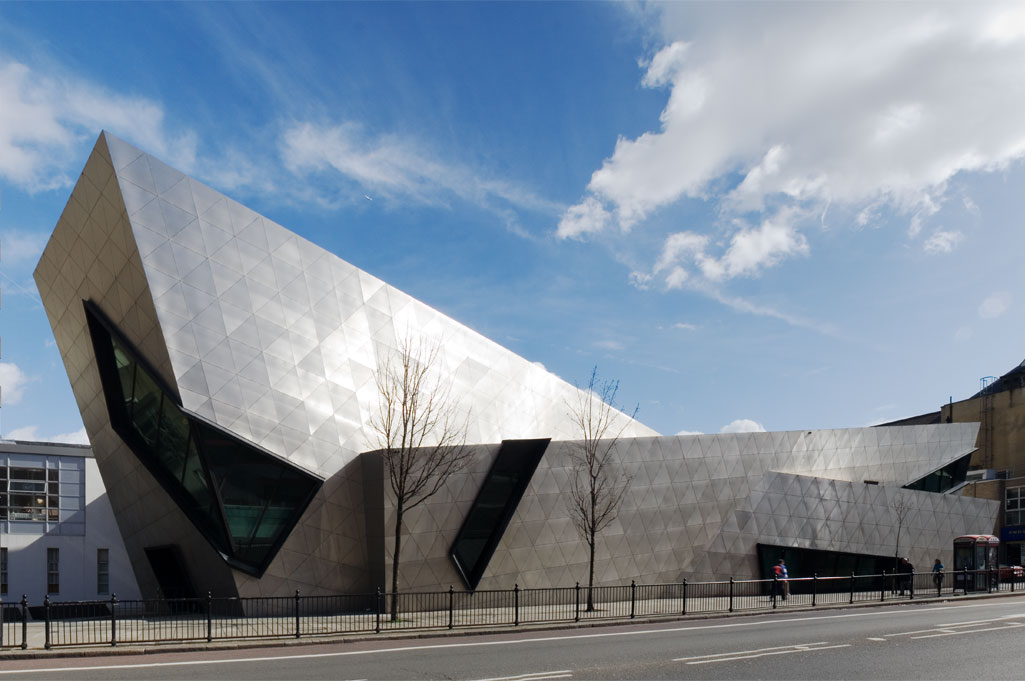
Libeskind's building for the London Metropolitan University has been the subject of criticism.

His work is inscribed within the loosely-defined style of deconstructivism. While much of Libeskind's work has been well-received, it has also been the subject of often severe criticism. Critics charge that it reflects a limited architectural vocabulary of jagged edges, sharp angles and tortured geometries, that can fall into cliche, and that it ignores location and context. In 2008 Los Angeles Times critic Christopher Hawthorne wrote: "Anyone looking for signs that Daniel Libeskind's work might deepen profoundly over time, or shift in some surprising direction, has mostly been doing so in vain." Nicolai Ouroussoff stated in The New York Times in 2006: "His worst buildings, like a 2002 war museum in England suggesting the shards of a fractured globe, can seem like a caricature of his own aesthetic." In the UK magazine Building Design, Owen Hatherley wrote of Libeskind's students' union for London Metropolitan University: "All of its vaulting, aggressive gestures were designed to 'put London Met on the map', and to give an image of fearless modernity with, however, little of consequence." William JR Curtis in Architectural Review called his Run Run Shaw Creative Media Centre "a pile-up of Libeskindian clichés without sense, form or meaning" and wrote that his Hyundai Development Corporation Headquarters delivered "a trite and noisy corporate message".

In response, Libeskind says that he ignores critics: "How can I read them? I have more important things to read."

== Work ==
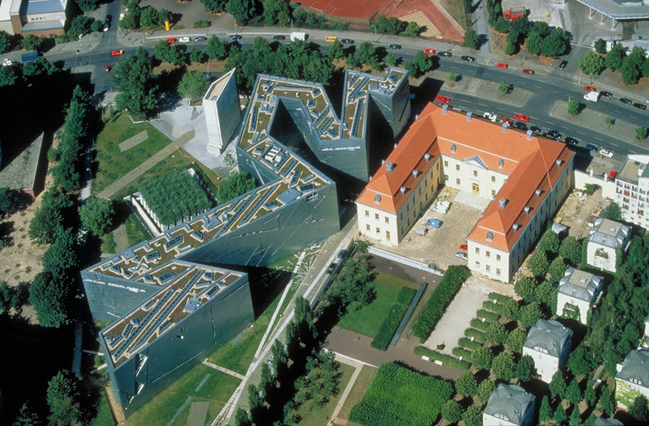
Jewish Museum Berlin, Germany

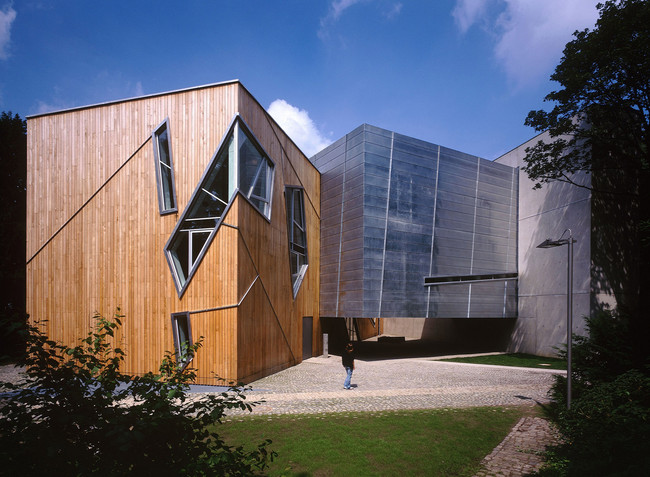
Felix Nussbaum Haus, Osnabrück, Germany

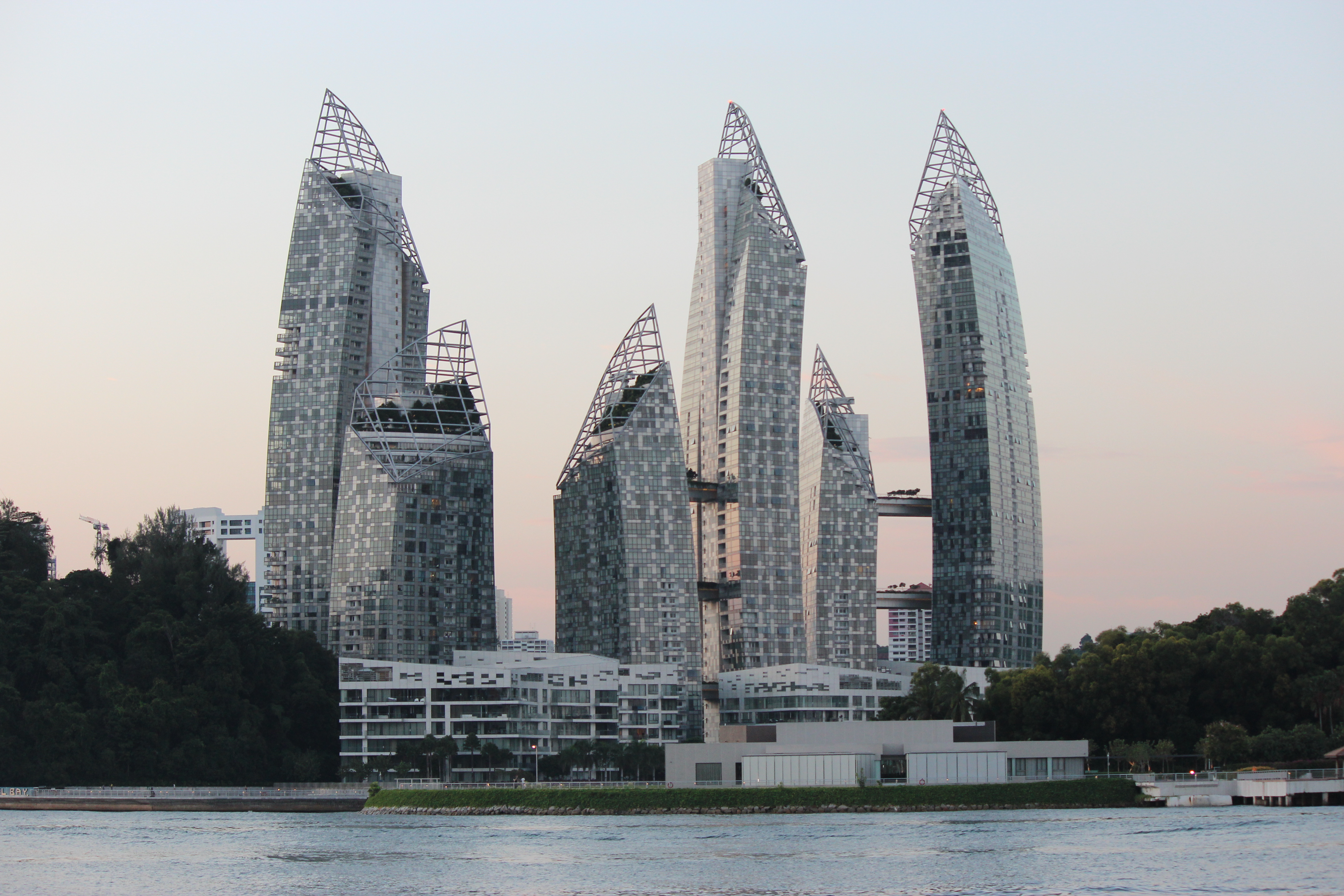
Reflections at Keppel Bay, Singapore

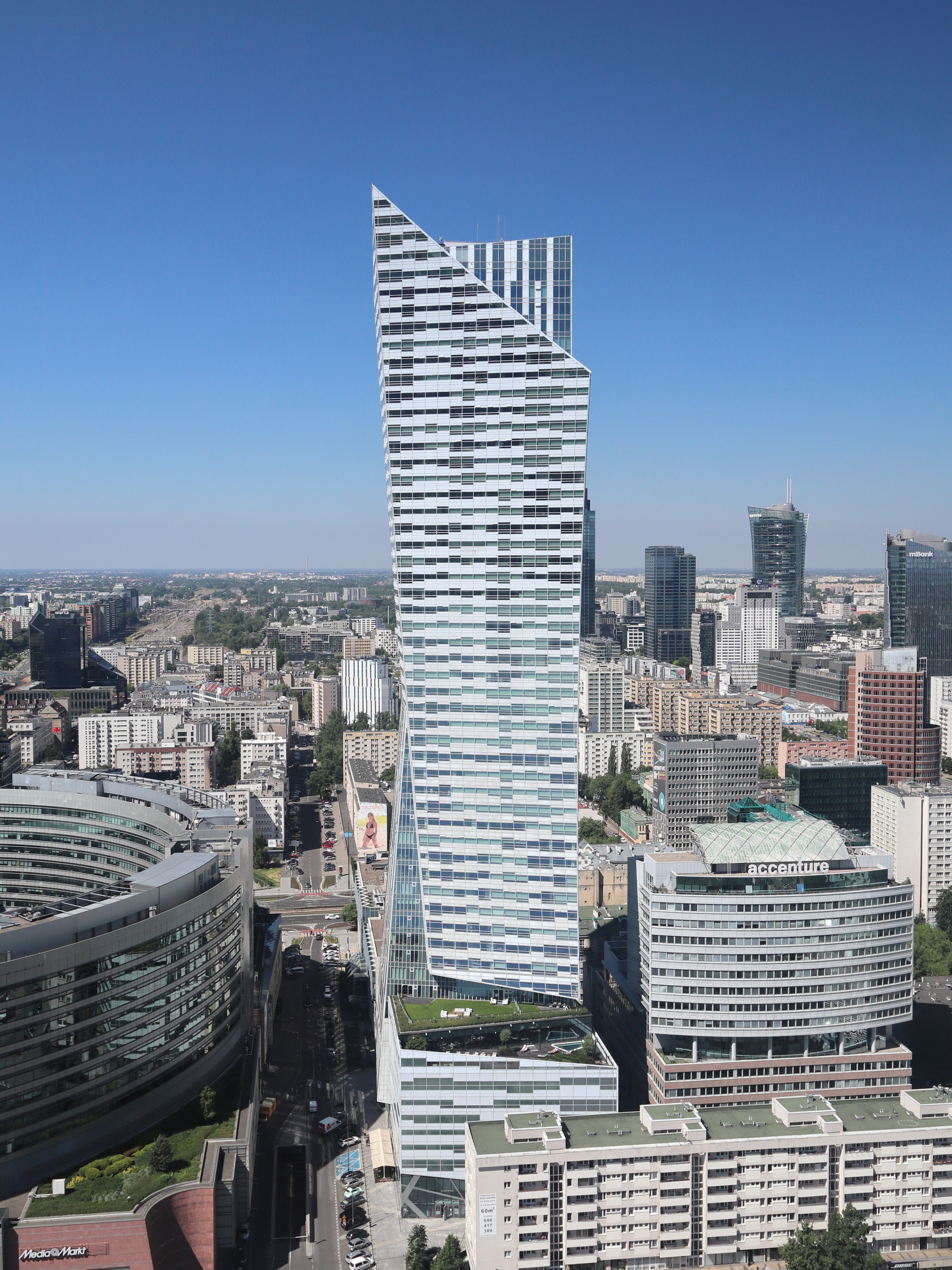
Zlota 44, Warsaw, Poland

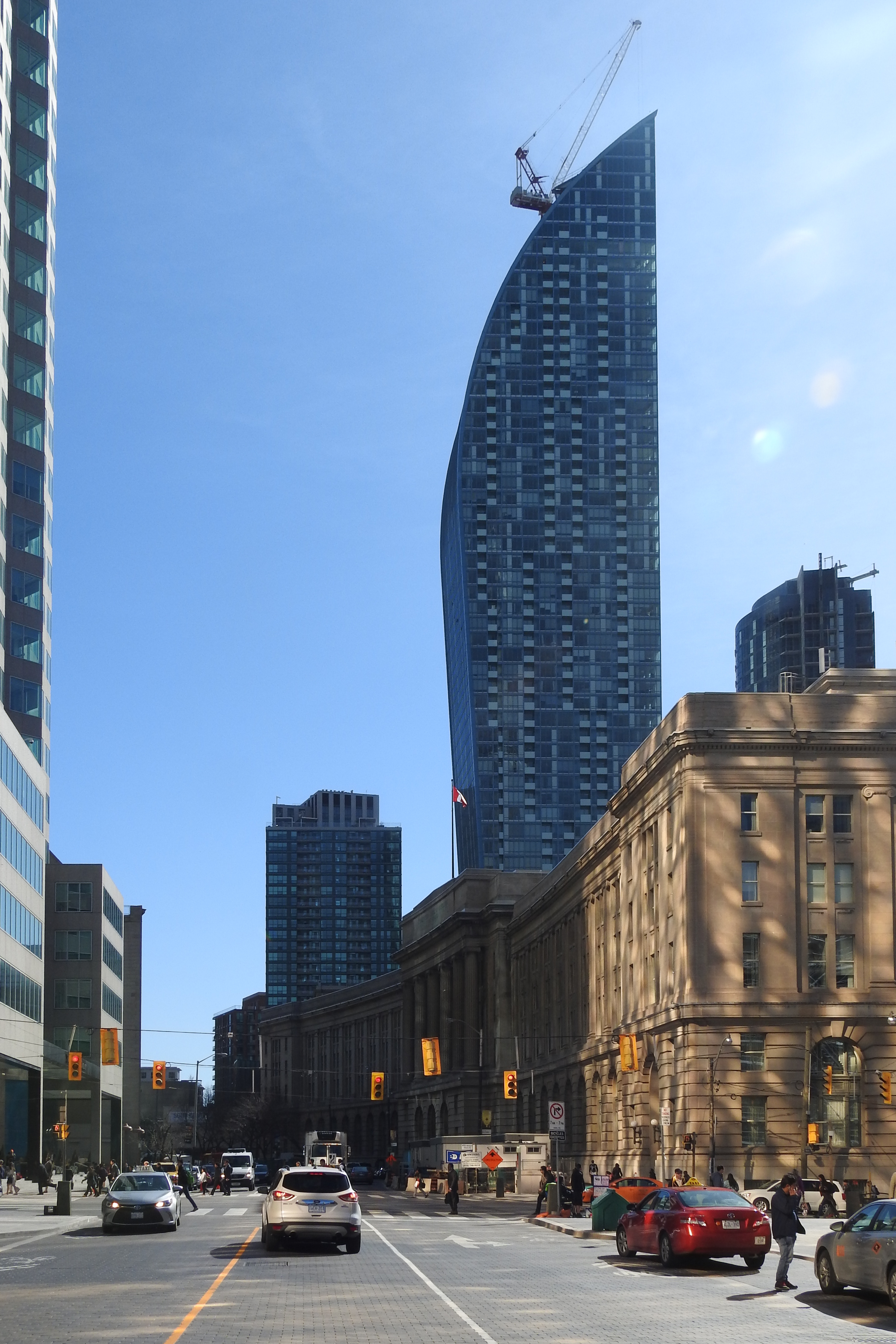
L Tower in Toronto, Canada

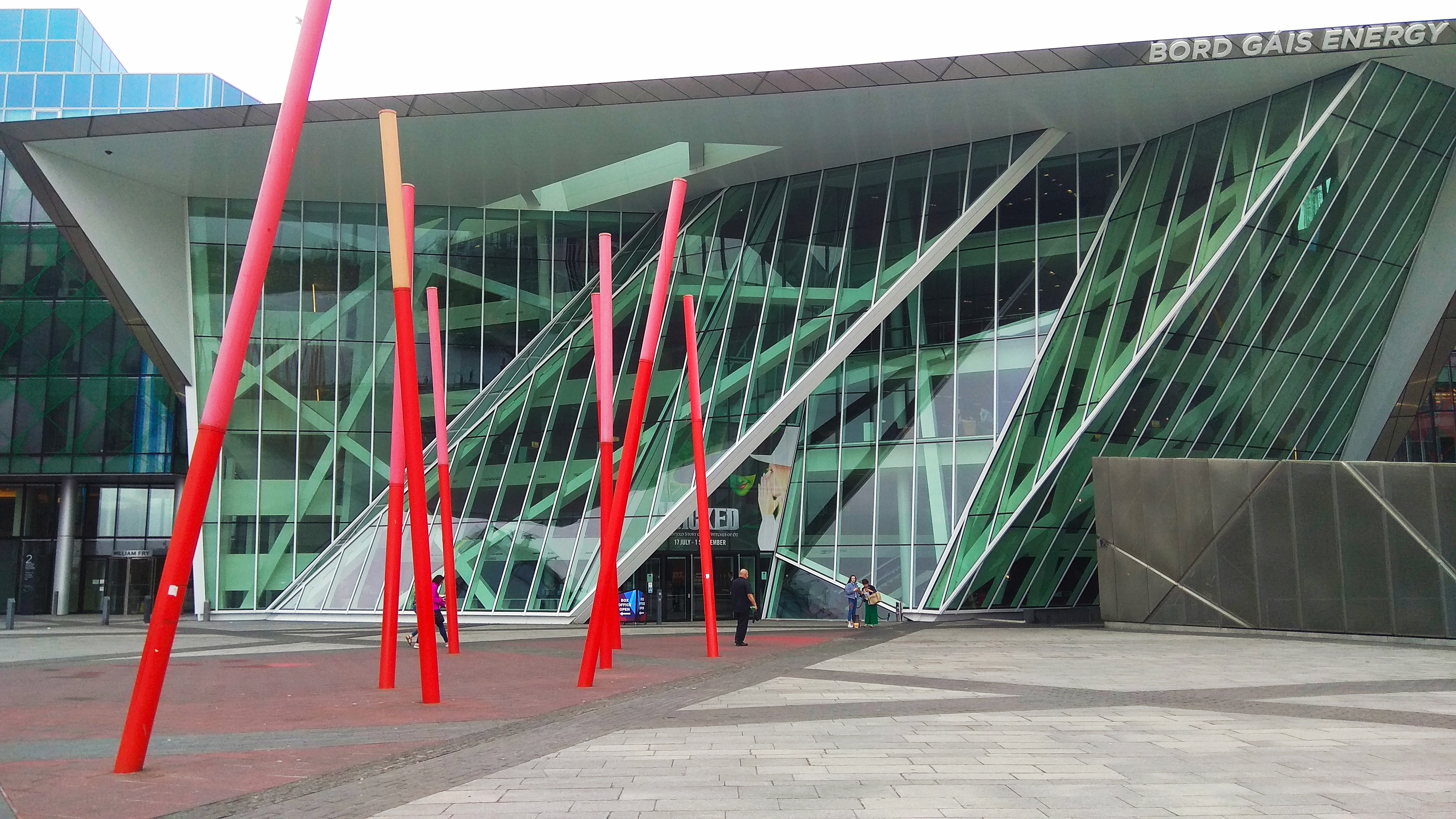
Bord Gáis Energy Theatre, Dublin, Ireland

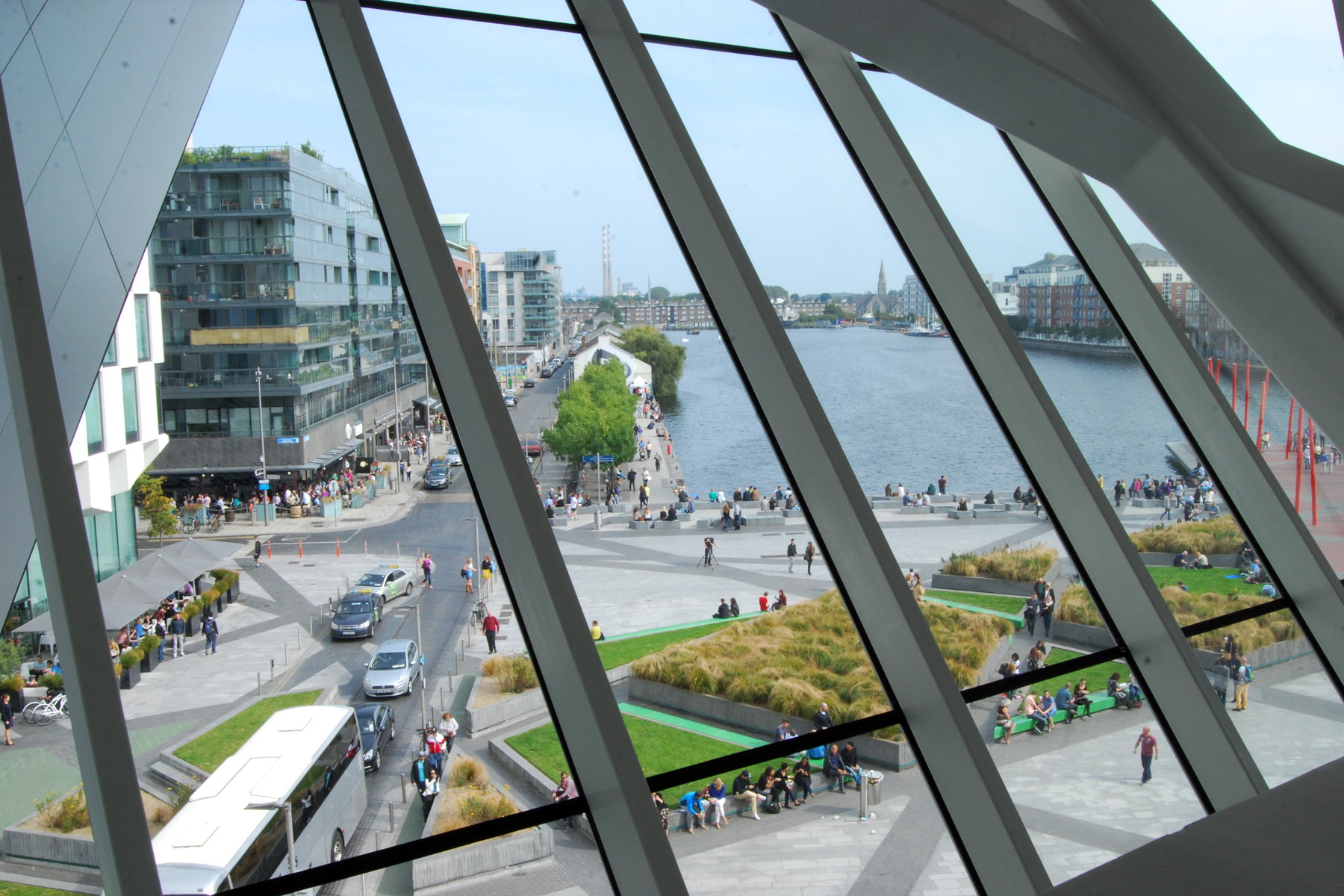
Bord Gais Theatre, Dublin, Ireland

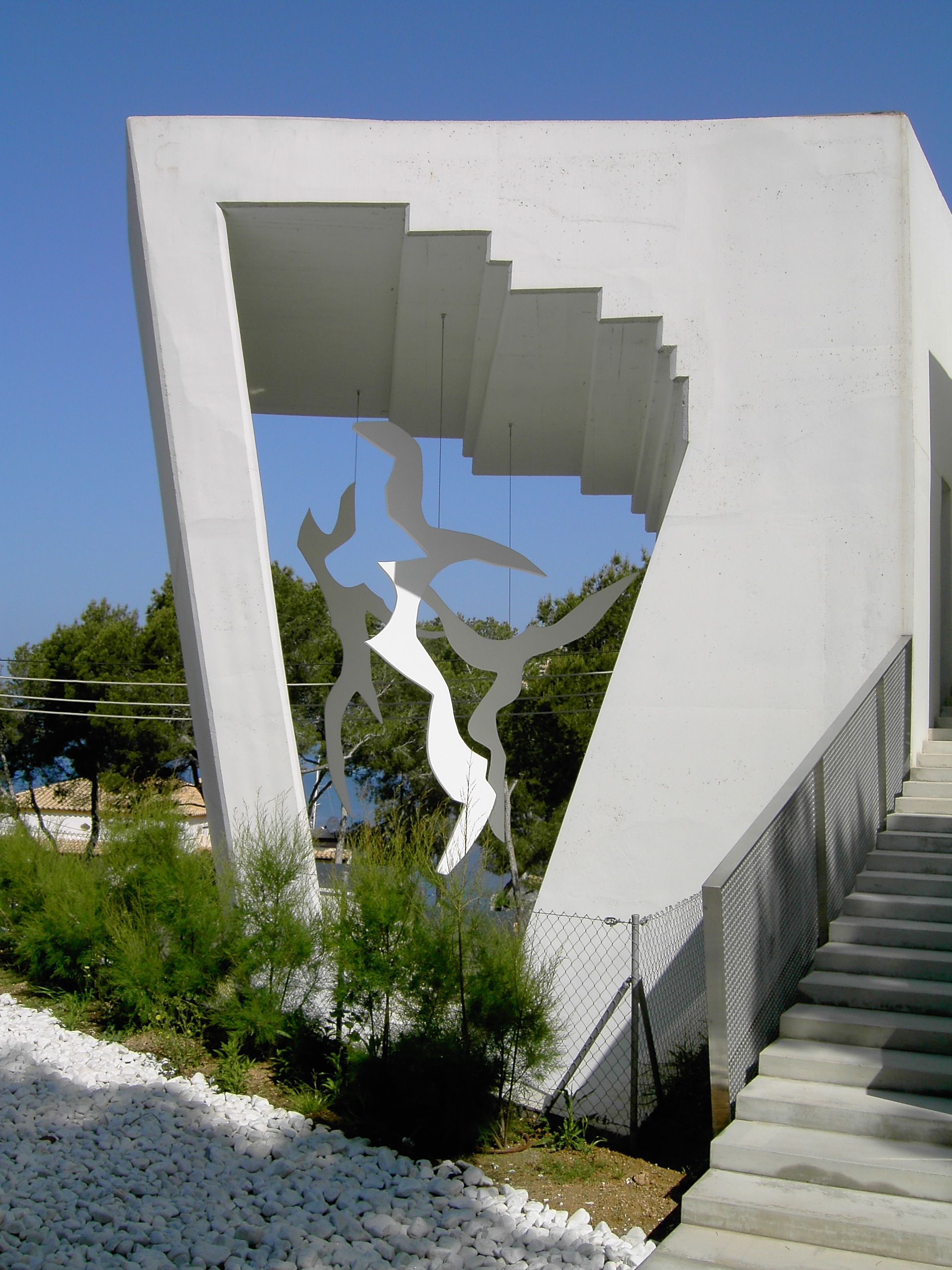
Studio Weil, Mallorca, Spain

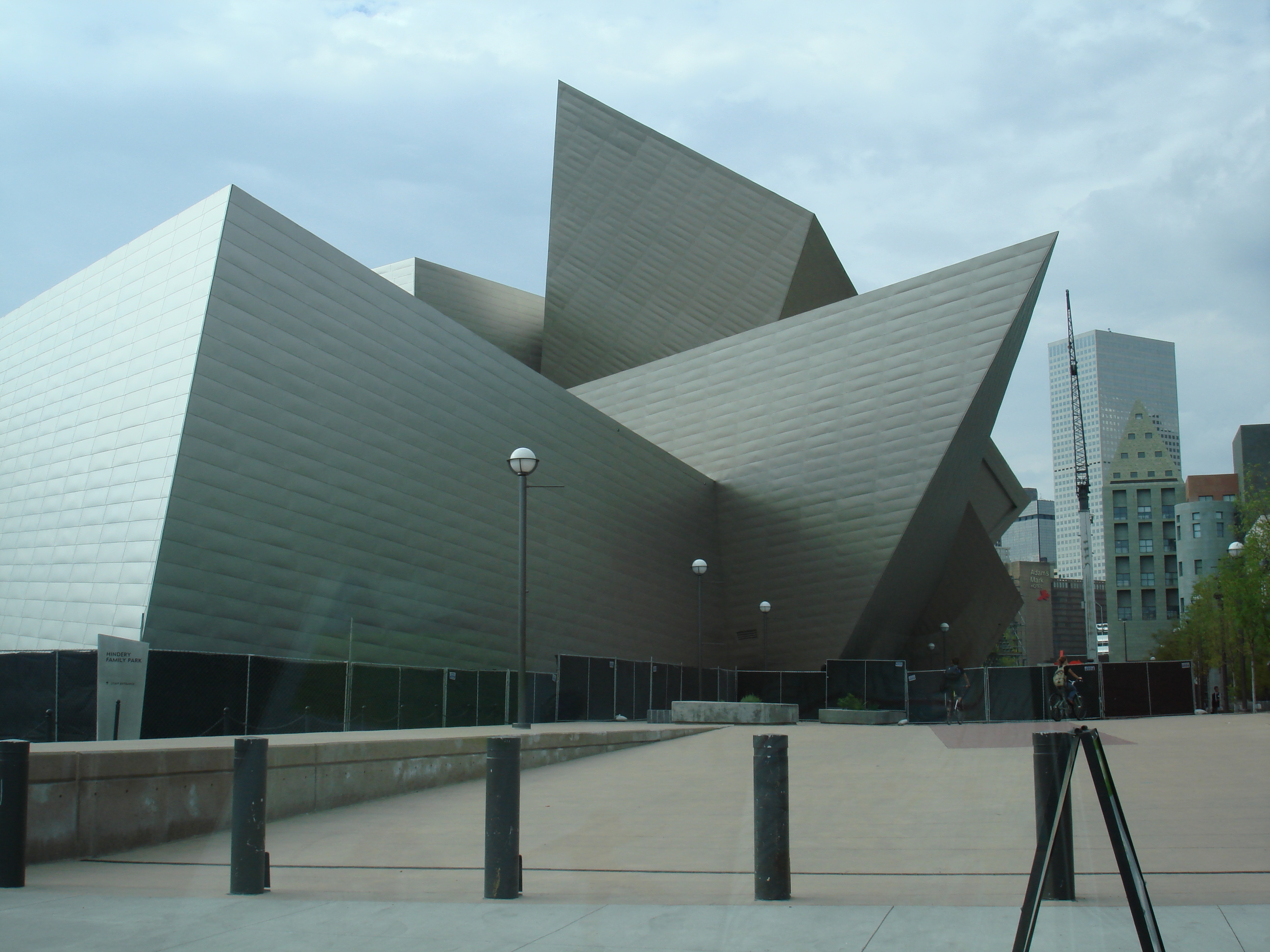
Denver Art Museum, Denver, Colorado, US

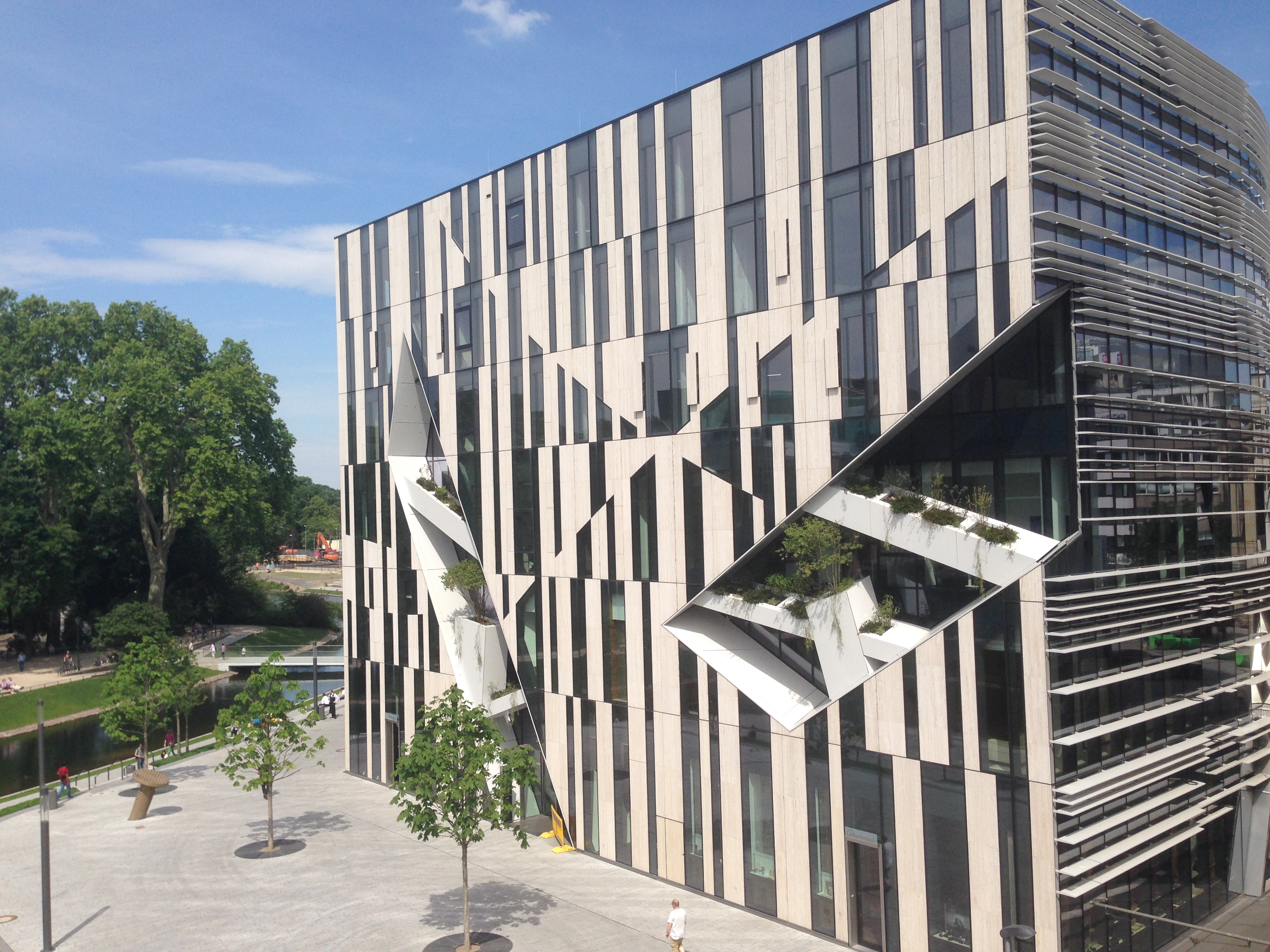
Kö-Bogen Düsseldorf, Germany

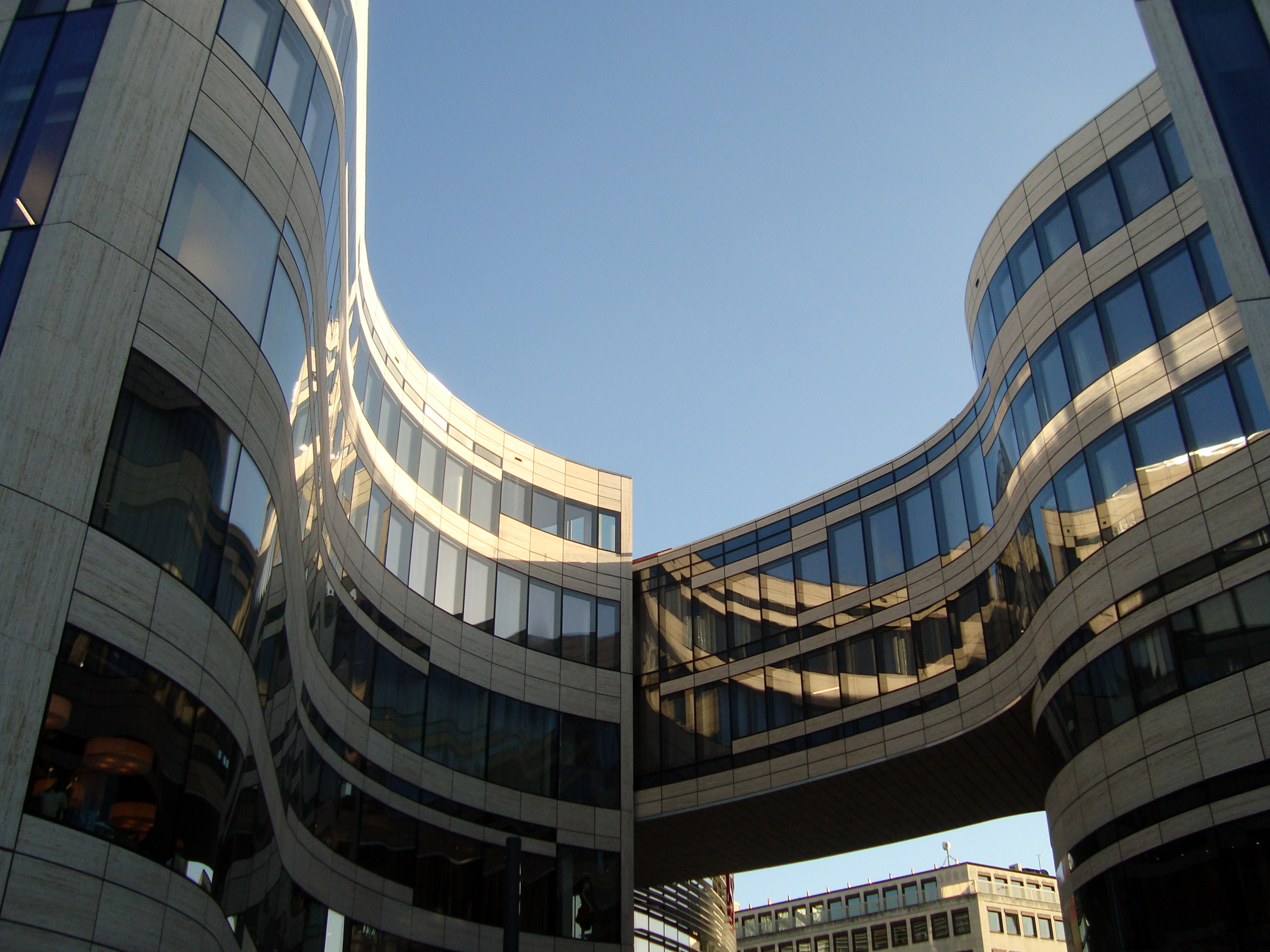
Kö-Bogen Düsseldorf, Germany

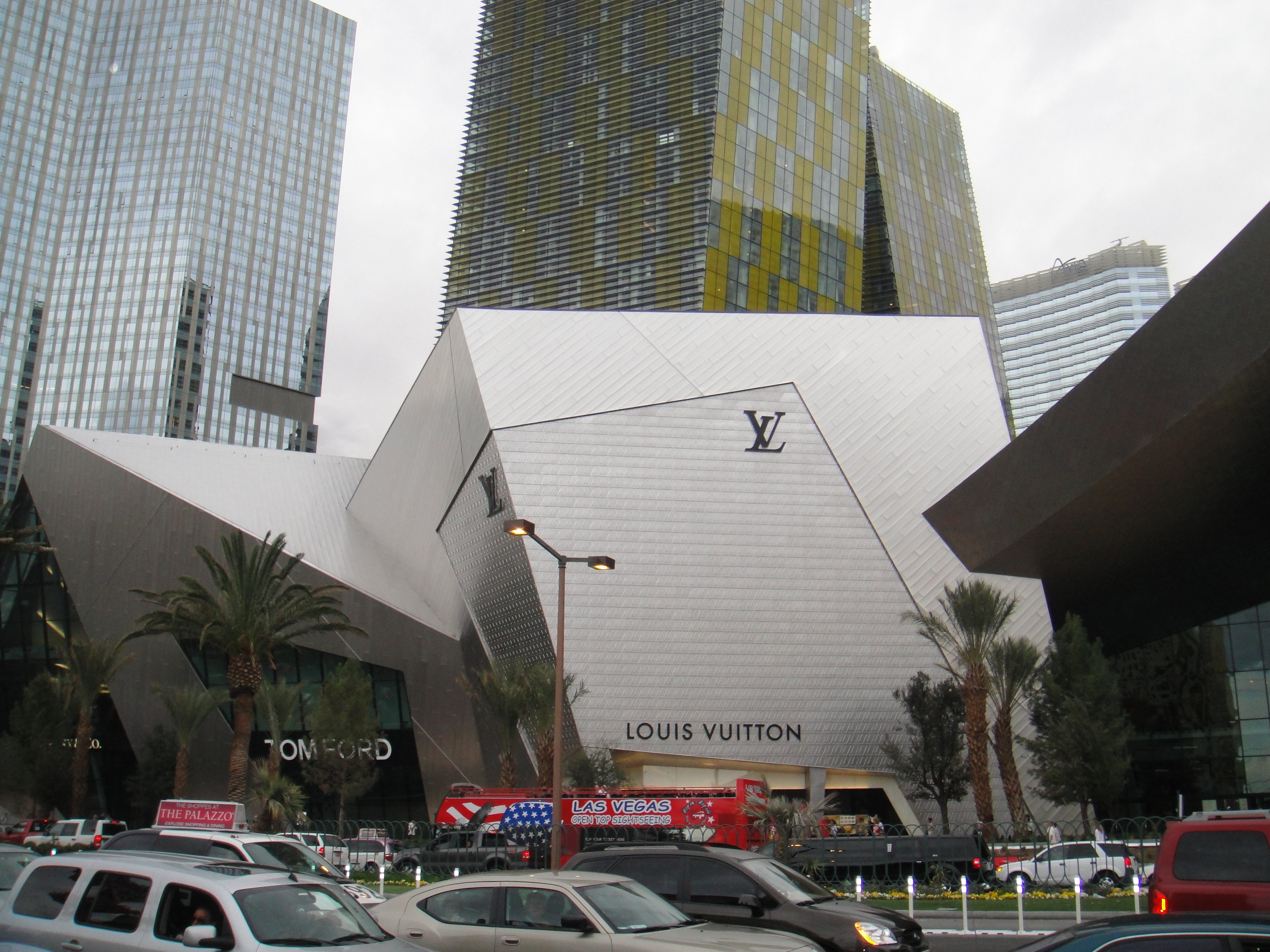
Crystals at CityCenter, Las Vegas, Nevada, US

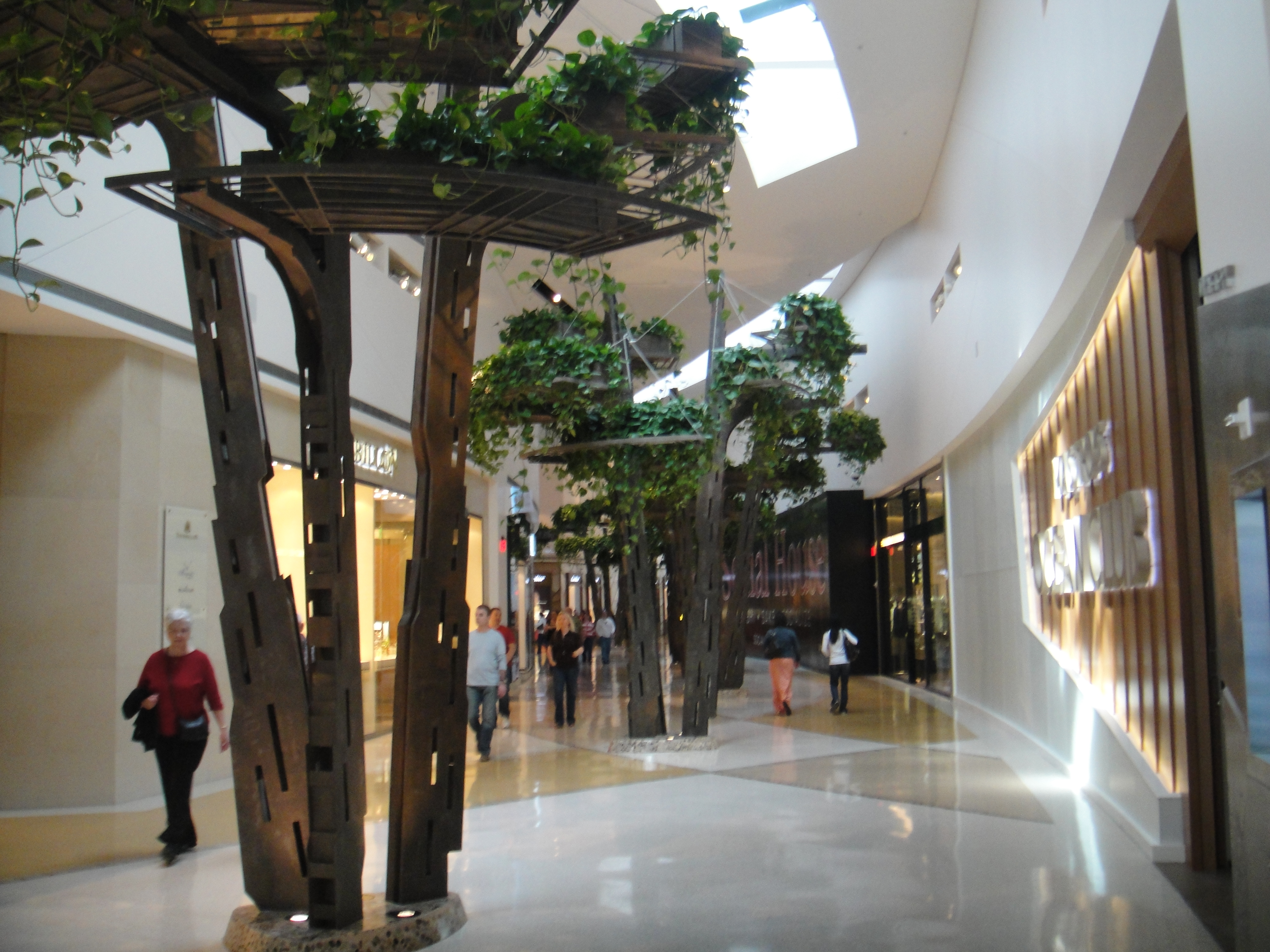
Interior at Crystals at CityCenter, Las Vegas, Nevada, US

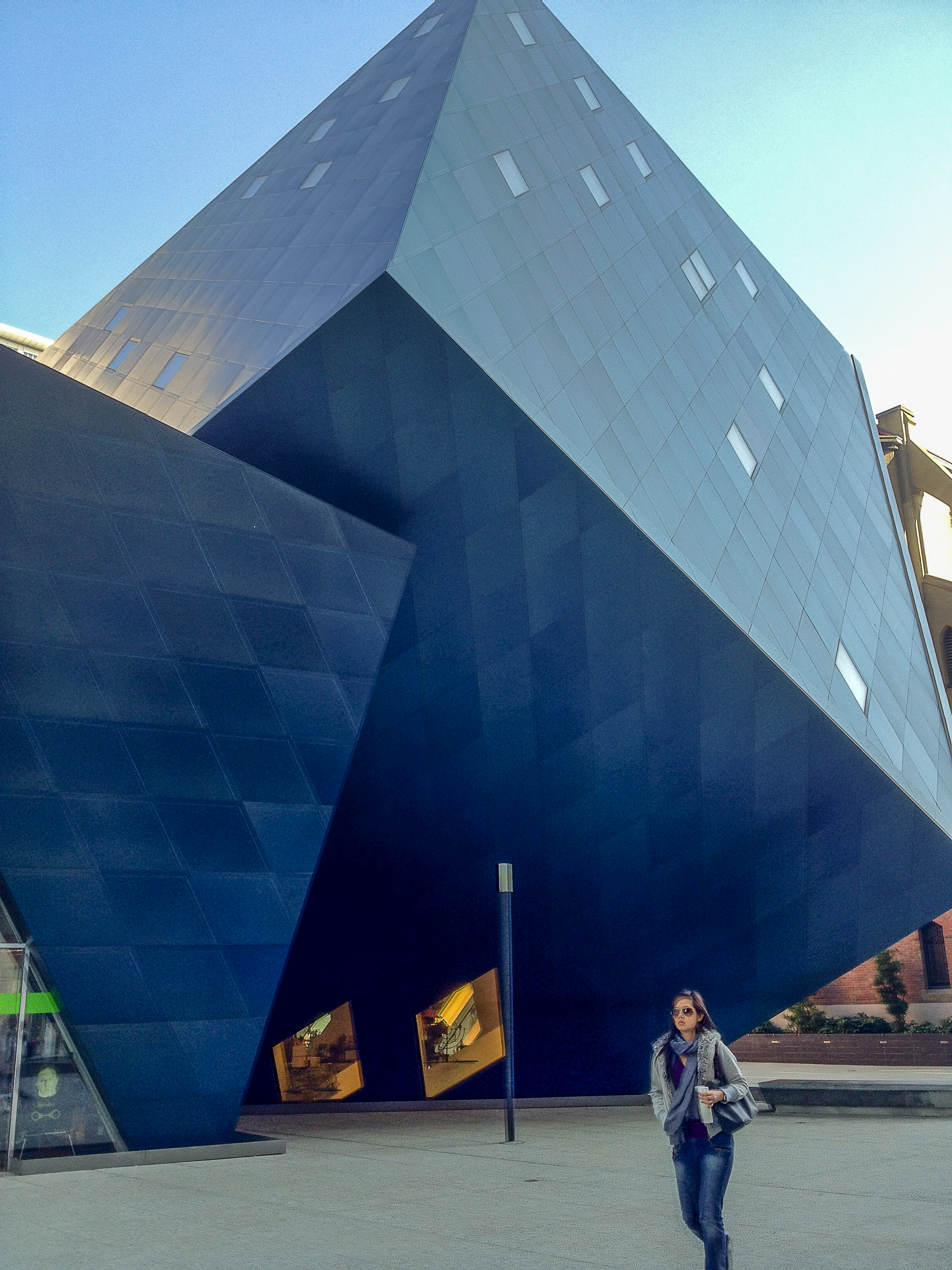
Contemporary Jewish Museum, San Francisco, California, US

PWC tower, CityLife, Milan, Italy

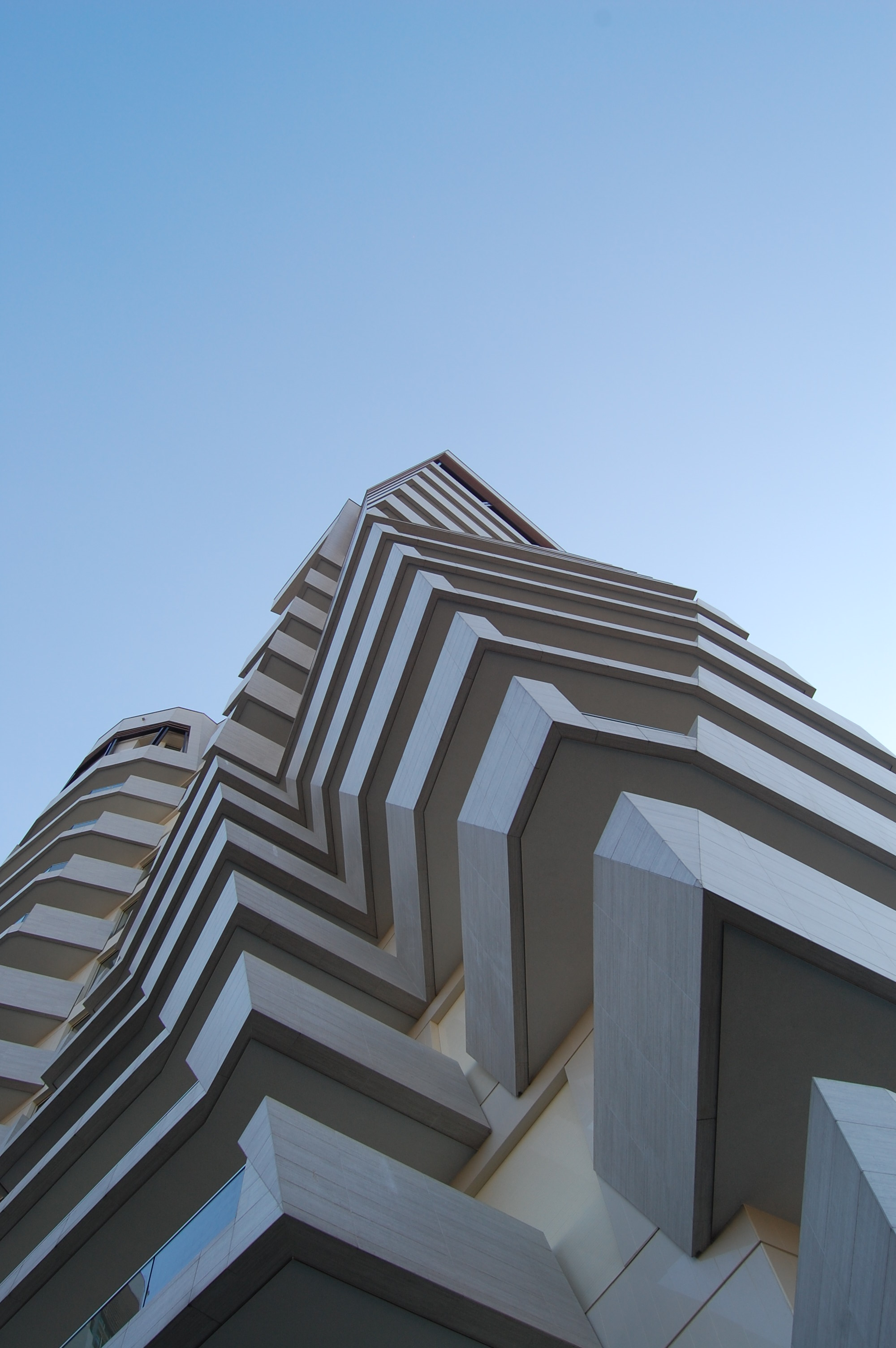
CityLife Residences, Milan, Italy

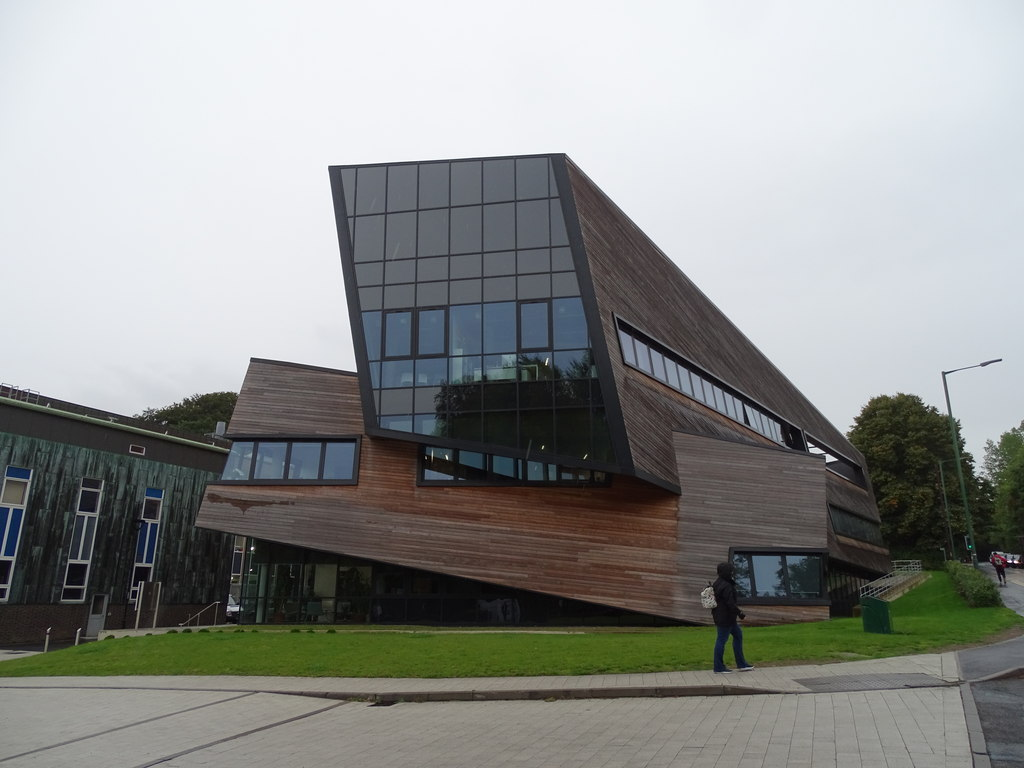
Ogden Centre for Fundamental Physics at Durham University, Durham, England

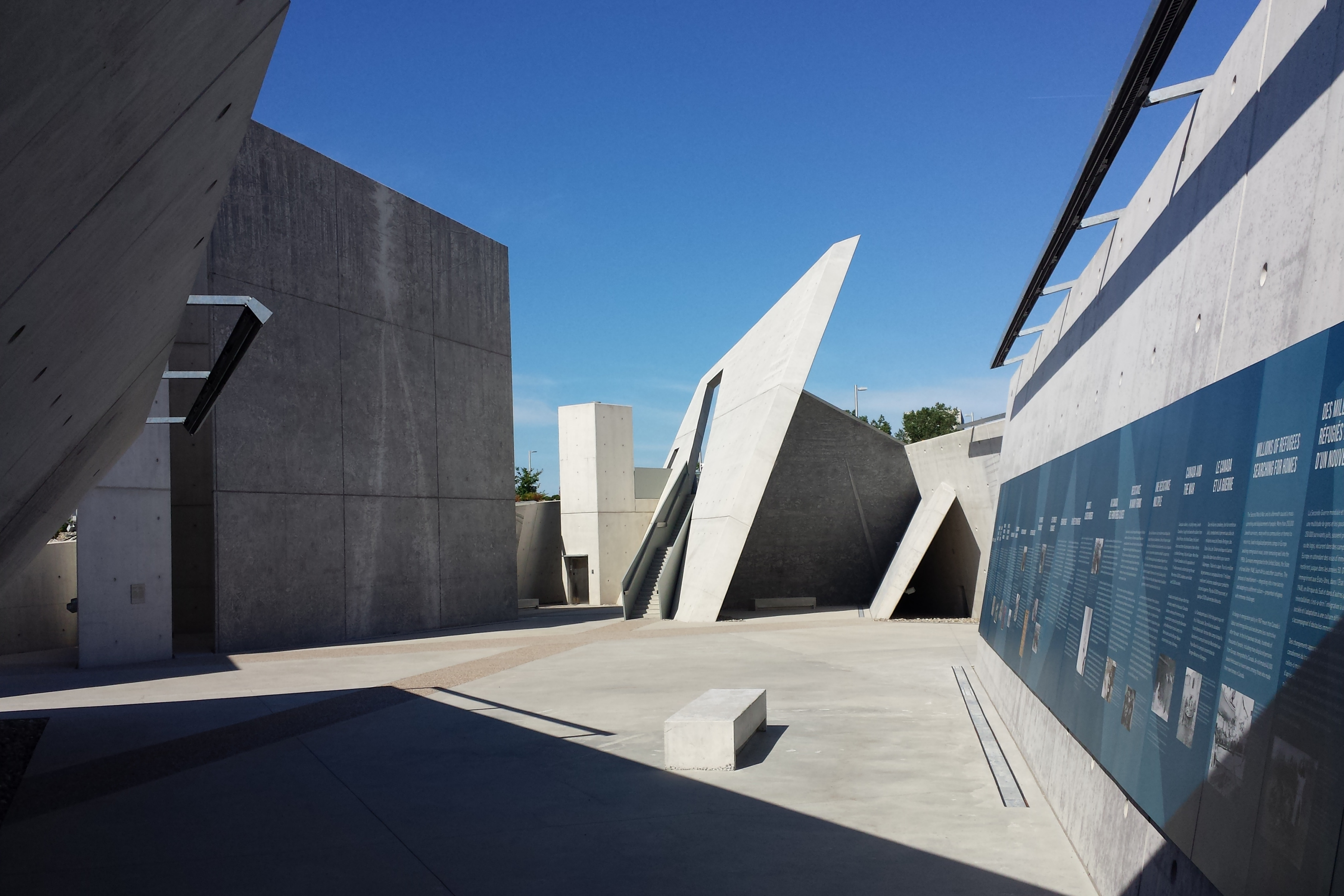
National Holocaust Monument, Ottawa, Canada

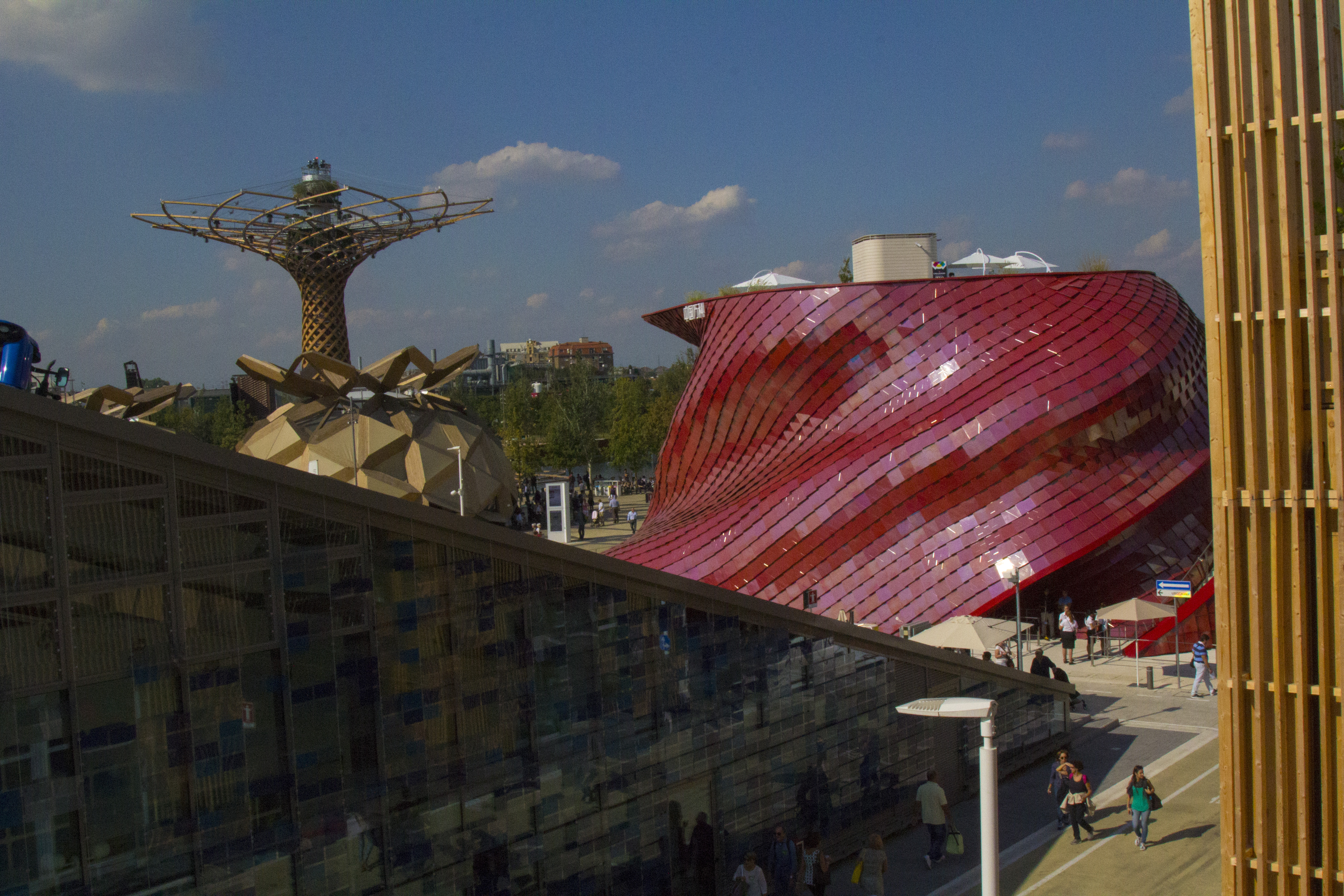
Vanke Pavilion, Expo 2015, Milan, Italy

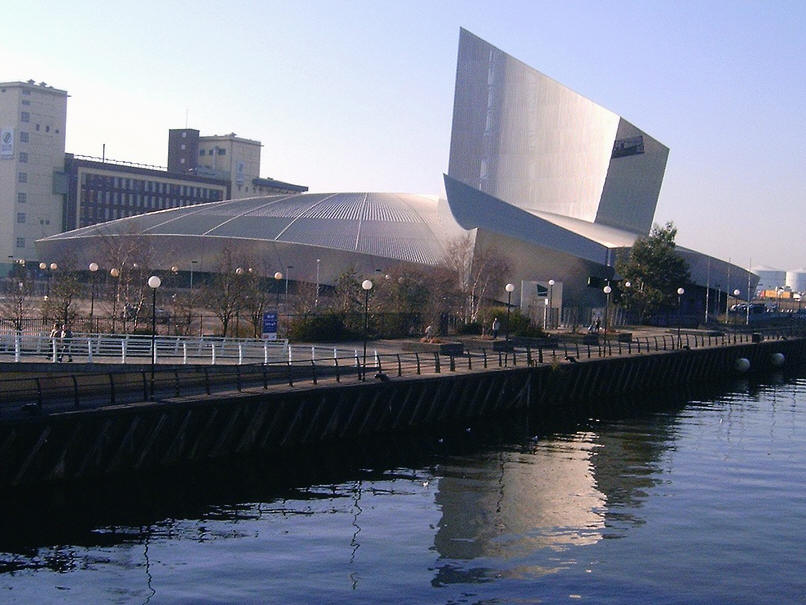
Imperial War Museum North, Trafford, Manchester, England

The following projects are listed on the Studio Libeskind website. The first date is the competition, commission, or first presentation date. The second is the completion date or the estimated date of completion.

=== Completed ===
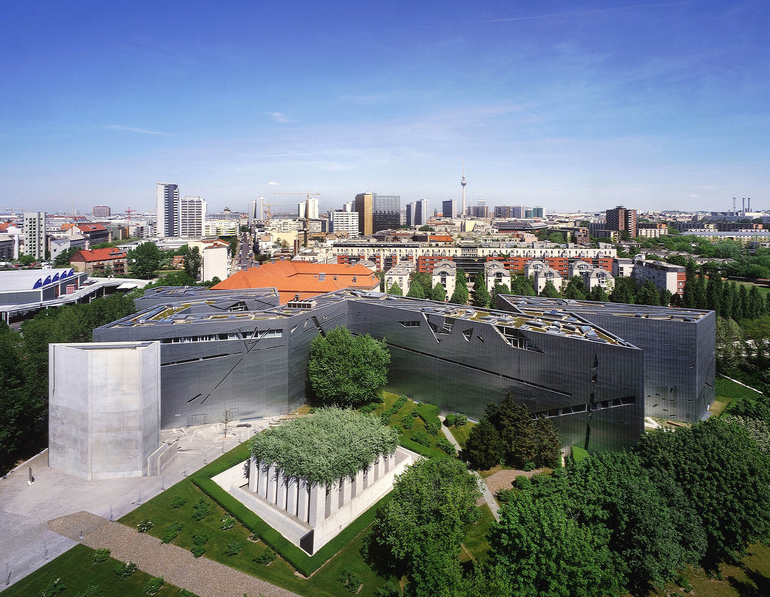
Jewish Museum Berlin (1999)

- 1989–2001 Jewish Museum Berlin – Berlin, Germany
- 1995–1998 Felix Nussbaum Haus – Osnabrück, Germany
- 1997–2001 Imperial War Museum North – Greater Manchester, England, United Kingdom
- 1998–2008 Contemporary Jewish Museum – San Francisco, California, United States
- 2000–2003 Studio Weil – Mallorca, Spain
- 2000–2006 Extension to the Denver Art Museum, Frederic C. Hamilton Building – Denver, Colorado, United States
- 2000–2006 Denver Art Museum Residences – Denver, Colorado, United States
- 2000–2008 Westside Shopping and Leisure Centre – Bern, Switzerland
- 2001–2003 Danish Jewish Museum – Copenhagen, Denmark
- 2001–2004 London Metropolitan University Graduate Centre – London, England, United Kingdom
- 2001–2005 The Wohl Centre – Bar-Ilan University, Ramat Gan, Israel
- 2002–2007 Michael Lee-Chin Crystal, extension to Royal Ontario Museum and renovation of ten of its existing galleries – Toronto, Ontario, Canada
- 2003–2005 Tangent, Facade for Hyundai Development Corporation Headquarters – Seoul, South Korea
- 2004–2005 Memoria e Luce, 9/11 Memorial – Padua, Italy
- 2004–2007 Glass Courtyard addition to the Jewish Museum Berlin – Berlin, Germany
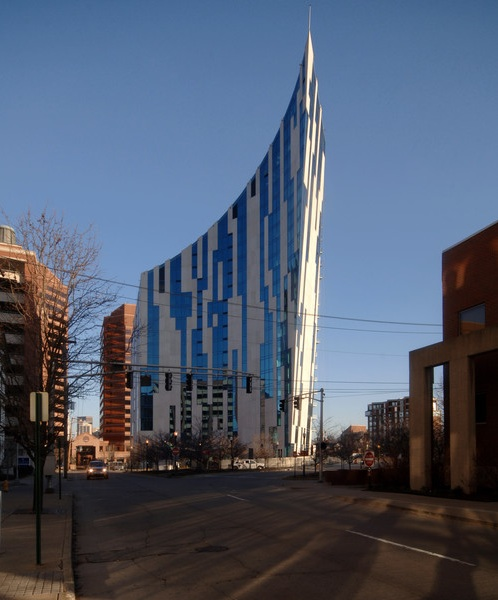
- The Ascent at Roebling's Bridge (2008) Covington, Kentucky
  2004–2008 The Ascent at Roebling's Bridge, residential condominium building – Covington, Kentucky, United States
- 2005–2009 MGM Mirage's CityCenter, retail and public space on the Las Vegas Strip – Paradise, Nevada
- 2004–2010 Grand Canal Square, Grand Canal Theatre and Commercial Development – Dublin, Ireland
- 2010 Wheel of Conscience monument, M.S. St. Louis Memorial, Pier 21 – Halifax, Canada
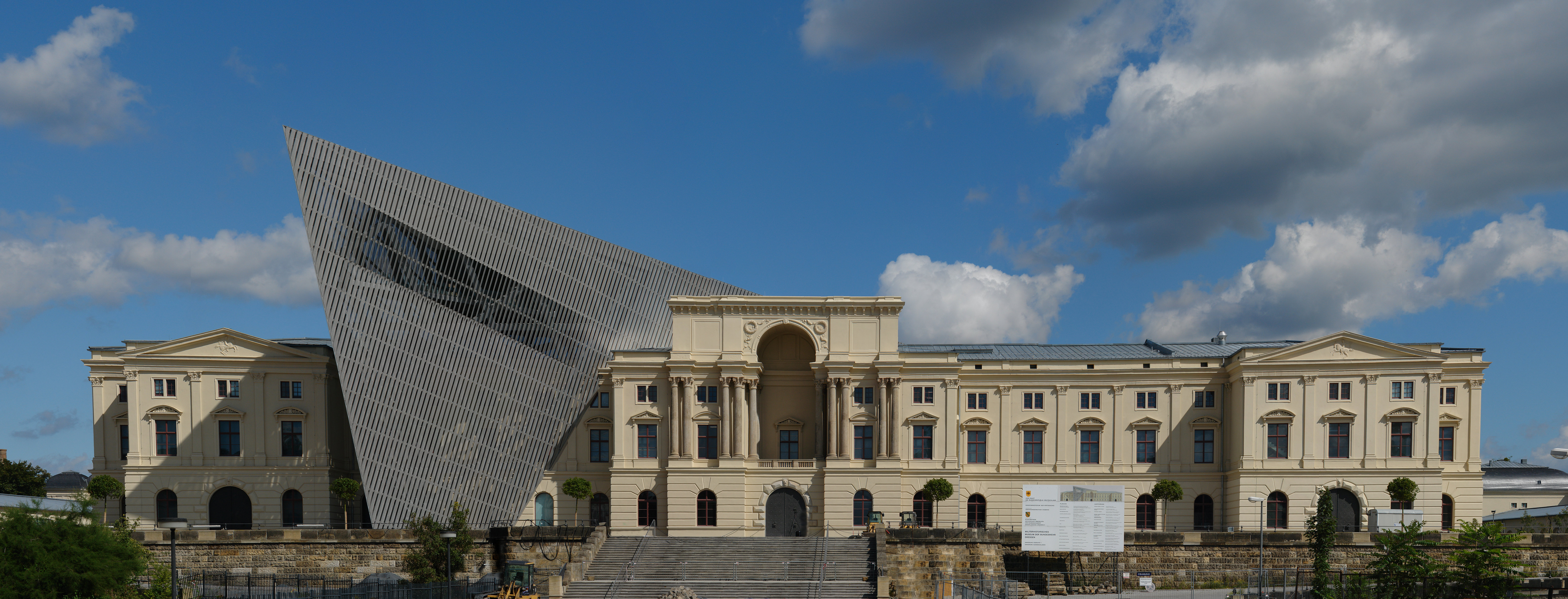
- Military History Museum (2010), Dresden
  2001–2011 Military History Museum – Dresden, Germany
- 2002–2011 Run Run Shaw Creative Media Centre at the City University of Hong Kong – Hong Kong
- 2006–2011 Reflections at Keppel Bay, high-rise and low-rise villa apartment blocks – Keppel Bay, Singapore
- 2007–2008 18.36.54 private residence – Connecticut, United States
- 2007–2011 Haeundae I Park Marina, skyscraper complex – Busan, South Korea
- 2009 Libeskind Villa – prefab smart house – Rheinzink GmbH & Co. KG Global Headquarters, Datteln, Germany
- 2010–2012 Jewish Museum Berlin Academy in the Eric F. Ross Building, academy – Berlin, Germany
- 2009–2013 Kö-Bogen, Königsallee, Düsseldorf, Germany
- 2012–2015 Mons International Congress XPerience, Mons, Belgium
- 2013–2014 Ohio Holocaust & Liberators Memorial, Columbus, Ohio
- 2014–2015 Life Electric, sculpture – Como, Italy
- 2015 Vanke Pavilion, sculpture – Milan, Italy
- 2015 Future Flowers, sculpture – Milan, Italy
- 2015 Milan Expo Gates, sculpture – Milan, Italy
- 2010–2015 Vitra Tower – Sao Paulo, Brazil
- 2013–2016 Lotte Mart – Songdo, South Korea
- 2005–2016 L Tower and Sony Centre for the Performing Arts Redevelopment – Toronto, Canada
- 2013–2016 Corals at Keppel Bay, Singapore
- 2012–2016 Sapphire, – Berlin, Germany
- 2007–2017 Złota 44, residential tower – Warsaw, Poland
- 2011–2017 Main building and auditorium, Leuphana University of Lüneburg – Lüneburg, Germany
- 2015–2017 Odgen Centre for Fundamental Physics at Durham University, Durham, England
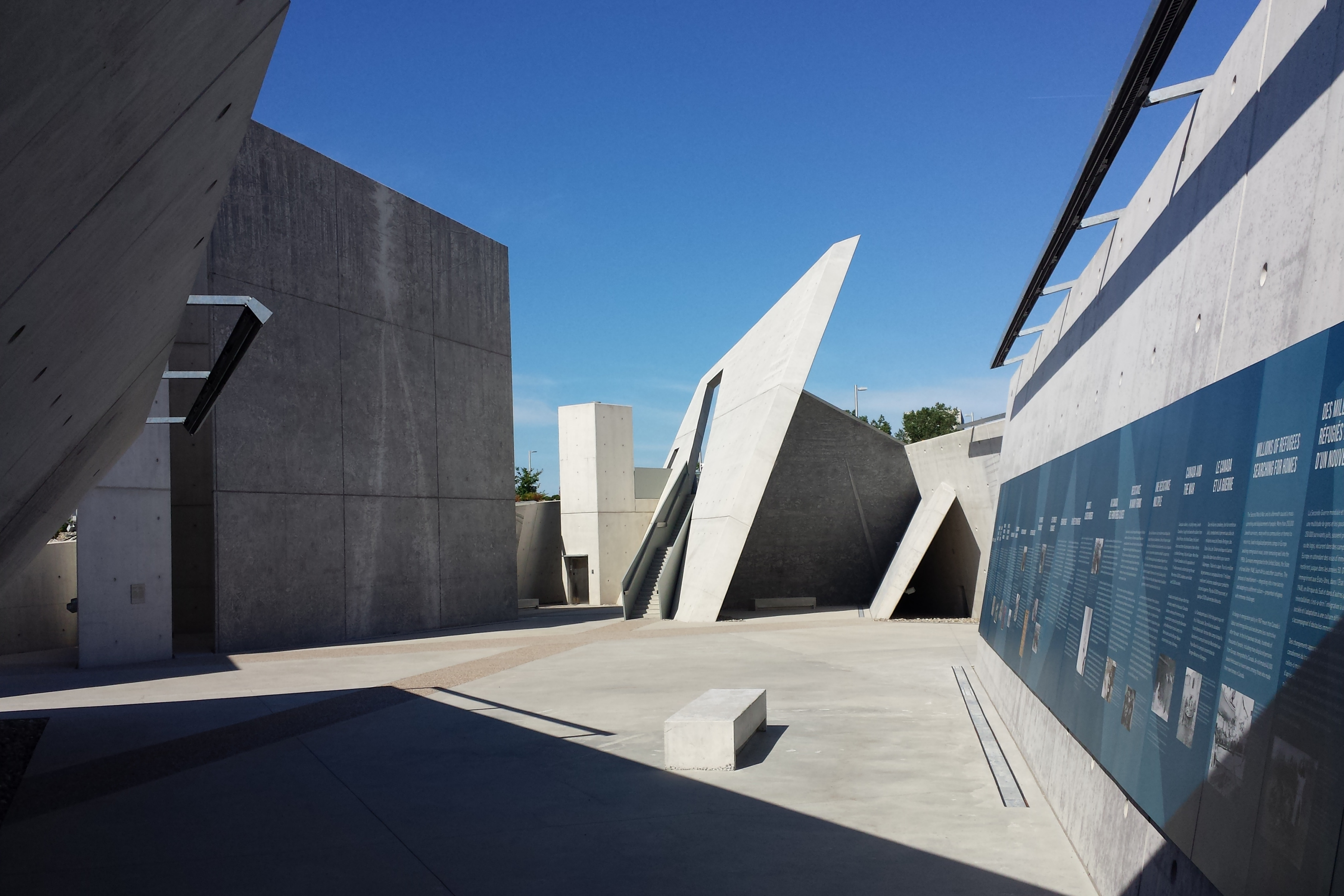
- National Holocaust Monument (2017), Ottawa
  2014–2017 National Holocaust Monument – Ottawa, Canada
- 2011–2018 Zhang Zhidong Museum – Wuhan, China
- 2017–2018 MO Museum – Vilnius, Lithuania
- 2013–2019 Century Spire, Manila, Philippines
- 2013–2021 National Holocaust Names Memorial, Amsterdam, the Netherlands
- 2018–2021 Tampere Deck Arena, Tampere, Finland
- 2015–2019 CityLife (Milan), Tower – Milan, Italy

=== Under construction ===
- 2002–ongoing World Trade Center master plan – New York City, New York
- 2004–2020 CityLife (Milan), masterplan – Milan, Italy
- 2012–2021 Lotte Mall Songdo & Officetel, Songdo, South Korea
- 2012–2020 Amsterdam Holocaust Memorial – Amsterdam, Netherlands
- 2017–2020 Verve, Frankfurt, Germany
- 2017–2020 East Thiers Station, Nice, France
- 2018– 2023 Atrium at Sumner – Brooklyn, New York, US
- 2019–2023 Artery – Vilnius, Lithuania
- 2003– 2023 Maggie's Centre at the Royal Free, London, UK

=== Proposed or in design ===
- 2009–? Archipelago 21, masterplan – Seoul, South Korea
- 2009–? Harmony Tower, Seoul, South Korea
- 2009–? Dancing Towers, Seoul, South Korea
- 2009–? Kurdistan Museum, Erbil, Kurdistan Region, Iraq
- 2008–? New York Tower, New York City, United States
- 2018 – Great Synagogue of Vilna restoration, Vilnius, Lithuania
- 2017–2022 Occitanie Tower, Toulouse, France
- 2019–2024 Ngaren: The Museum of Humankind – Kenya
- 2020–? Baccaratt Hotel and Residences – Dubai, UAE
- 2021–? Tree of Life Synagogue, Pittsburgh, Pennsylvania
- 2022–? Boerentoren 'crown', Antwerp, Belgium
- 2025 Museo Regional de Tarapaca, Iquique, Chile
- 2025 Fan d'Issy, Paris, France

=== Libeskind design products ===
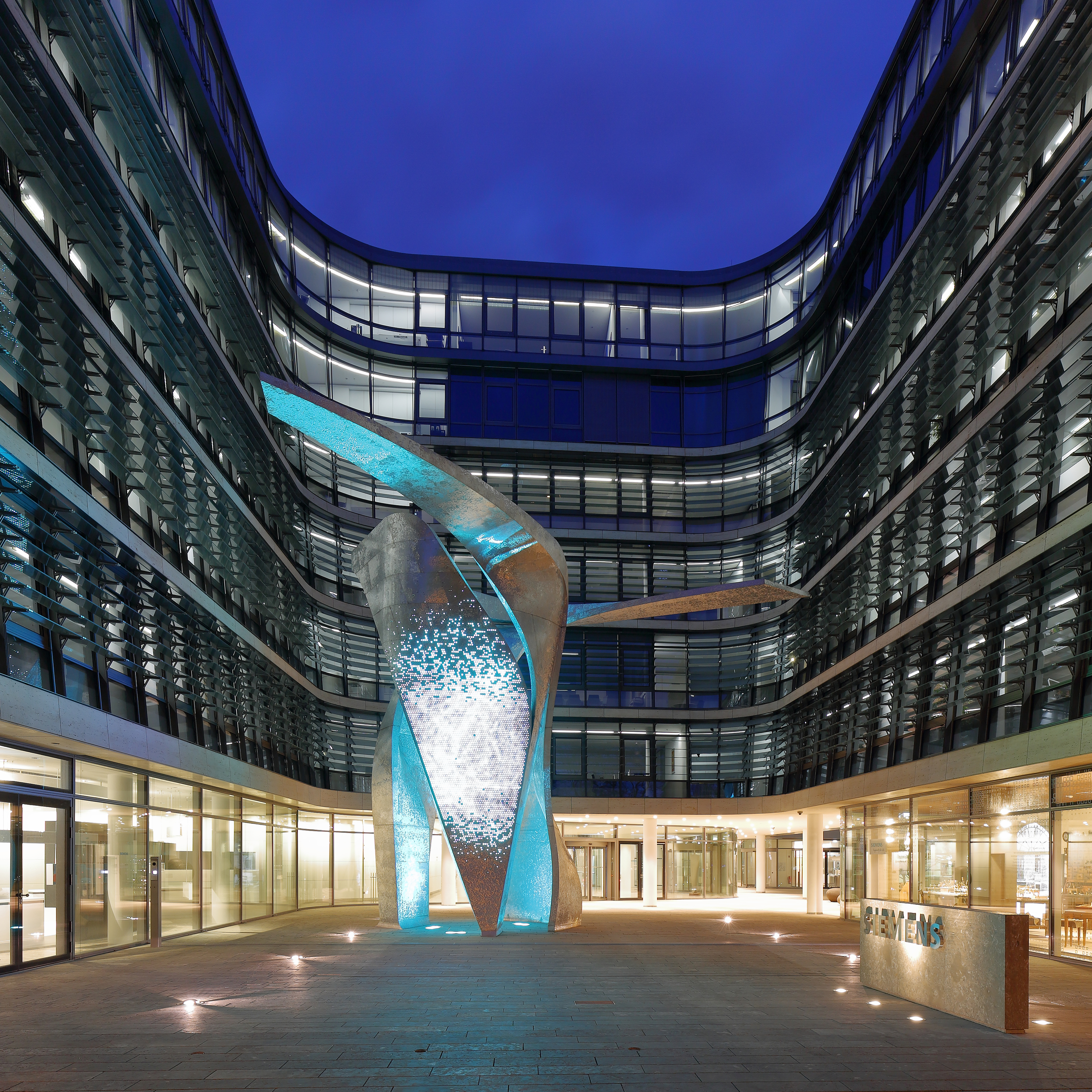
- "The Wings" – sculpture in Munich
  2007 Royal Ontario Museum Spirit House Chair, Nienkamper, Toronto, Canada
- 2009 Tea Set, Sawaya & Moroni
- 2009 Denver Door Handle, Olivari
- 2011 eL Masterpiece, Zumtobel Group, Sawaya & Moroni
- 2012 Torq Armchair and Table, Sawaya & Moroni
- 2012 Zohar Street Lamp, Zumtobel Group
- 2012 The Idea Door 1 & 2, TRE-Più
- 2013 The Wing Mirror, Fiam
- 2013 Flow, Jacuzzi
- 2013 Paragon Lamp, Artemide
- 2013 Nina Door Handle, Olivari
- 2014 Ice Glass Installation
- 2016 Water Tower, Alessi
- 2016 Gemma Collection, Moroso
- 2016 Swarovski Chess Set, Swarovski
- 2017 Cordoba light, Slamp
- 2017 Dining and side Table, Citco
- 2019 Boaz Chair, Wilde + Spieth

== Awards and recognition ==
- Praemium Imperiale in the category Architecture (2026)
- Alexander Hamilton Immigrant Achievement Award (2025)
- First architect to receive the Jan Kaplicky Lifetime Achievement Award (2023)
- First architect to receive the Dresden International Peace Prize (2023)
- First architect to win the Hiroshima Art Prize, awarded to an artist whose work promotes international understanding and peace (2001)
- In 2003, he received the Leo Baeck Medal for his humanitarian work promoting tolerance and social justice.
- AIANY Merit Award for the National Holocaust Monument, Ottawa, Canada (2018)
- MIPIM/The Architectural Review Future Project Award, for L'Occitanie Tower in Toulouse, France (2018)
- CTBUH Urban Habitat Award for the World Trade Center Master Plan (2018)
- American Institute of Architects National Service Award for the World Trade Center Master Plan (2012)
- Fellow for the American Institute of Architects (2016)
- RIBA Regional Award for Ogden Centre for Fundamental Physics at Durham University (2017)
- Received an Honorary Doctorate of Architecture from the University of South Florida.
- Doctor Honoris Causa of the New Bulgarian University in 2013 in recognition of his influence on contemporary architectural research and practice
- First recipient of honorary degree of Doctor of Fine Art from University of Ulster in recognition of his outstanding services to global architecture and design (2009)
- MIPIM award in Best Urban Regeneration Project for KoBogen (2014)
- FIABCI Prix d'Excellence Award, Residential for Reflections at Keppel Bay (2013)
- European Museum Academy Prize for the Military History Museum (2013)
- Buber-Rosenzweig-Medal (2010)
- Gold medal for Architecture at the National Arts Club (2007)
- RIBA International Award for Wohl Centre at Bar-Ilan University (2006)
- RIBA International Award for the Imperial War Museum North (2004)
- RIBA Award for the London Metropolitan University Graduate Centre (2004)
- Appointed as the first Cultural Ambassador for Architecture by the U.S. Department of State (2004)
- Honorary member of the Royal Academy of Arts in London, England (2004)
- Man of the Year Award from the Tel Aviv Museum of Art (2004)
- Goethe Medal for cultural contribution by the Goethe Institute (2000)
- Time magazine Best of 1998 Design Awards for the Felix Nussbaum Haus (1998)
- Elected to the American Academy of Arts and Letters (1996)
- Venice Biennale First Prize Stone Lion Award for Palmanova Project (1985)
- National Endowment for the Arts Design Arts Grant for Studies in Architecture (1983)
- American Institute of Architects Medal for Highest Scholastic Achievement (1970)

== Personal life ==
Libeskind met Nina Lewis, his future wife and business partner, at the Bundist-run Camp Hemshekh in upstate New York in 1966. They married a few years later and, instead of a traditional honeymoon, traveled across the US visiting Frank Lloyd Wright buildings on a Cooper Union fellowship. Nina is co-founder for Studio Daniel Libeskind. She is the daughter of the late-Canadian political leader David Lewis and the sister of former Canadian Ambassador to the United Nations, Stephen Lewis.

Libeskind has lived, among other places, in New York City, Toronto, Michigan, Italy, Germany, and Los Angeles. He is both a U.S. and Israeli citizen.

Nina and Daniel Libeskind have three children: Lev, Noam, and Rachel.

== Bibliography ==
- Daniel Libeskind: Countersign (1992) (ISBN 0-8478-1478-5)
- Daniel Libeskind Radix-Matrix (1997) (ISBN 3-7913-1727-X)
- Fishing from the Pavement (1998)
- Jewish Museum Berlin (with Helene Binet) (1999) (ISBN 90-5701-252-9)
- Daniel Libeskind: The Space of Encounter (2001) (ISBN 978-0-7893-0483-4)
- Daniel Libeskind (2001) (ISBN 0-7893-0496-1)
- Breaking Ground (2004) (ISBN 1-57322-292-5)
- Counterpoint (2008) (ISBN 1-58093-206-1)
- In the Unlikeliest of Places: How Nachman Libeskind Survived the Nazis, Gulags, and Soviet Communism (2014) Annette Libeskind Berkovits; foreword by Daniel Libeskind (ISBN 978-1-77112-066-1)
- Edge of Order (2018) (ISBN 978-0-451-49735-2)
