= List of buildings and structures in Como =

This list of buildings and structures in Como lists palaces, monuments, churches and buildings of Como.

| Image | Building | Architect | Style |
|---|---|---|---|
| | Asilo Sant'Elia | Giuseppe Terragni | rationalism |
| | Basilica di San Fedele | | Romanesque architecture |
| | Basilica of Sant'Abbondio | | Romanesque architecture |
| | basilique San Carpoforo | | Romanesque architecture |
| | Broletto | | Romanesque architecture |
| | Casa del Fascio | Giuseppe Terragni | rationalism |
| | Casa Pedraglio | Giuseppe Terragni | rationalism |
| | Castello Baradello | | Romanesque architecture |
| | Castello della Torre Rotonda | | |
| | chiesa di Sant'Agostino | | renaissance architecture Italian Baroque architecture |
| | Como Cathedral | | Gothic architecture |
| | Como Civic Art Gallery | | |
| | Conservatorio Giuseppe Verdi (Como) | | renaissance architecture |
| | Dosso Pisani | Luigi Conconi | Art Nouveau; Eclecticism in art |
| | fontana di Camerlata | Cesare Cattaneo; Mario Radice | rationalism abstract art |
| | Idroscalo Internazionale di Como | | |
| | Liceo ginnasio statale Alessandro Volta | Simone Cantoni | Italian Neoclassical architecture |
| | Life Electric | Daniel Libeskind | Deconstructivism |
| | Monumento ai caduti | Giuseppe Terragni | rationalism |
| | Monumento alla Resistenza europea | Gianni Colombo | |
| | Mura di Como | | Medieval architecture |
| | Museo archeologico Paolo Giovio | | |
| | Museo didattico della seta di Como | | |
| | Museo storico Giuseppe Garibaldi | | |
| | Novocomum | Giuseppe Terragni | rationalism |
| | Ospedale Valduce | | |
| | Palaghiaccio Casate | | |
| | Palazzo Cernezzi, casa comunale | | |
| | Pontificio Collegio Gallio | | |
| | Porta Torre | | Romanesque architecture |
| | Seminario maggiore di Como | Simone Cantoni | Italian Neoclassical architecture |
| | Stadio Giuseppe Sinigaglia | Giovanni Greppi | rationalism |
| | Teatro Cressoni | | |
| | Teatro Sociale | Giuseppe Cusi; Luigi Canonica | Italian Neoclassical architecture |
| | Tempio Voltiano | Federico Frigerio | Italian Neoclassical architecture |
| | Villa Olmo | Simone Cantoni | Italian Neoclassical architecture |
