= Le cantatrici villane =

Comic opera by Valentino Fioravanti

- Opera by Valentino Fioravanti
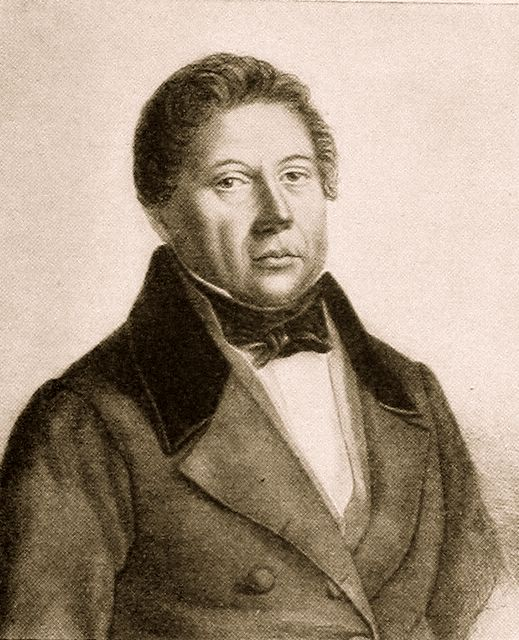
- The composer
- Translation: The Boorish Singers
- Other title: Le virtuose ridicole (revised version)
- Librettist: Giuseppe Palomba
- Language: Italian
- Premiere: 1799; Naples

Le cantatrici villane (The Boorish Singers) is a comic opera (dramma giocoso) in two acts composed by Valentino Fioravanti to a libretto by Giuseppe Palomba. It was first performed in Naples in 1799. A revised one act version premiered at the Teatro San Moisè in Venice as Le virtuose ridicole in 1801.

An opera by Antonio Cagnoni based on the same libretto and entitled Don Bucefalo premiered in Milan in 1847.

== Roles ==
- Rosa, a peasant believed to be a widow (soprano)
- Agata, a peasant (soprano)
- Giannetta, a peasant (soprano)
- Don Bucefalo, a timid and ignorant choirmaster (bass)
- Don Marco, a well-to-do student of Don Bucefalo and in love with Rosa (bass)
- Carlino, a young soldier who has disappeared in Spain and husband of Rosa (tenor)
- Giansimone, a waiter in the local inn (tenor)

== Synopsis ==
The action takes place in 18th century Casoria, a village near Naples.

Three country wenches (Agata, Giannetta and Rosa) have aspirations to become bel canto virtuose with the help of an ignorant choirmaster (Don Bucefalo) and another would-be singer (Don Marco), but things get complicated with the unexpected return of a bragging soldier and Rosa's jealous husband (Carlino).

== Discography ==
- Le cantatrici villane (1CD) – Alda Noni, Ester Orell, Fernanda Cadoni, Sesto Bruscantini, Franco Calabrese, Agostino Lazzari – Orchestra di Napoli, Mario Rossi – Cetra reissued by Warner-Fonit (1951)
- Le cantatrici villane (complete, 2 hours 15 minutes) Maria Angeles Peters, Giovanna Manci, Floriana Sovilla, Ernesto Palacio Orchestra Sinfonica del Licinio Refice, Roberto Tigani; 2000, Bongiovanni

== Sources ==
- Anderson, James (1993). The Complete Dictionary of Opera & Operetta. Wings Books. ISBN 0-517-09156-9
- Casaglia, Gherardo (2005). "Valentino Fioravanti". L'Almanacco di Gherardo Casaglia (in Italian).
- Fornasier, Umberto, Cantatrici villane, Le, in Gelli, Piero & Poletti Filippo eds. (2007). Dizionario dell'Opera 2008, Milan: Baldini Castoldi Dalai, pp. 187–188. ISBN 978-88-6073-184-5 (in Italian)
- Pessina, Marino, Don Bucefalo, in Gelli, Piero & Poletti Filippo eds. (2007), op. cit., p. 333 (in Italian)
- Polzonetti, Pierpaolo (2011). Italian Opera in the Age of the American Revolution. Cambridge University Press. ISBN 0-521-89708-4
