= Calisto Bassi =

Italian opera librettist

Calisto Bassi (beginning of the 19th century, in Cremona – c. 1860, in Abbiategrasso) was an Italian opera librettist.

Bassi wrote many original librettos and was also active as a translator into Italian of several librettos from other languages. For many years, he was also the stage director at La Scala in Milan.

== Original librettos ==
Title	Genre	Subdivisions	Music	Première	Place, theatre
Le nozze di Telemaco e Antiope	azione lirica	3 acts	Saverio Mercadante	5 November 1824	Vienna, Theater am Kärntnertor
Il podestà di Burgos ossia Il signore del villaggio	melodramma giocoso	2 acts	Saverio Mercadante	20 November 1824	Vienna, Theater am Kärntnertor
I Crociati a Tolemaide ovvero Malek-Adel	melodramma serio	2 acts	Giovanni Pacini	13 November 1828	Trieste, Teatro Grande
Il solitario	opera seria	2 acts	Giuseppe Persiani	26 April 1829	Milan, Teatro alla Scala
La vendetta	melodramma tragico	2 acts	Cesare Pugni	11 February 1832	Milan, Teatro alla Scala
Ricciarda di Edimburgo	dramma serio	2 acts	Cesare Pugni	29 September 1832	Trieste, Teatro Grande
Iacopo di Valenza	melodramma	2 acts	Ruggero Manna	Autumn 1832	Trieste, Teatro Grande
Il carrozzino da vendere	melodramma comico	1 act	Angelo Frondoni	29 June 1833	Milan, Teatro alla Scala
Amelia, ossia Otto anni di costanza	melodramma comico	3 acts	Lauro Rossi	31 December 1834	Napoli, Teatro San Carlo
I tre mariti	farsa	1 act	Giovanni Luigi Bazzoni	24 June 1836	Milan, Teatro alla Canobbiana
La bella Celeste degli Spadari	melodramma comico	2 acts	Pietro Antonio Coppola	14 June 1837	Milan, Teatro alla Canobbiana
L'ammalata e il consulto	melodramma comico	1 act	Giuseppe Manusardi	24 June 1837	Milan, Teatro alla Canobbiana
Salvator Rosa	farsa	3 acts	Giovanni Luigi Bazzoni	27 June 1837	Milan, Teatro alla Canobbiana
I ciarlatani	melodramma buffo	2 acts	Giacomo Panizza	29 October 1839	Milan, Teatro alla Scala
Il solitario	opera seria	2 acts	Achille Peri	29 May 1841	Reggio Emilia, Teatro Comunale
Il Buontempone di Porta Ticinese in Milano, ossia Sabato Domenica e Lunedì	melodramma buffo	3 acts	Placido Mandanici	16 June 1841	Milan, Teatro alla Scala
Il birichino di Parigi	melodramma	1 act	Giuseppe Manusardi	25 June 1841	Milan, Teatro alla Scala
Rosalia di San Miniato	melodramma semiserio	1 act	Antonio Cagnoni	28 February 1845	Milan, Conservatory
Azema di Granata, ovvero Gli Abencerragi ed i Zegrini	melodramma tragico	2 acts	Lauro Rossi	21 March 1846	Milan, Teatro alla Scala
Don Bucefalo	melodramma giocoso	3 acts	Antonio Cagnoni	28 June 1847	Milan, Conservatory
Il testamento di Figaro	melodramma comico	3 acts	Antonio Cagnoni	26 February 1848	Milan, Teatro Re
Mezz'ora all'Inferno	cantata fantastica		Luigi Pirola	1850	Milan, Teatro Carcano
Due mogli in una	melodramma giocoso	2 acts	Cesare Dominiceti	30 June 1853	Milan, Teatro Filodrammatici
Ida di Danimarca (Revision of La fidanzata di Lammermoor, after Scott's The Bride of Lammermoor)	opera	3 acts	Luigi Rieschi	29 July 1854	Milan, Teatro Carcano
Elodia di San Mauro	melodramma	3 acts	Giovanni Battista Meiners	Spring 1855	Milan, Teatro Carcano

== Translations ==
This is a partial list of librettos translated into Italian by Bassi. Location and date refer to the first performance of the translated version.

- L'assedio di Corinto (from Le siège de Corinthe), music by Gioachino Rossini (Parma, Teatro Ducale, 31 January 1828)
- Guglielmo Tell (from Guillaume Tell), music by Gioachino Rossini (Lucca, Teatro del Giglio, 17 September 1831)
- La muta di Portici (from La muette de Portici), music by Daniel Auber (Rome, Teatro Valle, Spring 1835)
- Roberto il Diavolo (from Robert le diable), music by Giacomo Meyerbeer (Lisbon, 2 September 1838)
- Il Postiglione di Longjumeau (from Le postillon de Lonjumeau for Adolphe Adam)
  - music by Pietro Antonio Coppola (Milan, Teatro alla Scala, 6 November 1838)
  - music by A. A. Speranza (Turin, Teatro Sutera, Spring 1845)
- La figlia del reggimento (from La fille du régiment), music by Gaetano Donizetti (Milan, Teatro alla Scala, 30 October 1840)
- La Favorita (from La favorite), music by Gaetano Donizetti (Milan, Teatro alla Scala, 6 August 1843)
- I Martiri (from Les martyrs, adaptation of Poliuto), music by Gaetano Donizetti (Lisbon, 15 February 1843)
- Roberto Bruce (from Robert Bruce), music by Gioachino Rossini (1847)
- L'anima in pena (from L'âme en peine), music by Friedrich von Flotow (1847)
- Mosè (from Moïse et Pharaon), music by Gioachino Rossini (Naples, Teatro San Carlo, 1849)
- Gerusalemme (from Jérusalem), music by Giuseppe Verdi (Milan, Teatro alla Scala, 26 December 1850)
- I Guelfi ed i Ghibellini (from Les Huguenots) (Trieste, Teatro Grande, Carnival 1851)
- Il Profeta (from Le prophète), music by Giacomo Meyerbeer (Florence, Teatro della Pergola, 26 December 1852)
- Alessandro Stradella, music by Friedrich von Flotow (Genua, Teatro Carlo Felice, Autumn 1863)

== Sources ==
- "Bassi, Calisto". Dizionario Biografico degli Italiani (in Italian). Vol. 7. Istituto dell'Enciclopedia Italiana. 1970.
- Casaglia, Gherardo (2005). "Performances by Calisto Bassi". L'Almanacco di Gherardo Casaglia (in Italian).
