= List of operas by Friedrich von Flotow =

This is a list of operas by Friedrich von Flotow (1812–1883).

== List ==
Title	Genre	Subdivisions	Libretto	Première date	Place, theatre
Pierre et Catherine		2 acts	Henri Vernoy de Saint-Georges	1835, in German, as Peter und Kathinka	Ludwigslust
Die Bergknappen		2 acts	Theodor Körner	Composed ca. 1833, but unperformed	
Alfred der Große		2 acts	Theodor Körner	Composed ca. 1833-1835, but unperformed	
Rob-Roy (or Rob le Barbe)	opéra comique	1 act	Paul Duport and Pierre Jean Baptiste Choudard Desforges, after Walter Scott	September 1836	Royaumont Abbey
Sérafine	opéra comique	2 acts	Desforges, after Frédéric Soulier	30 October 1836	Royaumont
Alice	opéra comique	2 acts	Comte Honoré de Sussy and Darnay de Laperrière	8 April 1837	Paris, Hôtel Castellane
La lettre du préfet; revised 1868	opéra comique	1 act	Edouard Bergounioux	1837	Paris, Salon Gressier
Le comte de Saint-Mégrin; rev. 1840 as Le duc de Guise	opéra	3 acts	François de la Bouillerie and Charles de la Bouillerie, after Alexandre Dumas, père's Henri III et sa cour	10 June 1838	Royaumont
Lady Melvil	opéra comique	3 acts	Jules-Henri Vernoy de Saint-Georges and Adolphe de Leuven	15 November 1838	Paris, Théâtre de la Renaissance
L'âme en peine (perhaps originally performed as L'âme jalouse?)	opéra	2 acts	Jules-Henri Vernoy de Saint Georges	29 June 1846	Paris, Opéra
L'eau merveilleuse	opéra bouffe	2 acts	Thomas-Marie-François Sauvage	30 January 1839	Paris, Théâtre de la Renaissance
Le naufrage de la Méduse	opéra	2 acts	Hippolyte Cogniard and Théodore Cogniard	31 May 1839	Paris, Théâtre de la Renaissance
Les pages de Louis XI	vaudeville		Théodore Barrière and Ferdinand de Villeneuve	6 February 1840	Paris, Théâtre de la Renaissance
L'esclave de Carmoëns (revised in 1852 as Indra, das Schlangenmädchen; revised twice in 1878, first as Zora l'enchanteresse and later the same year as Alma l'incantatrice)	opéra comique	1 act; revised version (1852): 3 scenes; revised version (1878)/II: 4 acts	Jules-Henri Vernoy de Saint-Georges; revised version (1852): Gustav zu Putlitz; revised version (1878)/I: Vernoy de Saint-George; revised version (1878)/II: Achille de Lauzières-Thémines	1 December 1843; revised version (1852); revised version (1878)/I; revised version (1878)/II	Paris, Opéra-Comique (1843); Vienna, Kärntnertortheater (1852); Paris (1878)/1; Paris, Théâtre-Italien (1878)/II
Alessandro Stradella	romantische Oper	3 acts	Friedrich Wilhelm Riese	30 December 1844	Hamburg, Stadttheater
Martha, oder Der Markt Zu Richmond	romantisch-komische Oper	4 acts	Friedrich Wilhelm Riese	25 November 1847	Vienna, Kärntnertortheater
Sophie Katharina, oder Die Großfürstin	romantisch-komische Oper	4 acts	Charlotte Bich-Pfeiffer	19 November 1850	Berlin, Königliche Oper
Rübezahl	romantische Oper	3 acts	Gustav zu Putlitz	13 August 1852	Retzien near Perleberg
Albin, oder Der Pflegesohn		3 acts	Hermann Salomon Mosenthal, after Vaudeville, Les deux Savoyards	12 February 1856	Vienna, Kärntnertortheater
Herzog Johann Albrecht von Mecklenburg, oder Andreas Mylius		3 acts	Eduard Hobein	26 May 1857	Schwerin
Pianella	komische Oper	1 act	Emil Pohl, after Pergolesi, La serva padrona	27 December 1857	Schwerin
La veuve Grapin (revised in 1861 as: Madame Bonjour)	opéra comique	1 act	Philippe-Auguste Pittaud de Forges	21 September 1859	Paris, Théâtre des Bouffes Parisiens; second version: 1 June 1861, Vienna, Theater am Franz-Joseph-Kai
Naida (Le vannier)		3 acts	Jules-Henri Vernoy de Saint Georges and Léon Halévy	11 December 1865	St Petersburg
Zilda, ou La nuit des dupes	opéra comique	2 acts	Jules-Henri Vernoy de Saint-Georges and Henri Charles Chivot	28 May 1866	Paris, Opéra-Comique
Der Königsschuß			Theodor Schloepke	22 May 1864	Schwerin
La châtelaine		2 acts	M.-A. Grandjean	September 1865	Vienna, Carltheater
Am Runenstein		2 acts	Richard Genée	13 April 1868	Prague, Ständetheater
Die Musikanten	komische Oper	3 acts	Richard Genée	19 June 1887	Mannheim, Nationaltheater
L'ombre	opéra comique	3 acts	Jules-Henri Vernoy de Saint-Georges and Adolphe Charles de Leuven	7 July 1870	Paris, Opéra Comique
La fleur de Harlem, revised as Il fiore d'Arlem		3 acts	Jules-Henri Vernoy de Saint-Georges and Adolphe Charles de Leuven, after Alexandre Dumas, père's La tulipe noire	1876	Turin
Rosellana		3 acts	Achille de Lauzières-Thémines	18 November 1876	Turin, Vittorio Emanuele
Sakuntala		3 acts	Carlo d'Orneville, after Wolzogen's adaptation of the Abhijñānaśākuntalam by Kālidāsa	incomplete	
