= Demidoff Chapel of San Donato =

Church in Florence, Italy

Coordinates: 43°47′17.98″N 11°13′31.86″E

Cappella Demidoff
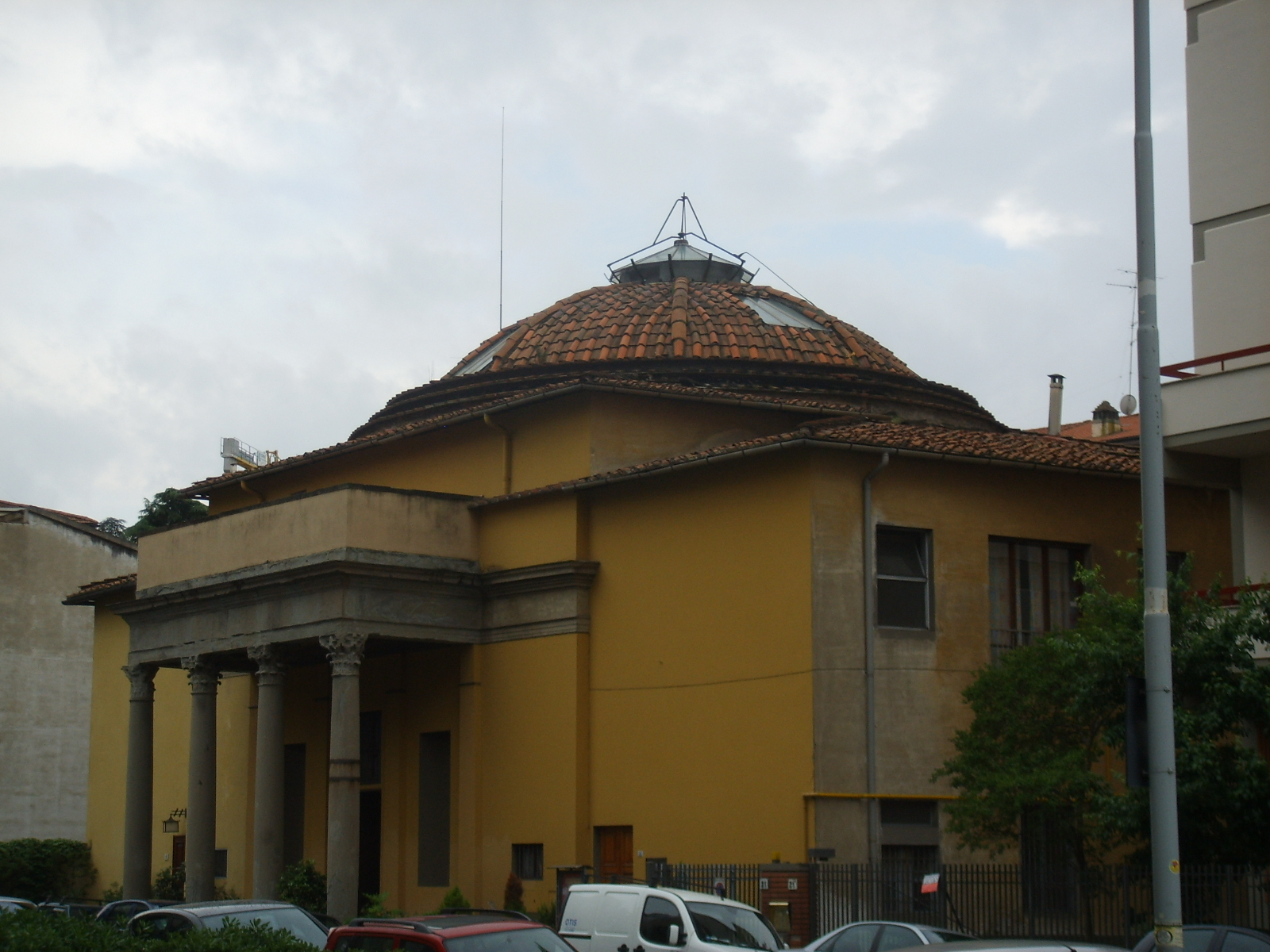

Religion
- Affiliation: Church of Christ
- Province: Florence

Location
- Location: Florence, Italy
- Interactive map of Cappella Demidoff

Architecture
- Type: Church
- Style: Neoclassicism
- Groundbreaking: 1822
- Completed: 1831

The Cappella Demidoff di San Donato, or Demidoff Chapel of San Donato, is occupied at present by the Church of Christ in Florence, and is found on via San Donato. The church was formerly the private chapel of the Villa San Donato, built by the rich Russian noble, Anatoly Nikolaievich Demidov, 1st Prince of San Donato. It belonged to the Russian Orthodox Church. The chapel recalls both the Pantheon in Rome, with its central oculus, and the Villa Capra "La Rotonda" in Vicenza by Andrea Palladio. The entrance has a classical portico. The building is in a dilapidated state.

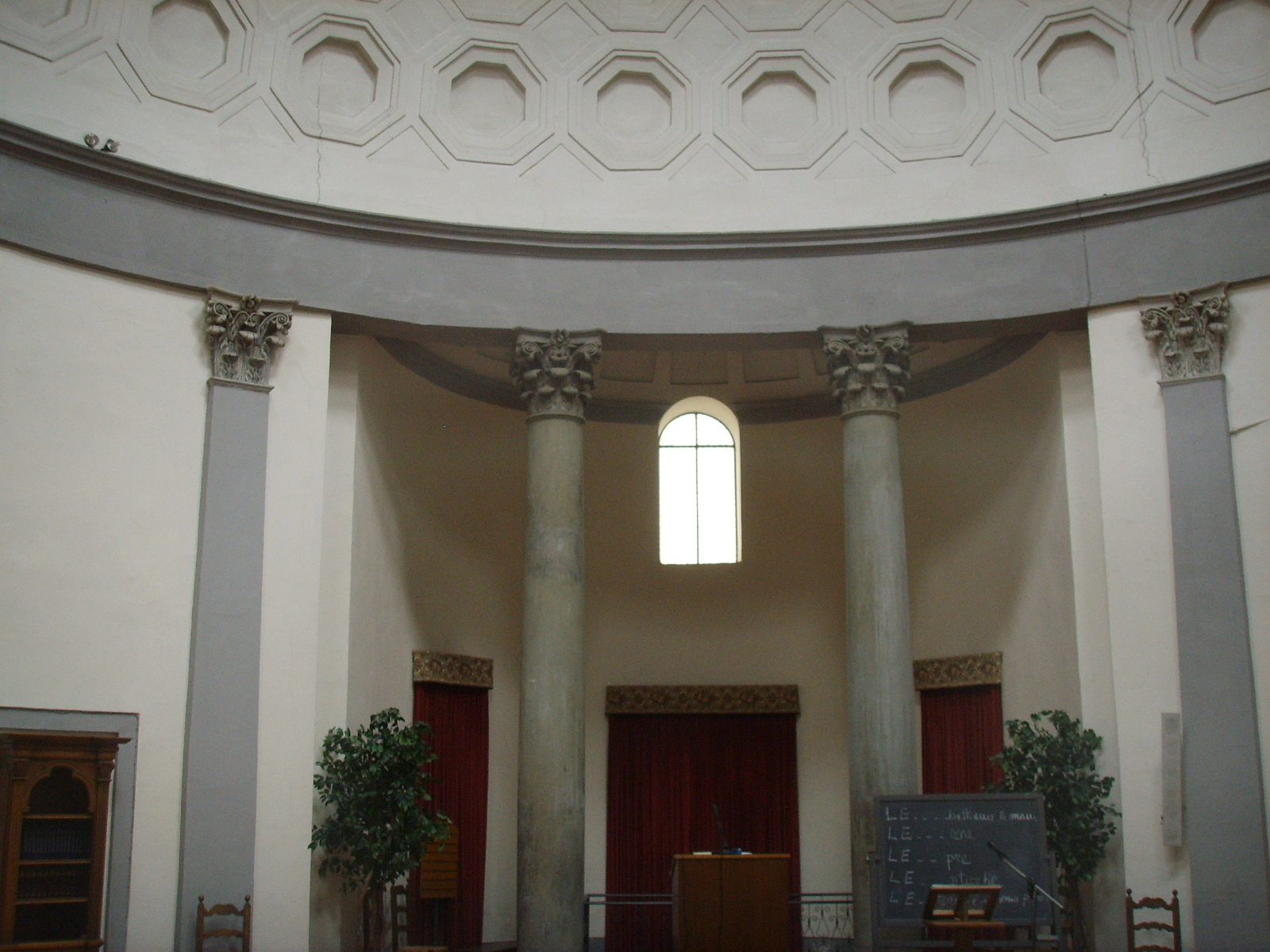
Interior

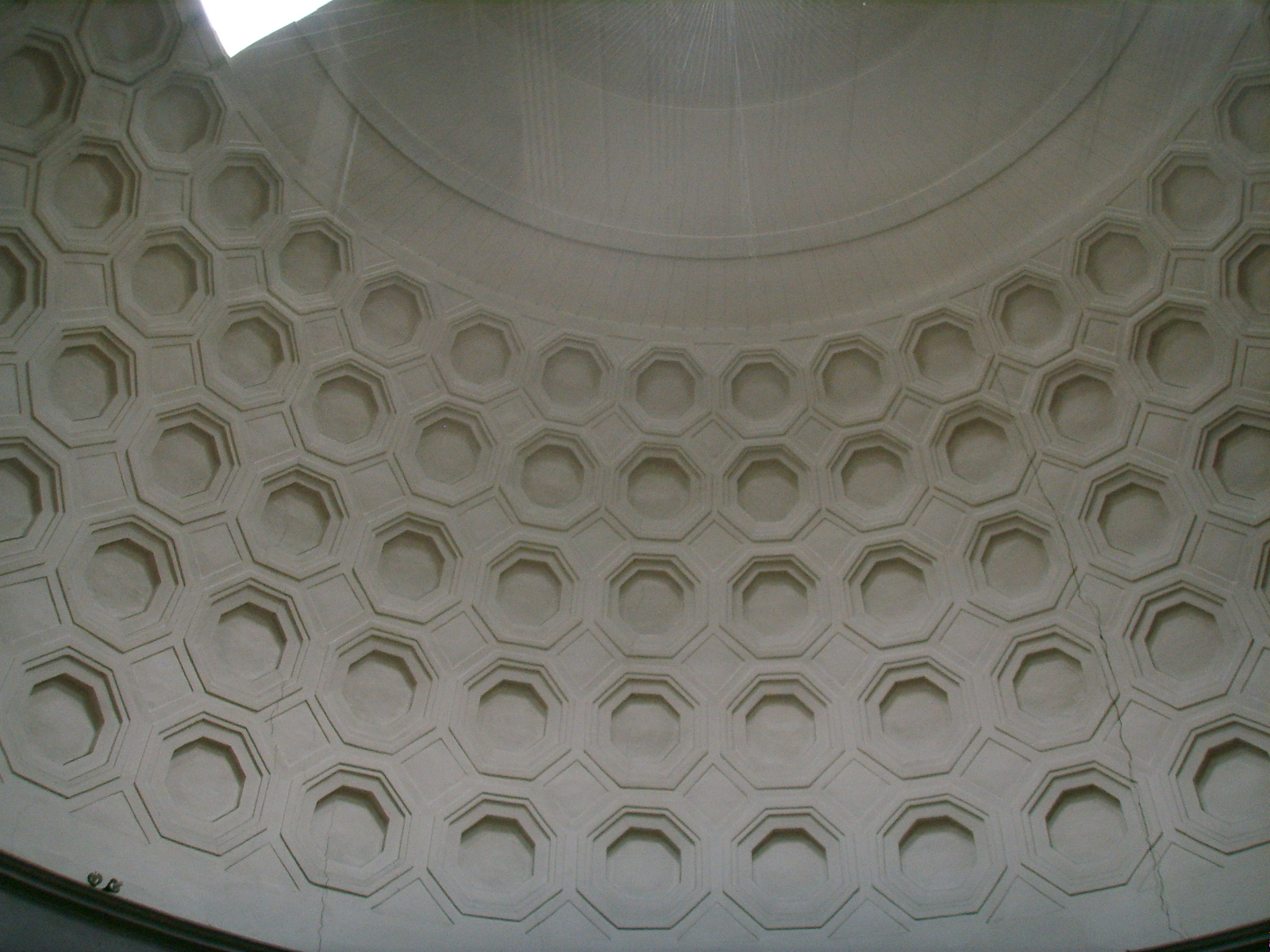
cupola

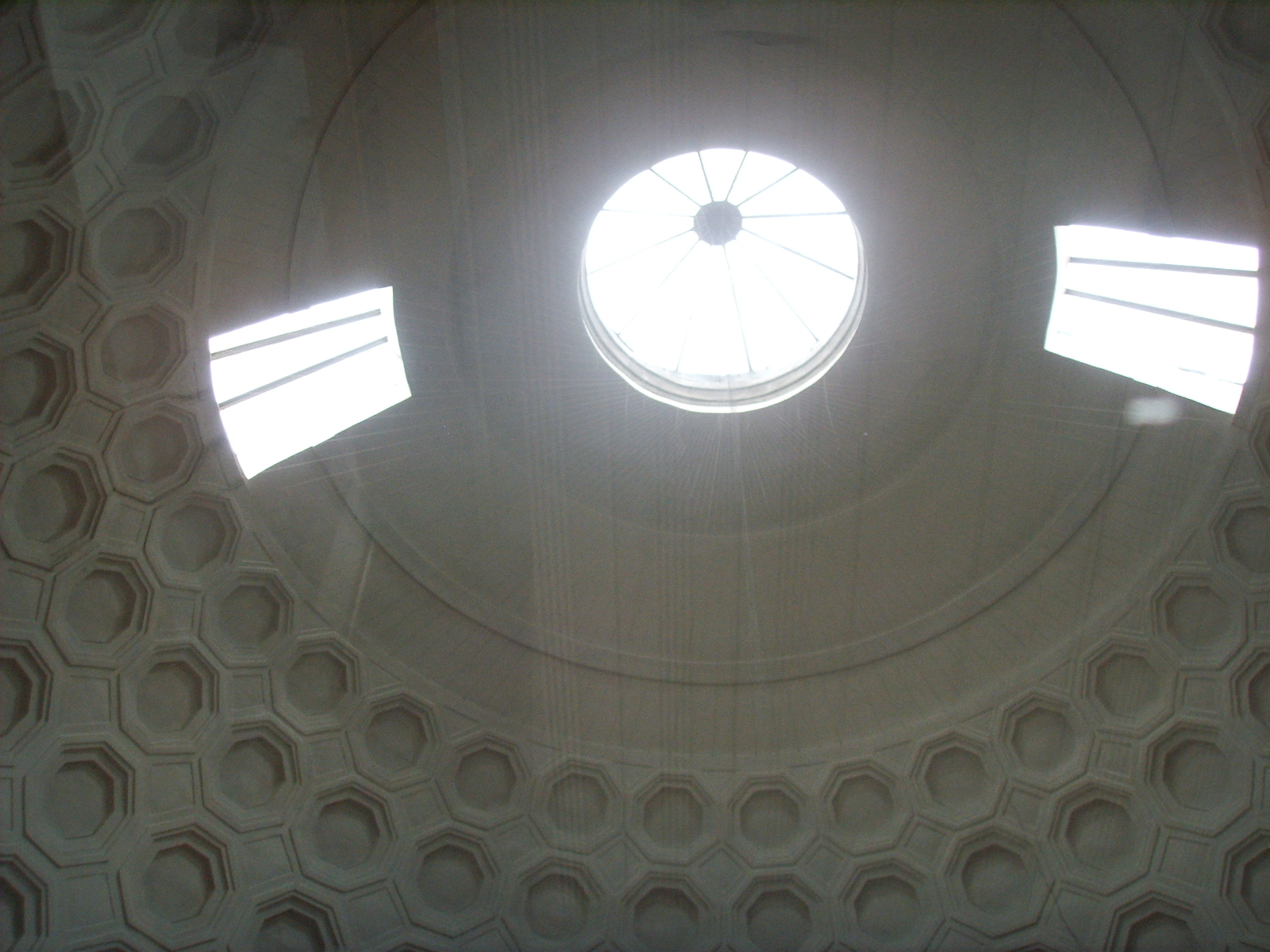
cupola

== Sources ==
- Piero Bargellini, Ennio Guarnieri, Le strade di Firenze, 4 voll., Firenze, Bonechi, 1977-1978.
- Francesco Cesati, La grande guida delle strade di Firenze, Newton Compton Editori, Roma 2003.
