= Don Bucefalo =

- Opera by Antonio Cagnoni
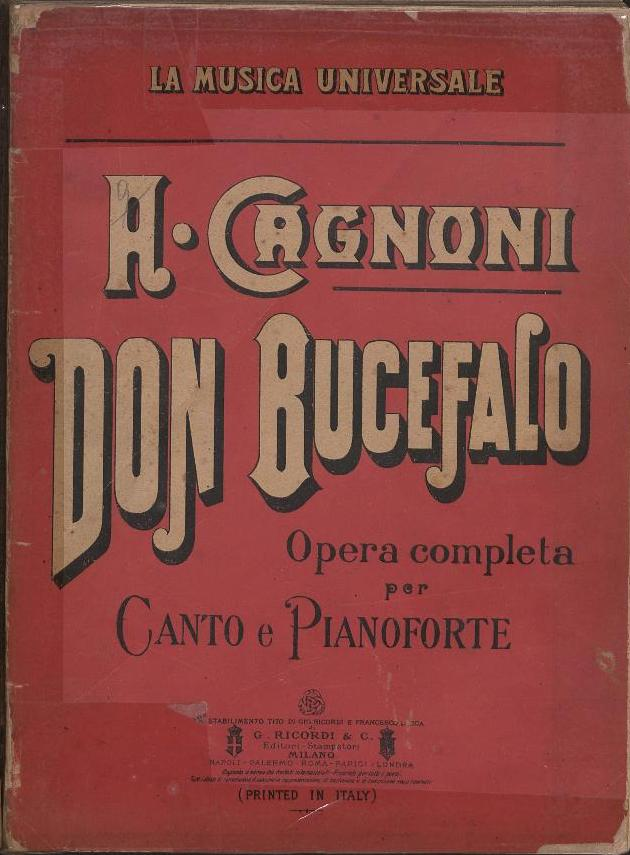
- Cover of the piano–vocal score published by Ricordi in the 1890s
- Librettist: Calisto Bassi
- Premiere: 28 June 1847; Milan Conservatory

Don Bucefalo is an opera (dramma giocoso) in three acts composed by Antonio Cagnoni to a libretto by Calisto Bassi. Bassi's libretto was based on the libretto by Giuseppe Palomba (fl. 1765–1825) to Le cantatrici villane (1799) by Valentino Fioravanti. Don Bucefalo premiered on 28 June 1847 at the Milan Conservatory.

== Performance history ==
After the success of Don Bucefalo at the Conservatory in Milan, the opera was next performed at the Teatro Nacional de São Carlos in Lisbon (1 January and 11 February 1850), the Teatro di San Carlo in Naples (23 January 1853), the Cannobiana theatre in Milan (now the Teatro Lirico (Milan)) (7 November 1854), the Teatro Regio (Parma), 4 January 1860 and 4 February 1860, an unsuccessful reprise (28 April 1860) in Milan, Bergamo's Teatro Donizetti (previously the Riccardi di Bergamo) (25 August 1860), the Provisional Municipal Theatre (Teatro Comunale, now the Teatro Coppola) of Catania (22 January 1865), Comédie-Italienne in Paris (9 November 1865) and the Solís Theatre di Montevideo (19 June 1873). Subsequently, the opera disappeared, but in July 2008 it reappeared at the Festival della Valle d'Itria. More recently, Don Bucefalo was performed at the Wexford Festival Opera in October 2014, at the Baltic State Opera in February 2020, and by the Pacific Opera Project in November 2024.

== Roles ==
Roles, voice types, premiere cast
Role	Voice type	Premiere cast, 28 June 1847
Don Bucefalo, a singing teacher	bass	Luigi Rocco
Carlino, a soldier	tenor	Paolo Buzzi
Rosa, Carlino's wife	soprano	Costanza Rovelli
Agata, a peasant woman	mezzo-soprano	Maria Pollonio
Gianetta, a peasant woman	soprano	Elisa Jarcos
Don Marco Bomba, the elderly local squire	bass	Pietro Centemeri
Count Belprato, Rosa's lover	tenor	Antonio Sangiovanni
Peasant men and women

== Synopsis ==
=== Act 1 ===
At a cafe, Don Bucefalo, a music master, encounters some peasants who sing in praise of the harvest. He promises that his singing lessons will improve their lot. One of the peasants is Rosa, whose husband, Carlino, has apparently been killed in the war. She hopes to study singing and to become the spouse of Count Belprato. Don Marco, Rosa's neighbour, also loves her, and she and her friend, Agata, discuss Don Bucefalo and the opera which he plans to stage. A soldier (Carlino in disguise), arrives hoping to find Rosa. He hears her having a music lesson in her house with Don Bucefalo, and wonders whether she still loves him. Outside her house, the men of the village are jealous, while the women are envious.

=== Act 2 ===
Don Bucefalo's opera is on the way, though the villagers are dubious about the outcome. Bucefalo is trying, with difficulty, to write verses for Rosa and Agata to sing in the opera. Rosa, however, is delighted, but when the jealous Don Marco arrives he confronts Don Bucefalo. Suddenly, the enraged Carlino (still in disguise) appears and insults Rosa, while Don Bucefalo and Don Marco hide. When they are discovered, more accusations come forth.

=== Act 3 ===
Don Marco and Don Bucefalo have stopped quarreling. Don Marco is funding the opera and will be singing the principal bass role. Agata feels that her voice is as good as Rosa's, but Rosa gets all the attention. Count Belpranto still wishes to marry Rosa, but she is less certain than previously. The orchestra is rehearsed at considerable length by Don Bucefalo. Suddenly, Carlino appears, removing his disguise, and is reunited with Rosa. After this, there are a number of alarms and excursions, but all ends happily.

== Recording ==
- Cagnoni: Don Bucefalo – Filippo Morace (Don Bucefalo), Angelica Girardi (Rosa), Francesco Marsiglia (Il conte di Belprato), Mizuki Date (Agata); Francesca de Giorgi (Giannetta), Massimiliano Silvestri (Carlino), Graziano de Pace (Don Marco). Slovak Chamber Choir, Orchestra internazionale d'Italia, Massimiliano Caldi (conductor). Live recording from the 2008 Festival della Valle d'Itria. Label: Dynamic 634.
