= Teatro Sociale =

Teatro Sociale may refer to:

- Teatro Sociale, Como, a theatre in Como, Italy
- Teatro Sociale (Treviso), a theatre in Treviso, Italy
- Teatro Sociale (Bergamo), a theatre in Bergamo, Italy
