= Valentino Fioravanti =

Italian composer

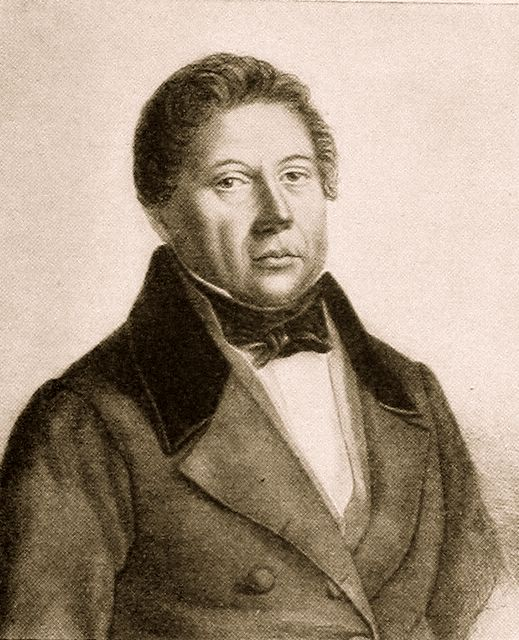
Valentino Fioravanti

Valentino Fioravanti (11 September 1764 – 16 June 1837) was an Italian composer of opera buffas.

Fioravanti was born in Rome. One of the best opera buffa composers between Domenico Cimarosa and Gioacchino Rossini, he was especially popular in Naples, and was the first in Italy to introduce spoken dialogue in the French manner in his works, sometimes using the Neapolitan dialect. His works included some 70 operas, the most famous being Le cantatrici villane from 1799. He died, aged 72, in Capua.

His eldest son, Giuseppe Fioravanti, was a successful opera singer, and his younger son, Vincenzo Fioravanti (1799–1877), also became a celebrated opera buffa composer, writing 35 stage works. His grandsons, Valentino (1827–79) and Luigi (1829–87), had successful opera careers, both as basso buffos.

== Works ==
The following appear in the extensive list of works by Fiorvanti which appear in Sadie.

- Camilla
- Il furbo contr'il furbo
- Il fabbro Parigino
- I virtuosi ambulanti
- I viaggiatori ridicoli
- Le cantatrici villane

Also:

- Il villano in angustie with libretto by Filippo Cammarano.
