= Antonio Cagnoni =

Italian composer (1828–1896)

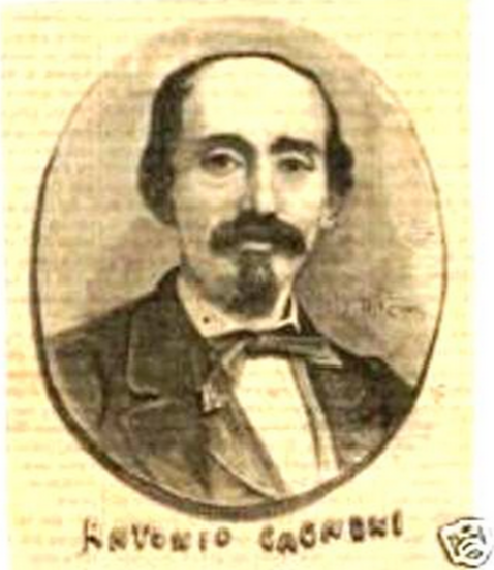
Antonio Cagnoni c. 1870s

Antonio Cagnoni (8 February 1828 – 30 April 1896) was an Italian composer. Primarily known for his twenty operas, his work is characterized by his use of leitmotifs and moderately dissonant harmonies. In addition to writing music for the stage, he composed a modest amount of sacred music, most notably a Requiem in 1888. He also contributed the third movement, Quid sum miser, to the Messa per Rossini, a collaborative work created by thirteen composers to honor Gioacchino Rossini.

== Life and career ==
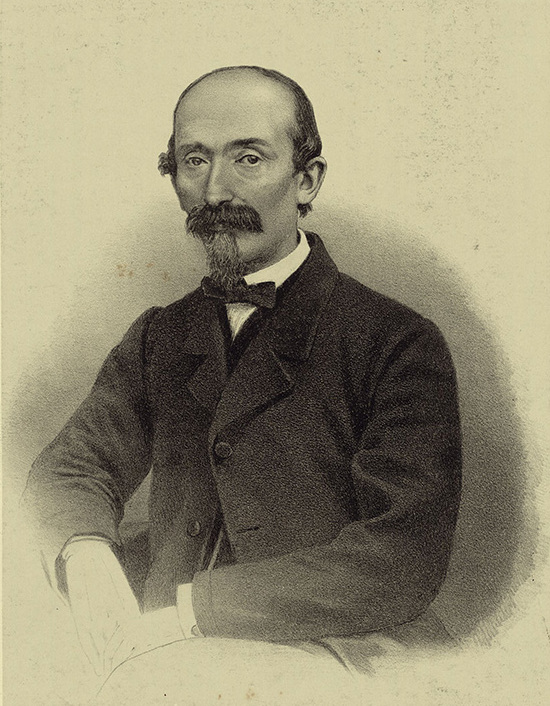
Portrait of Antonio Cagnoni, composer (1828-1896).

Antonio Cagnoni was born in Godiasco on 8 February 1828. His father, Giovanni Cagnoni, was a medical doctor, and his mother, Serafina Cagnoni (nee Nobili), was described as a "kind and cultured woman". He first studied music composition privately in Voghera with Felice Moretti; beginning his lessons before the age of 10.

In 1842 Cagnoni began his studies at the Milan Conservatory (MC). There his first three operas, Rosalia di San Miniato (1845), I due savoiardi (1846), and Don Bucefalo (1847), were premiered while he was a student. His teachers at the MC included Bernardo Ferrara (violin), Felice Frasi (composition) and Pietro Ray (composition). He completed his studies at the MC in September 1847.

Cagnoni's Don Bucefalo was particularly well received and enjoyed successful stagings at the Teatro Nacional de São Carlos (1850), Teatro di San Carlo (1853), the Teatro della Canobbiana (1854), and the Teatro Regio di Parma (1860) among others. He went on to compose 16 more operas and a pastiche, of which his most successful were Michele Perrin (1864), Claudia (1866), Un capriccio di donna (1870), Papà Martin (1871), and Francesca da Rimini (1878). His last opera, Re Lear, was completed in 1895 but did not premiere until 2009 when it was mounted at the Festival della Valle d'Itria.

In addition to his composition work, Cagnoni served as the maestro di cappella at the Vigevano Cathedral from 1856 until 1873 when he succeeded Carlo Coccia as both director of the Istituto Musicale of Novara (now the Conservatorio Guido Cantelli) and as maestro di cappella at the Novara Cathedral. In 1886 he was named a Commander of the Order of the Crown of Italy, and the same year became maestro di cappella at the Santa Maria Maggiore, Bergamo. He succeeded Amilcare Ponchielli in this latter post. He became the director of the Civico Istituto Musicale Gaetano Donizetti in Bergamo in 1888, serving in that capacity until his death, in Bergamo, eight years later.

== Operas ==
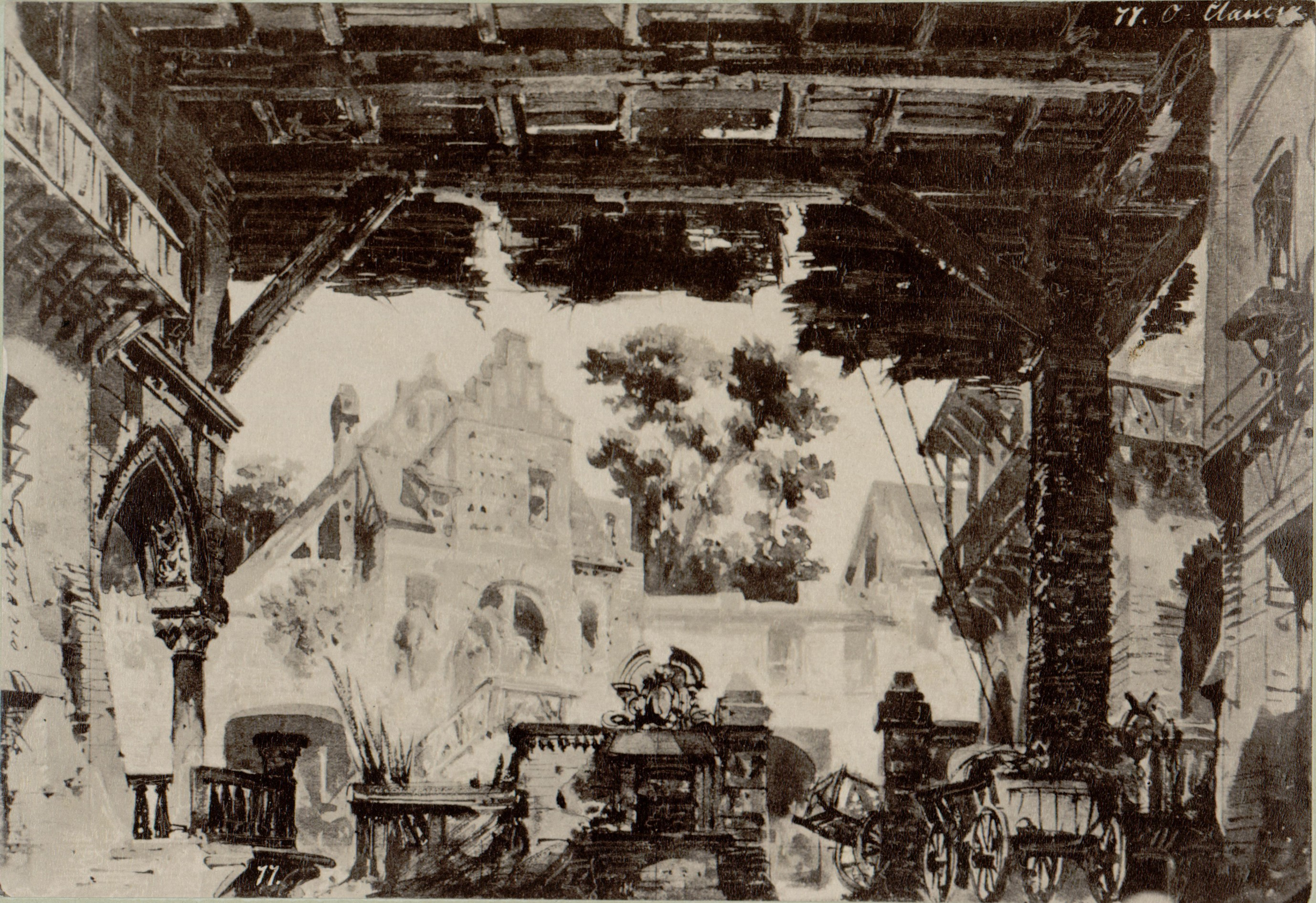
Piccolo cortile: casa di coloni intorno porticato, set design for Claudia (1866).

- Rosalia di San Miniato (melodramma semiserio, 2 acts, libretto by Callisto Bassi, 28 February 1845, Milan Conservatory)
- I due savoiardi (melodramma semiserio, 2 acts, libretto by Leopoldo Tarantini, 15 June 1846, Milan Conservatory)
- Don Bucefalo (melodramma semiserio, 3 acts, libretto by Callisto Bassi, 28 June 1847, Milan Conservatory)
- Il testamento di Figaro (melodramma comico, 2 acts, libretto by Callisto Bassi, 26 February 1848, Milan, Teatro Rè)
- Amori e trappole (melodramma giocoso, 3 acts, libretto by Felice Romani, 27 April 1850, Genoa, Teatro Carlo Felice)
- Il sindaco babbeo (opera comica, 3 acts, libretto by Giorgio Giachetti, 3 March 1851, Milan, Teatro di Santa Radegonda)
- La valle d'Andorra (melodramma semiserio, 2 acts, libretto by Giorgio Giachetti, 7 June 1851, Milan, Teatro della Canobbiana)
- Giralda (melodramma giocoso, 3 acts, libretto by Giorgio Giachetti and Raffaele Berninzone, 8 May 1852, Milan, Teatro di Santa Radegonda)
- La fioraia (melodramma giocoso, 3 acts, libretto by Giorgio Giachetti, 24 November 1853, Turin, Teatro Nazionale)
- La figlia di Don Liborio (opera buffa, 3 acts, libretto by Francesco Guidi, 18 October 1856, Genoa, Teatro Carlo Felice)
- Il vecchio della montagna ossia L'emiro (tragedia lirica, 4 acts, libretto by Francesco Guidi, 5 September 1860, Turin, Teatro Carignano)
- Michele Perrin (opera comica, 3 acts, libretto by Marco Marcelliano Marcello, 7 May 1864, Milan, Teatro di Santa Radegonda)
- Claudia (dramma lirico, 4 acts, libretto by Marco Marcelliano Marcello, 20 May 1866, Milan, Teatro della Canobbiana)
- La tombola (commedia lirica, 3 acts, libretto by Francesco Maria Piave, 18 January 1867, Rome, Torre Argentina)
- La vergine di Kermo (melodramma romantico, 3 acts, a pastiche also containing music by Carlo Pedrotti, Federico Ricci, Amilcare Ponchielli, Giovanni Pacini, Lauro Rossi, and Alberto Mazzucato, libretto by Francesco Guidi, 16 February 1870, Cremona, Teatro Concordia)
- Un capriccio di donna (melodramma serio, 1 prologue and 3 acts, libretto by Antonio Ghislanzoni, 10 March 1870, Genoa, Teatro Carlo Felice)
- Papà Martin (opera semiseria, 3 acts, libretto by Antonio Ghislanzoni, 4 March 1871, Genoa, Teatro Politeama Tivoli)
- Il duca di Tapigliano (opera comica, 1 prologue and 2 acts, libretto by Antonio Ghislanzoni, 10 October 1874, Lecco, Teatro Sociale)
- Francesca da Rimini' (tragedia lirica, 4 acts, libretto by Antonio Ghislanzoni, 19 February 1878, Turin, Teatro Regio)
- Re Lear (tragedia lirica, 4 acts, libretto by Antonio Ghislanzoni, 19 July 2009, Martina Franca, Festival della Valle d'Itria)
