= Alessandro Stradella (opera) =

Opera by Friedrich von Flotow

- Romantische Oper by Friedrich von Flotow
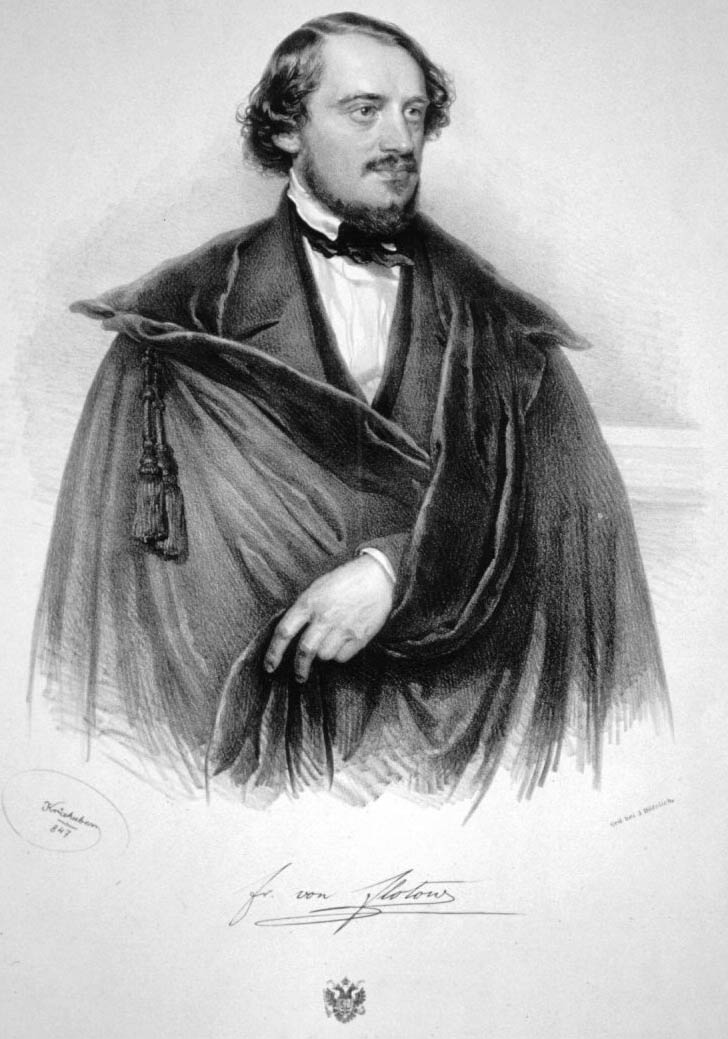
- The composer in 1847
- Librettist: Friedrich Wilhelm Riese
- Language: German
- Based on: Life of Alessandro Stradella
- Premiere: 30 December 1844; Stadttheater, Hamburg

Alessandro Stradella is a romantic opera (Romantische Oper) in three acts composed by Friedrich von Flotow to a German libretto by "Wilhelm Friedrich" (Friedrich Wilhelm Riese). Set in Venice and the countryside near Rome, it is loosely based on the colourful life of the 17th-century Italian composer and singer Alessandro Stradella. It was first performed in its full version on 30 December 1844 at the Stadttheater in Hamburg.

== Performance history ==
Alessandro Stradella began its life as Stradella, a one-act comédie en vaudeville which opened in Paris at the Théâtre du Palais-Royal on 2 February 1837. Flotow then revised and expanded the work to a full three-act opera which had a successful premiere at the Stadttheater in Hamburg on 30 December 1844. The work proved to be very popular in Germany and in Austria where its successful debut at the Theater am Kärntnertor in 1845 led to a commission from the theatre to compose another opera, Martha, which premiered there in 1847. Alessandro Stradella was performed in an Italian translation by Calisto Bassi in several opera houses in Italy, including the Teatro Carlo Felice in Genoa and the Teatro della Canobbiana in Milan. It was also heard in Warsaw at the Teatr Wielki in 1858, in Brussels at the Théâtre Royal de la Monnaie (in a French translation by Alphonse Royer) in 1859, in Paris at the Théâtre des Italiens (in Italian) in 1863, and in London at the Royal Opera House in 1864.

By the time it received its Metropolitan Opera premiere on 4 February 1910 with Leo Slezak as Stradella and Alma Gluck as Leonore, the work had nearly been forgotten. It received six performances at the Met that season, but then returned to relative obscurity, never achieving the more enduring popularity of Martha. The most notable 21st century revival was at Wexford Opera Festival in 2001 as part of the festival's 50th anniversary season. The Wexford production, directed by Thomas de Mallet Burgess and designed by Julian McGowan, set the opera in Flotow's time rather than Stradella's.

== Roles ==
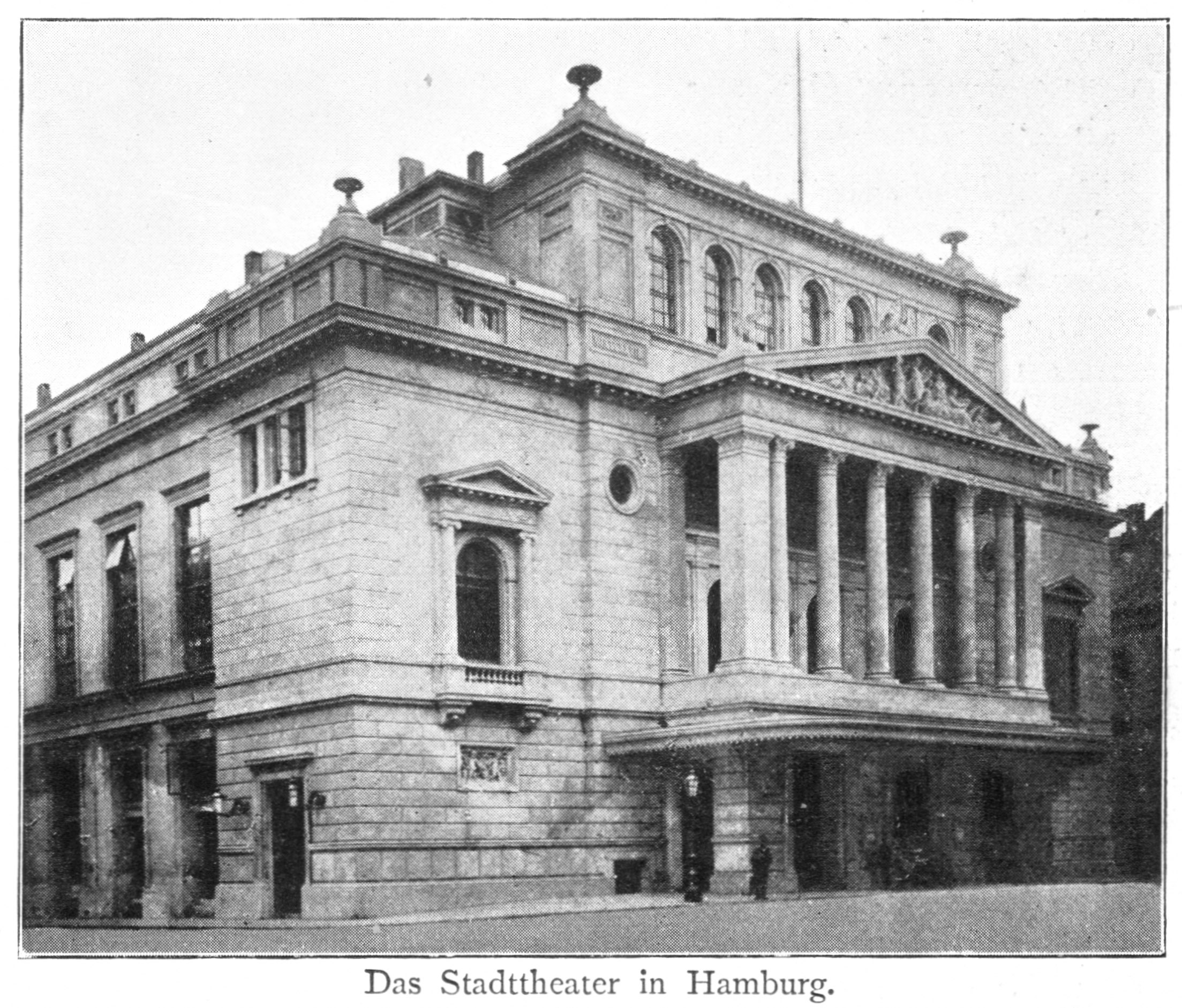
The Hamburg Stadttheater where Alessandro Stradella premiered in 1844

Roles, voice types, premiere cast
Role	Voice type	Premiere cast, 30 December 1844
Alessandro Stradella, a composer and music-teacher	tenor	
Bassi, a wealthy Venetian	bass	
Leonore, his ward	soprano	
Malvolio, a bandit	bass	August Gerstel
Barbarino, a bandit	baritone	
Pupils of Stradella, masks, villagers, pilgrims, distinguished citizens, patricians

== Synopsis ==
Place: Italy
Time: The 17th century

=== Act 1 ===
In and around the Piazza San Marco, Venice

Stradella and his music students hymn the city of Venice. They then serenade Leonore, Stradella's beloved. She is held against her will in the house of her guardian, Bassi, who is planning to marry her on the following day, and, when she appears on her balcony, Stradella proposes that they elope. A noisy carnival procession enables them to slip away together, while Bassi's attempts to pursue them are impeded by the masked revellers.

=== Act 2 ===
Outside Stradella's country house near Rome

Leonore rejoices at her impending marriage to Stradella. The couple leave for the ceremony. The bandits Malvolio and Barbarino appear separately, and discover that each has been engaged by Bassi to assassinate Stradella. Claiming to be pilgrims, they introduce themselves to the happy couple, and Stradella welcomes them to the celebrations. He sings of the compassion that lurks in the hearts of even the lowest members of society, and the bandits, moved, abandon their mission.

=== Act 3 ===
In and around Stradella's country house.

Stradella and Leonore, joined by the bandits, sing of the beauties of Italy. The happy couple join a group of pilgrims. Bassi arrives and discovers that his instructions have not been carried out, but, when he offers the bandits more money, they agree again to murder Stradella. Bassi joins them. As they advance to do the deed, Stradella rehearses, with the pilgrims, a hymn in praise of the Virgin Mary, whose festival is on the following day. Its message is that she will forgive evil-doers who turn to the paths of righteousness, and the three conspirators, still clutching their daggers, are overwhelmed with emotion and, kneeling, join in the hymn. Leonore enters, and Bassi confesses. She and Stradella forgive him and his henchmen, and the opera ends with Stradella's arrival on a hillside in front of a picture of the Madonna, where the pilgrims rejoice in the power of his music and of divine grace.
