= Tempio Voltiano =

Museum and monument dedicated to Alessandro Volta in Como, Italy

- Tempio Voltiano
- The Tempio Voltiano seen from the southwest

- Location within Lombardy
- Established: July 15, 1928
- Location: Lungo Lario Marconi, Como, Lombardy, Italy
- Coordinates: 45°48′53″N 9°04′31″E
- Type: Biographical museum, Science museum
- Collections: Scientific instruments, personal effects, honours of Alessandro Volta
- Founder: Francesco Somaini (financier)
- Curator: Musei Civici di Como
- Architect: Federico Frigerio
- Website: www.visitcomo.eu/en/discover/museums/voltiano-temple/

The Tempio Voltiano (Volta Temple) is a museum in the city of Como, Lombardy, Italy, dedicated to the scientist Alessandro Volta (1745–1827). A prolific physicist renowned for inventing the first electrical battery (the voltaic pile), Volta was born in Como and spent much of his life there, holding his first professorship at Como's Royal School from 1774 to 1779 before eventually retiring to the city in 1819. The museum, designed in the Neoclassical style, stands on the shore of Lake Como and houses a collection of original scientific instruments used by Volta, alongside his personal effects and honours.

== History ==
The idea for a permanent museum dedicated to Volta's scientific legacy arose after a devastating fire in 1899 destroyed a large temporary exhibition set up in Como to mark the centenary of the invention of the voltaic pile. Many original instruments and documents were lost in the fire, highlighting the need for a secure location to preserve the surviving relics.

The project gained momentum approaching the centenary of Volta's death (1927). Generous funding was provided by the cotton industrialist and senator Francesco Somaini, who commissioned the building as a gift to the city. The chosen architect was Federico Frigerio, known for his work on restoring historical buildings in the Como area. Construction began in 1925 and the building was completed in 1927, though its official inauguration took place on 15 July 1928.

The building suffered damage from flooding in the mid-20th century but underwent subsequent restoration work. It remains a key landmark on Como's lakefront and is managed as part of the city's civic museum network (Musei Civici di Como).

== Architecture ==
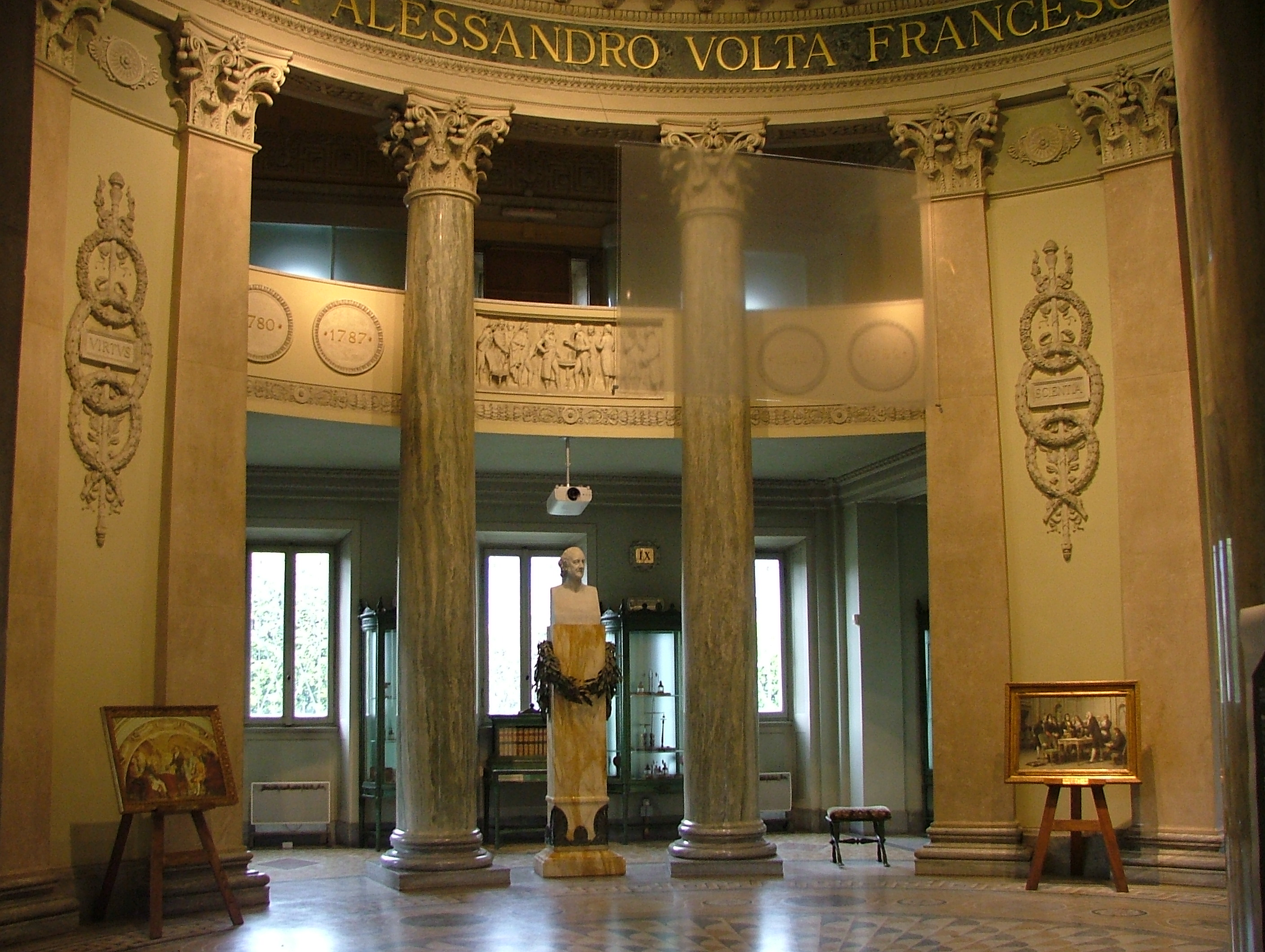
Interior view of the main hall.

Designed by Federico Frigerio, the Tempio Voltiano is a prominent example of Neoclassical architecture, drawing direct inspiration from the Pantheon in Rome. The building has a square base, approximately 26 meters wide, surmounted by a large circular hall topped with a high dome, reaching a total height of nearly 26 meters. Its exterior features imposing Corinthian columns and statues representing Science and Faith.

The interior consists of a spacious circular hall, around 12 meters in diameter, illuminated by natural light from the dome's oculus and large windows. An upper gallery, supported by columns, runs around the perimeter of the hall. The floor is decorated with a mosaic. The building is constructed primarily from reinforced concrete, clad externally with Karst stone. Frigerio intended the building not just as a museum but as a secular "temple" dedicated to Volta and the celebration of scientific achievement.

== Collection ==
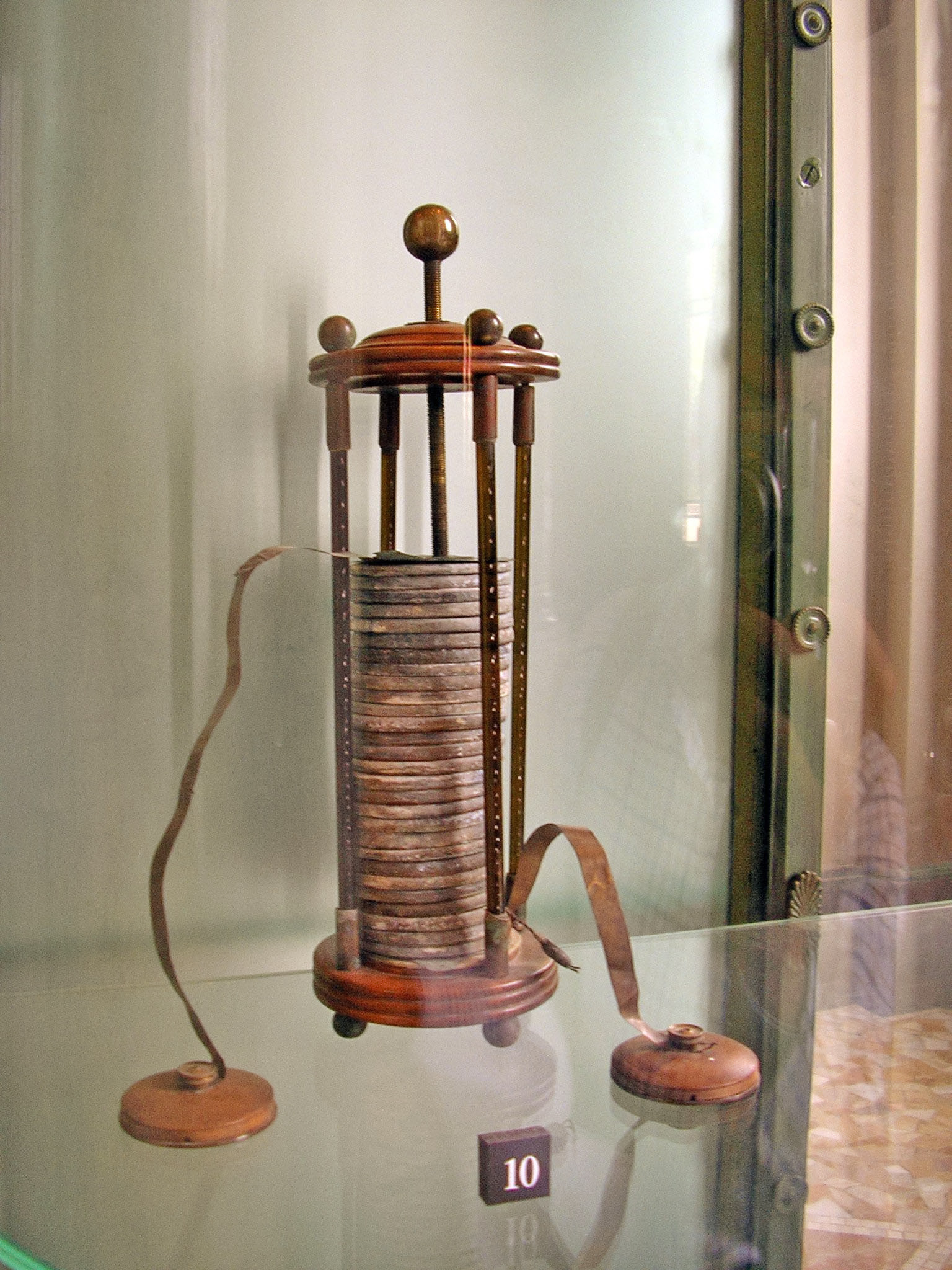
A voltaic pile display

The museum was established specifically to house the original instruments and documents belonging to Alessandro Volta that survived the 1899 fire, alongside copies of those lost. The main exhibits are arranged chronologically and thematically within display cases on the ground floor of the large central hall. These showcase Volta's key experiments and inventions across different fields:

- Early electrical devices: Including various versions of his groundbreaking voltaic pile (the first electric battery), capacitors, Leyden jars, electrophori, and sensitive electrometers and electroscopes used to detect and measure electric charge.
- Gas studies equipment: Devices used by Volta in his studies of gases, particularly methane (which he discovered), such as eudiometers, his electric pistol, and a lamp based on hydrogen combustion.

The upper gallery houses Volta's personal effects, honours, and awards, including medals, decorations presented by rulers like Napoleon Bonaparte, and publications detailing his work.

== Cultural significance ==
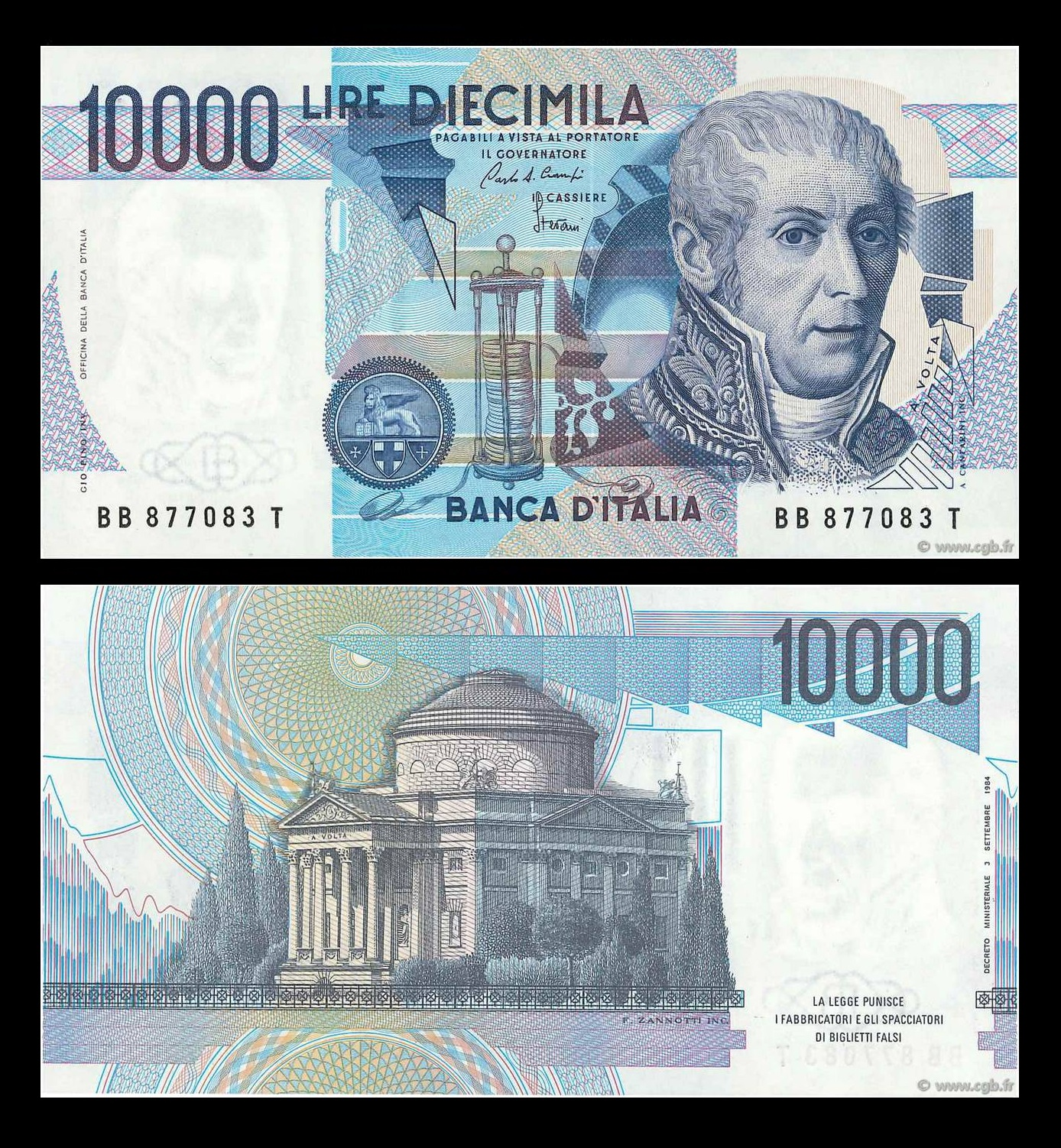
The Tempio Voltiano featured on the back of the 10,000 Italian lira banknote (1984–2001), with Volta's portrait on the front.

The Tempio Voltiano is a major landmark in Como and a significant monument to one of Italy's most important scientists. Its distinctive profile was featured prominently on the reverse side of the Italian 10,000 lire banknote issued between 1984 and 2001 (with Volta's portrait on the obverse).

The building stands near other Volta-related monuments along the Como lakefront, including the modern sculpture Life Electric (2015) by Daniel Libeskind located on the outer breakwater, and the Faro Voltiano (Volta Lighthouse), built in 1927, situated on a nearby hill at Brunate.

== See also ==
- Como Conference
- University History Museum, University of Pavia (also holds Volta-related items)
