= Life Electric =

Iron sculpture designed by Daniel Libeskind on Lake Como, Italy

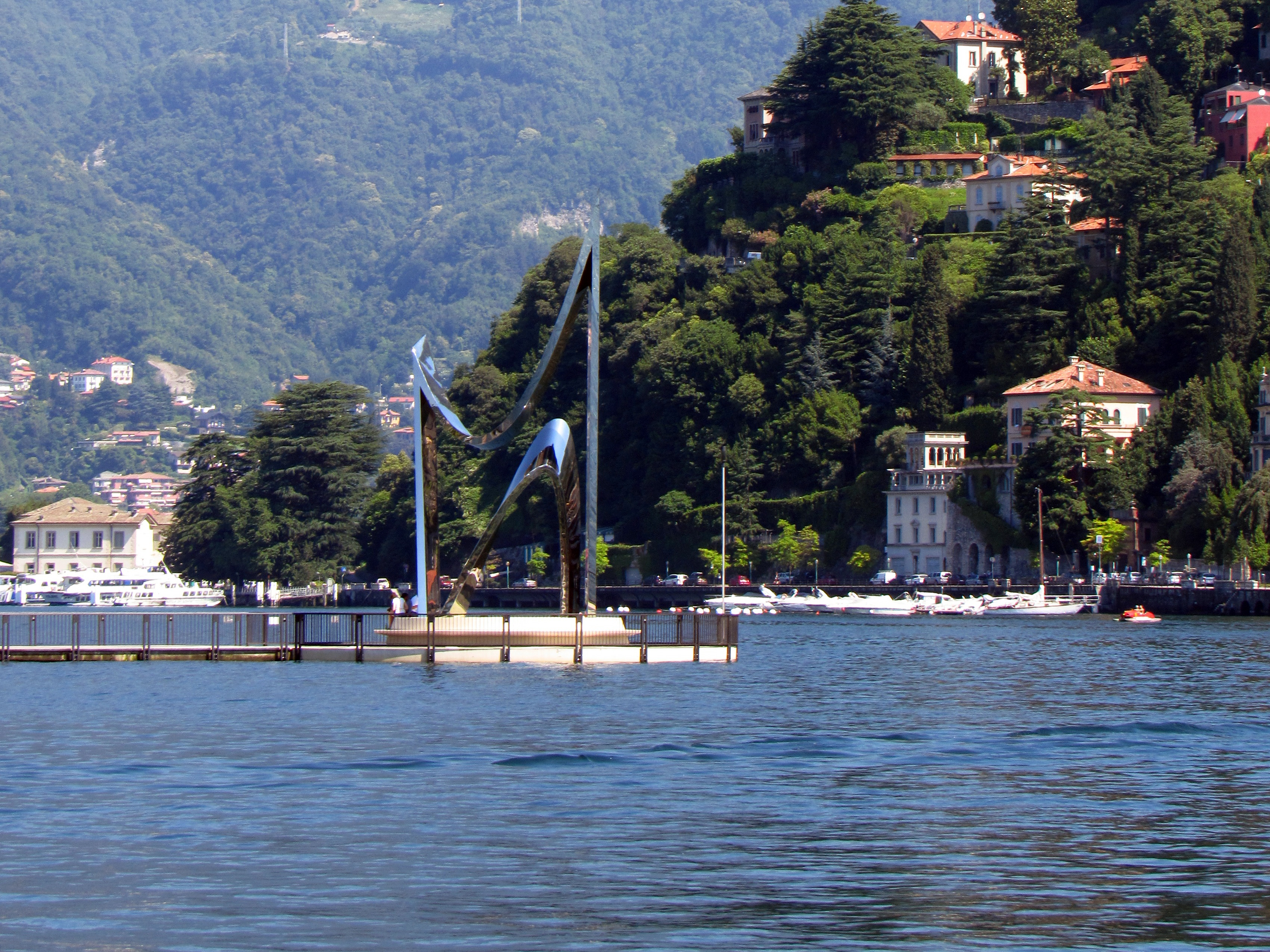
- Front view of Life Electric on Lake Como. Location of Como within Lombardy Life Electric (Italy)
- Artist: Daniel Libeskind
- Year: 2015
- Completion date: August 2015 (inaugurated October 2015)
- Type: Sculpture
- Medium: Stainless Steel
- Subject: Homage to Alessandro Volta
- Dimensions: 13.75 m (13.75 m (45.1 ft) in); Height: 13.75 m (14.25 m with base)
- Weight: 11,000 kg (11 t)
- Location: Como; 45°48′55.4″N 9°04′48.9″E
- Owner: Municipality of Como
- Preceded by: Mons International Congress Xperience
- Website: www.thelifelectric.it

Life Electric (sometimes referred to as The Life Electric) is a contemporary sculpture by Daniel Libeskind, dedicated to the physicist Alessandro Volta (1745–1827). Completed in 2015, it is installed on the breakwater (Diga Foranea) in Lake Como, Como, Italy.

The work was commissioned by the non-profit association Amici di Como. Libeskind, who established an architecture school in Como in 1988, donated the design to the city. Project documents state the design relates to the Rationalism movement in architecture, prominent in Como in the 1920s-1930s.

== History ==
Construction of Life Electric began in September 2014. The estimated cost for the construction and pier reinforcement was reported as €599,926.07. While Libeskind donated the design, the construction costs, including work to reinforce the pier, were funded by the Amici di Como through donations. The technical project review was conducted by architect/engineer Antonio Gianmarco Martorana Capsoni and validated by Mercury Engineering SpA.

The initial target completion date was 1 May 2015, coinciding with the opening of Expo 2015 in Milan. However, the project experienced delays, reportedly including 19 days due to weather and 25 days for a summer break. Construction finished in August 2015, after approximately 119 additional days.

The official inauguration took place on 2 October 2015. Attendees included the mayor of Como, Daniel Libeskind and his family, Luigi Martino Volta (a descendant of Alessandro Volta), and actress Nastassja Kinski. Events included a reception at the Yacht Club Como and a presentation at the Aero Club Como hangar. A local ice cream shop created a flavor named "Life Electric" for the occasion.

== Location ==
Life Electric is situated at the end of the Diga Foranea breakwater (pier), which extends into Lake Como. This pier, named after the physicist Piero Caldirola, required structural consolidation to support the sculpture. The location places the sculpture between two other local landmarks associated with Volta: the Tempio Voltiano museum and the Faro Voltiano lighthouse. The pier is publicly accessible via the Lungolago Mafalda di Savoia promenade. The placement was intended to provide high visibility for the artwork.

== Structure ==
The sculpture stands 13.75 meters (45.1 ft) tall, or 14.25 meters (46.8 ft) including its base. It consists of two opposing sine wave-like forms made of calendared steel clad in 6 mm thick stainless steel (type 316) panels. The total weight is approximately 11,000 kg (11 t; 12.1 short tons).

At the base, a circular stone wall (75 cm high) contains a shallow pool of water (10 cm deep) intended to reflect the monument. The base was designed to allow seating underneath the structure. Due to its size and weight, the sculpture components were transported across Lake Como by barge and assembled on the pier using a crane.

The pier's structure required reinforcement before installation, involving underwater work by divers in early 2015. The sculpture incorporates a waterproof LED lighting system with over 300 points and smoke effects, designed for nighttime illumination, while the polished steel surfaces reflect the surrounding lake and landscape during the day.

== Design Concept ==
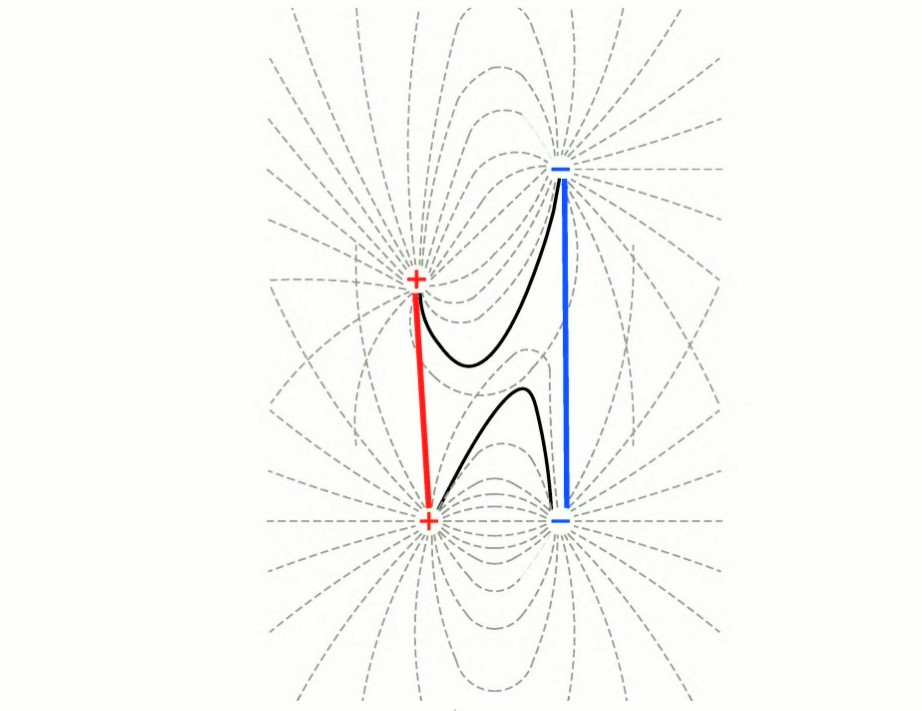
Design sketch attributed to Daniel Libeskind

According to the architect, the form of Life Electric is inspired by the electric tension between the two poles of a battery, honoring Alessandro Volta's invention. The project description positions the sculpture as an "idealistic third pole" connecting the nearby Voltiano Lighthouse and Tempio Voltiano. The design is intended to evoke connections between light, wind, and water. Libeskind stated the work aims "to create geometries that connect the sky, lake and mountains," reflecting the Lake Como landscape and metaphorically representing Volta's scientific contributions.

The Life Electric is inspired by the electric tension between two poles of a battery, the great gift from Volta to the humanity.

— Daniel Libeskind, As described in Como municipal project documentation

== Public Reaction and Controversy ==
The project generated public debate in Como. In October 2014, the local political group Adesso Como initiated a petition calling for a referendum on whether the sculpture should be installed at the proposed location. Concerns were raised by some citizens and architects regarding the potential visual impact of the large-scale sculpture on the lake's landscape. By December 2014, the petition reportedly gathered 4,478 signatures, exceeding the threshold required to request a referendum.

However, in August 2015, the municipal government (giunta) decided not to proceed with the referendum. Reasons cited included the advanced stage of construction and the estimated cost of holding the referendum (€180,559).

== Images ==
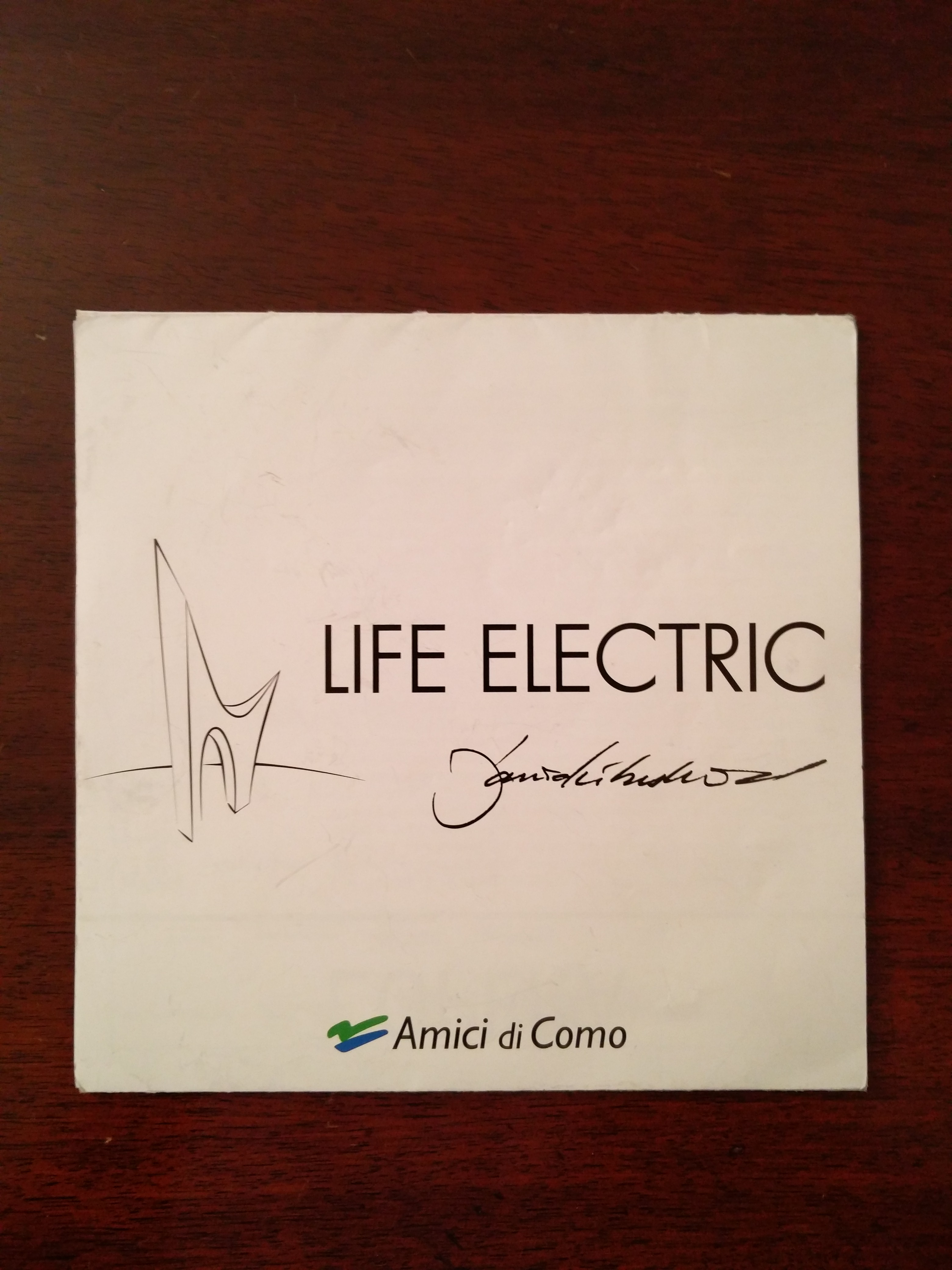
Inauguration Flyer (Front)

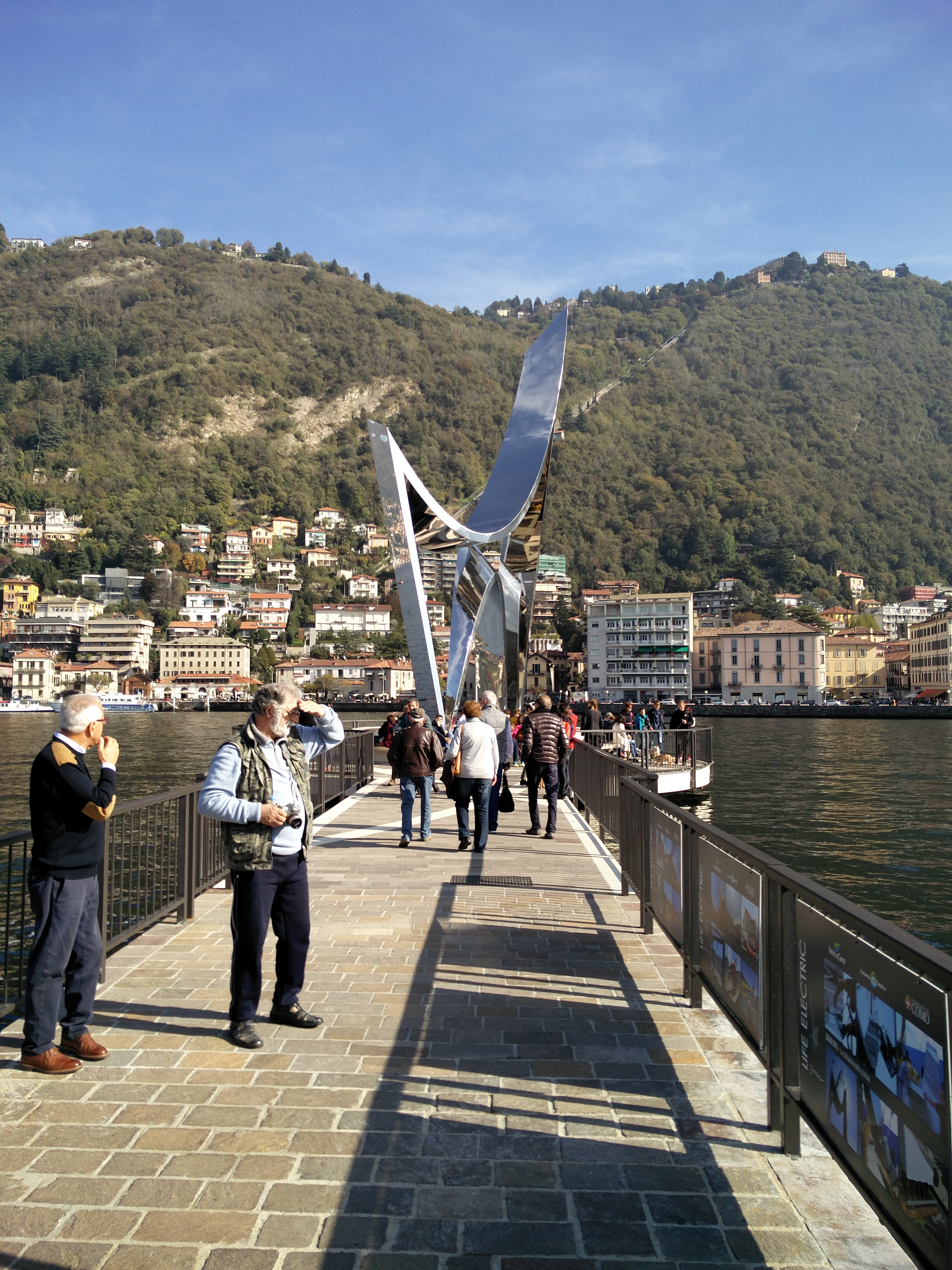
View from the Diga Foranea breakwater

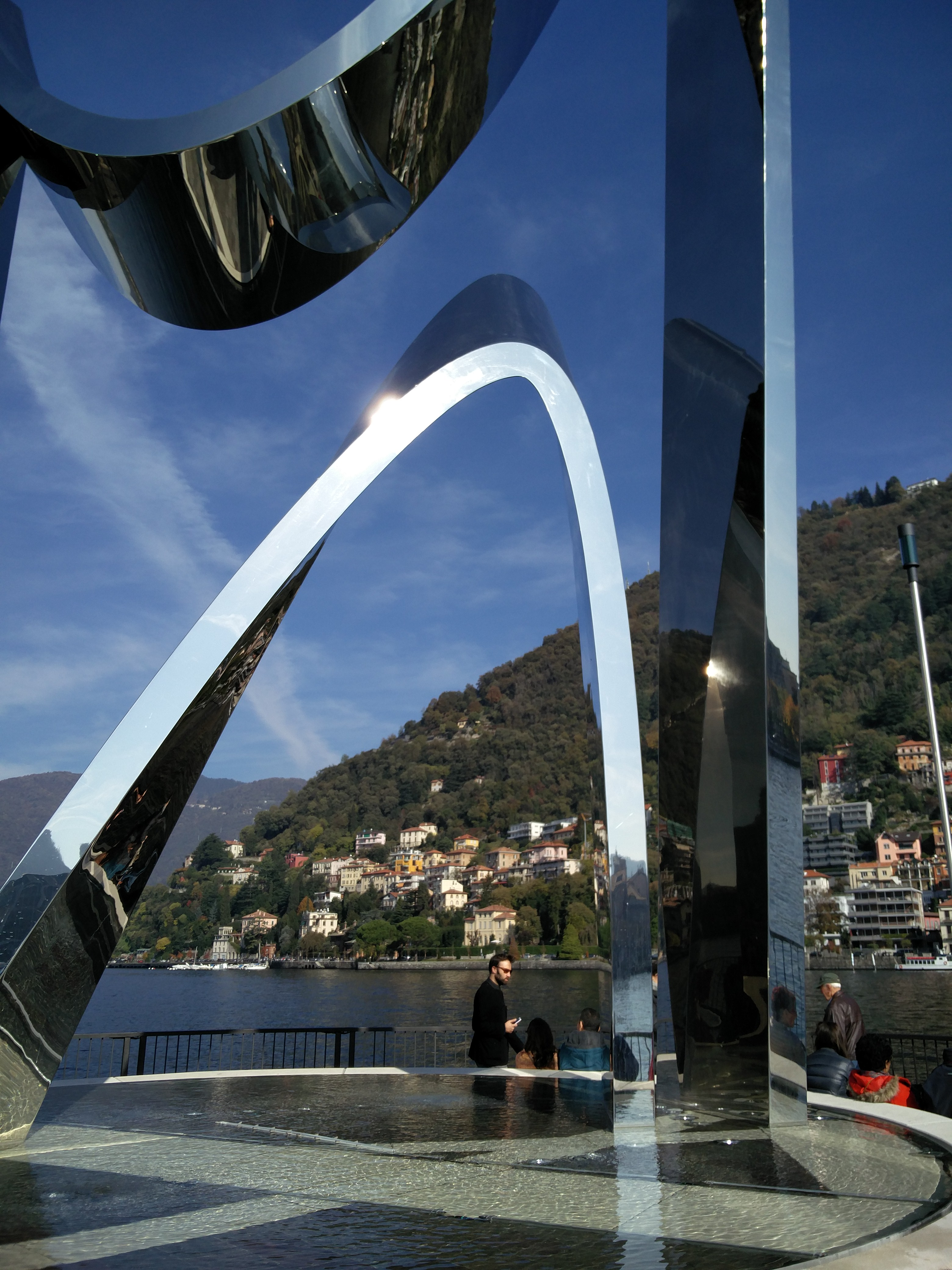
Close-up view from below

== See also ==
- Daniel Libeskind
- Alessandro Volta
- Rationalism (particularly in Como, e.g., Giuseppe Terragni)
- List of tallest statues
