= Monument to the Fallen, Como =

Coordinates: 45°48′54″N 9°04′25″E

Monument to the Fallen
- Monumento ai caduti
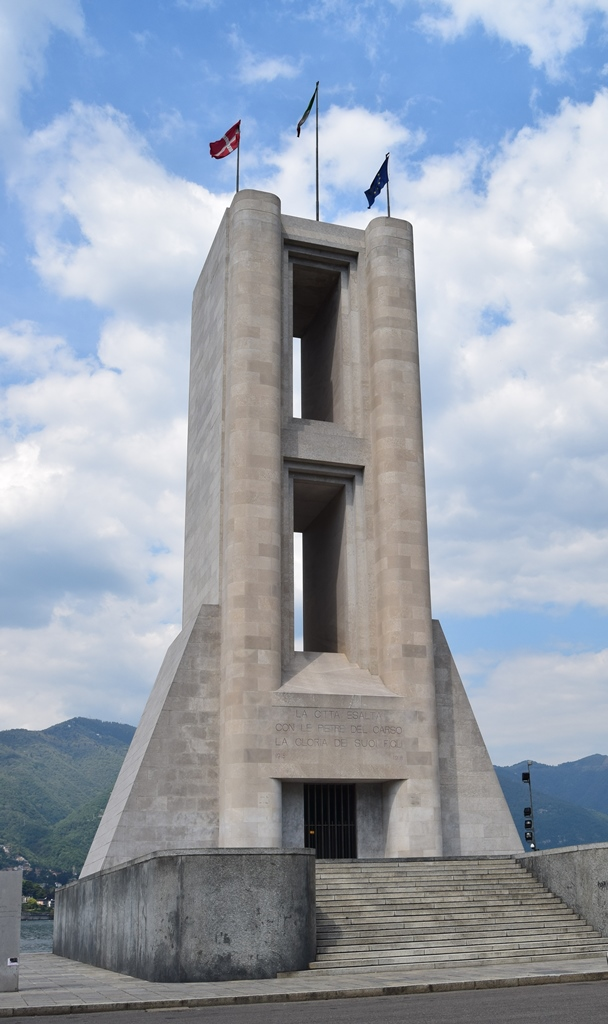
- The monument in 2016
- Interactive map of Monument to the Fallen
- Location: Lake Como, Como, Italy
- Designer: Giuseppe Terragni
- Type: Tower
- Material: Stone clad reinforced concrete
- Height: 30 metres (98 ft)
- Weight: 400 tonnes (390 long tons; 440 short tons)
- Beginning date: 1930
- Completion date: 1933
- Dedicated date: November 4, 1933
- Dedicated to: Fallen soldiers of World War I
- Website: cittadicomo.it/en/point-of-interest/monument-to-the-fallen

The Monument to the Fallen (Italian: Monumento ai caduti) is a war memorial on the shore of Lake Como, in Como, Italy.
