= Friedrich von Flotow =

German composer (1812–1883)

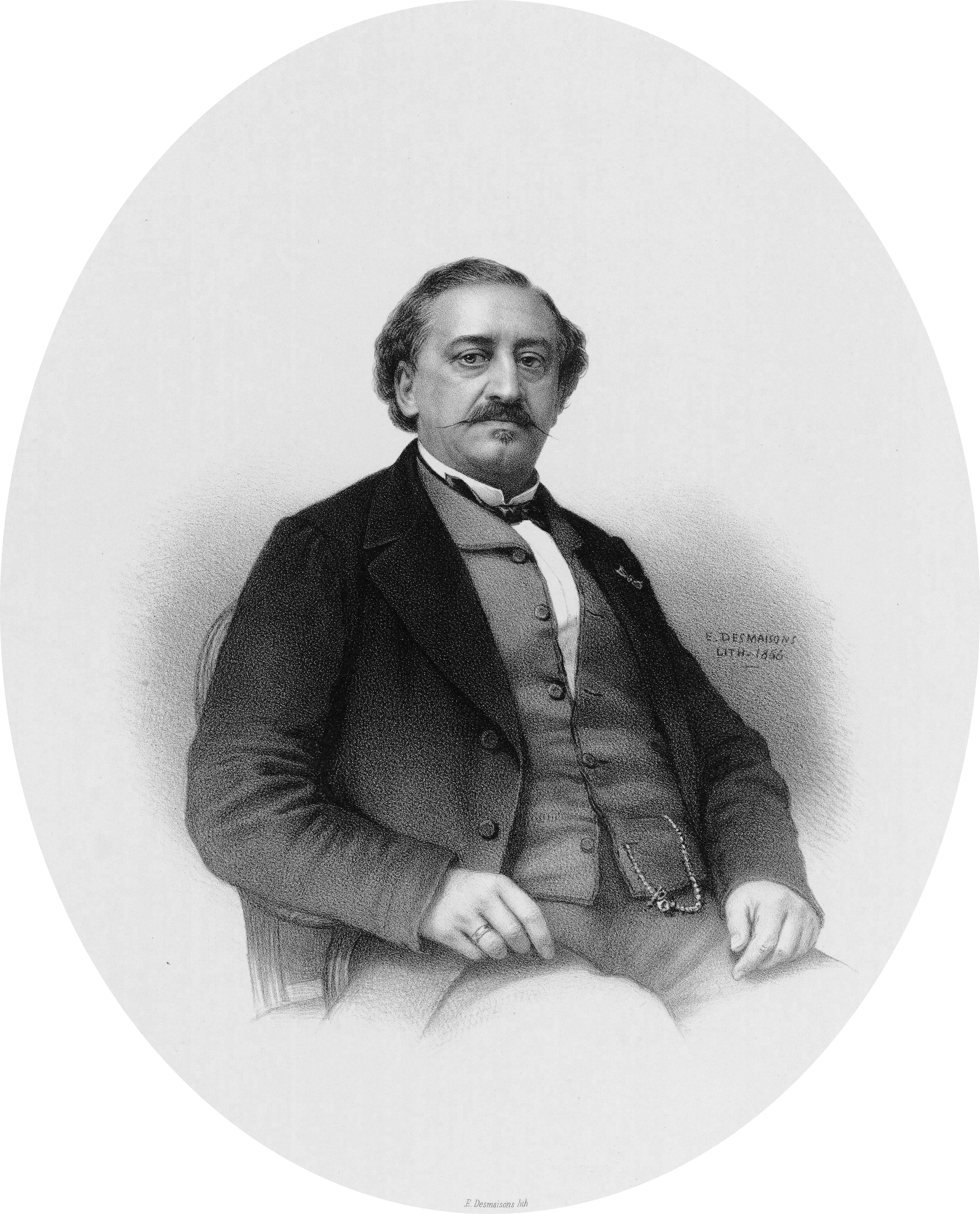
- Friedrich von Flotow, 1866
- Born: 27 April 1812; Teutendorf, Duchy of Mecklenburg-Schwerin
- Died: 24 January 1883 (aged 70); Darmstadt, German Empire
- Era: Romantic
- Works: List of operas by Friedrich von Flotow

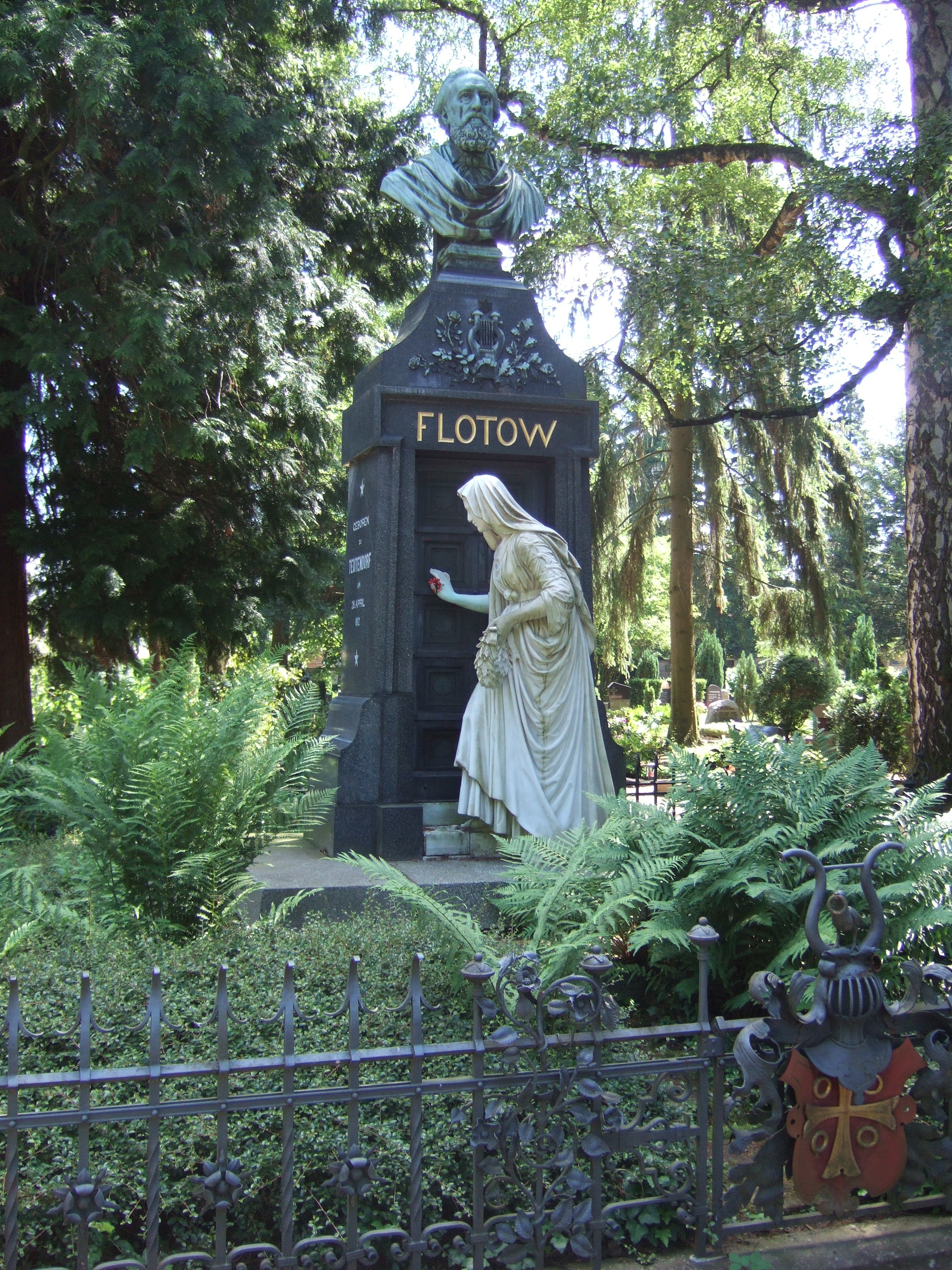
Grave of Friedrich von Flotow in the "Alter Friedhof" (old cemetery) in Darmstadt, Germany

Friedrich Adolf Ferdinand, Freiherr von Flotow (German: [ˈfʁiːdʁɪç fɔn ˈfloːto]; 27 April 1812 – 24 January 1883) was a German composer. He is chiefly remembered for his opera Martha, which was popular in the 19th century and the early part of the 20th.

== Life ==
Born in Teutendorf, in Mecklenburg, into an aristocratic family, Flotow was French-trained. Although he was intended for a diplomatic career, his father acceded to his wishes and he studied at the Conservatoire de Paris under Anton Reicha. During this time came under the influence of Auber, Bellini, Rossini, Meyerbeer, Donizetti, Halévy, and later Gounod and Offenbach. These influences are reflected in his operas, where a distinctive French opéra comique flavour exists.

During the 1830 revolution he returned home, writing chamber music and operetta until it was safe to return to Paris. He completed his first opera in 1835, Pierre et Cathérine, but his breakthrough came with Le naufrage de la Méduse (1839), based on the wreck of the warship Méduse. The three-act romantic opera Alessandro Stradella of 1844 is recognized as one of Flotow's finer works. Martha was first staged in Vienna at the Theater am Kärntnertor on 25 November 1847, and soon became one of the best-loved of all his operas.

In 1848 revolution again drove Flotow home. Between 1856 and 1863 he served as Intendant of the court theatre at Schwerin. From 1863 he lived in either Paris or Vienna, and he had the satisfaction of seeing his operas mounted as far away as Saint Petersburg and Turin. He died in Darmstadt.

== Works ==
=== Operas ===
In all, Flotow wrote about 30 operas. Many of these works were performed in different versions and under different titles, in German, French and sometimes other languages. Some survive, some are lost. All but Martha have fallen into obscurity, and even Martha is not nearly as often performed now as it was a century ago, though it is still sometimes staged, and there have been a number of attempts to revive other Flotow works (including Alessandro Stradella) during recent years.

The best-known single piece by Flotow is probably "Ach! so fromm, ach! so traut". It has been much recorded in its Italian version, "M'apparì tutt'amor".

=== Ballets ===
Completion	Title	Length	Première	Libretto	Choreography
1844	Lady Henriette ou "La servante de Greenwich"; second act by Friedrich Burgmüller; third act by Edouard Deldevez	3 acts	21 February 1844, Paris, Opéra	Jules-Henri Vernoy de Saint-Georges, after the Vaudeville La Comtesse d'Egmont	Joseph Mazilier
1856	Die Libelle ("La demoiselle" or "Le papillon" or "Dolores")	2 acts	1856, Bad Doberan in Schwerin	Johann Christian Markwort	
1858	Die Gruppe der Thetis		18 August 1858, Schwerin	Johann Christian Markwort	
1861	Der Tannkönig, ein Weihnachtsmärchen		22 December 1861, Schwerin	Eduard Hobein	
