= Filippo Cammarano =

Italian playwright and actor

- Born: 16 August 1764; Palermo
- Died: 9 December 1842; Naples
- Occupations: Playwright; Actor
- Parents: Vincenzo Cammarano; Caterina Sapuppo
- Writing career
- Language: Italian, Neapolitan
- Period: 1775–1832
- Notable works: Rachele e Ippolita; Annella tavernara di Porta Capuana; Lli funnacchere de lo Molo Piccolo; Lo Sguizzero 'mbriaco dint'a lo vascio di sie Stella; Pulcinella molinaro

Filippo Cammarano (16 August 1764 – 19 December 1842) was an Italian playwright and actor from the Kingdom of Naples. He wrote in Italian and Neapolitan more than one hundred plays and poems, and introduced a more modern theater in Naples, by adapting Carlo Goldoni's work and often dramatizing the lives, values, and conflicts of the complex and layered Neapolitan society.

== Biography ==
Filippo Cammarano was born in Palermo in 1764. His father was the actor Vincenzo Cammarano who played successfully the role of Pulcinella for more than thirty years in the San Carlino theater in Naples.

Giancola Cammarano and his second wife Caterina Sapuppo moved to Naples when Filippo was in young age. There, Filippo learned the art of theater with his father, taking over the role of Pulcinella, before dedicating himself to secondary character actor roles, first in the Fenice theater, then in San Carlino.

As a playwright, he published more than one hundred plays and poems, varying the genres, from comedy to drama.

He first adapted Gennaro D'Avino's Annella tavernara di Porta Capuana, a successful play from 1747, and then some works by Carlo Goldoni. This work of adaptation allowed him to introduce in the Kingdom of Naples a relatively new form of cultivated comedy, where the dynamism of the commedia dell'arte is associated with the comedy of intrigue. In the plays, the author introduced a certain realism in the depiction of the behaviors and characters, and often represented the struggle of the poor-folk, as opposed to the intrigues of the nobility. They often spoke the language of the Neapolitan dialect. Filippo Cammarano's plays often offer stories taken from One Thousand and One Nights or even inspired from contemporary facts, like the brigandage.

He married the singer Rosalia Vitellaro, with whom he fathered nine children, many of whom devoted themselves to the theater. Finally, he retired from the stage in 1832, and the king Ferdinand II of Bourbon granted him a pension of 30 ducats. He thanked him with a poem: Vierze strambe e bisbetece.
