= Italian Neoclassical architecture =

Architectural style in Italy

Italian Neoclassical architecture refers to architecture in Italy during the Neoclassical period (1750s–1850s).

== History and influences ==
In the 1750s and 1760s, the rich and frivolous Rococo was going out of fashion, and there was a growing desire to return to the simple, yet elegant classicism of architecture in Ancient Greece, Ancient Rome and to a lesser extent Renaissance architecture. In its purest form it is this new style principally derived from the architecture of Classical Greece and the architecture of Pompeii and Herculaneum. Since it was widely based on Classicism, the movement was named Neo-Classicism. Neoclassical did not particularly evolve in any particular nation, but the founders were France, England, Italy, Germany and Spain. Everything from villas, palaces, gardens, interiors and art began to be based on Roman and Greek themes.

== Buildings and edifices ==
Before the discoveries of the lost cities of Pompeii and Herculaneum, buildings were themed on Ancient Rome and Classical Athens, but were later inspired by these archaeological sites. Examples of Neoclassical architecture in Italy includen the Royal Palace of Caserta in 1752 (some parts), Luigi Cagnola's Arco della Pace, the San Carlo Theatre (Naples, 1810), San Francesco di Paola (Naples, 1817), Pedrocchi Café (Padua, 1816), Canova Temple, (Posagno, 1819), Teatro Carlo Felice (Genoa, 1827) and the Cisternone (Livorno, 1829).

== Gallery ==
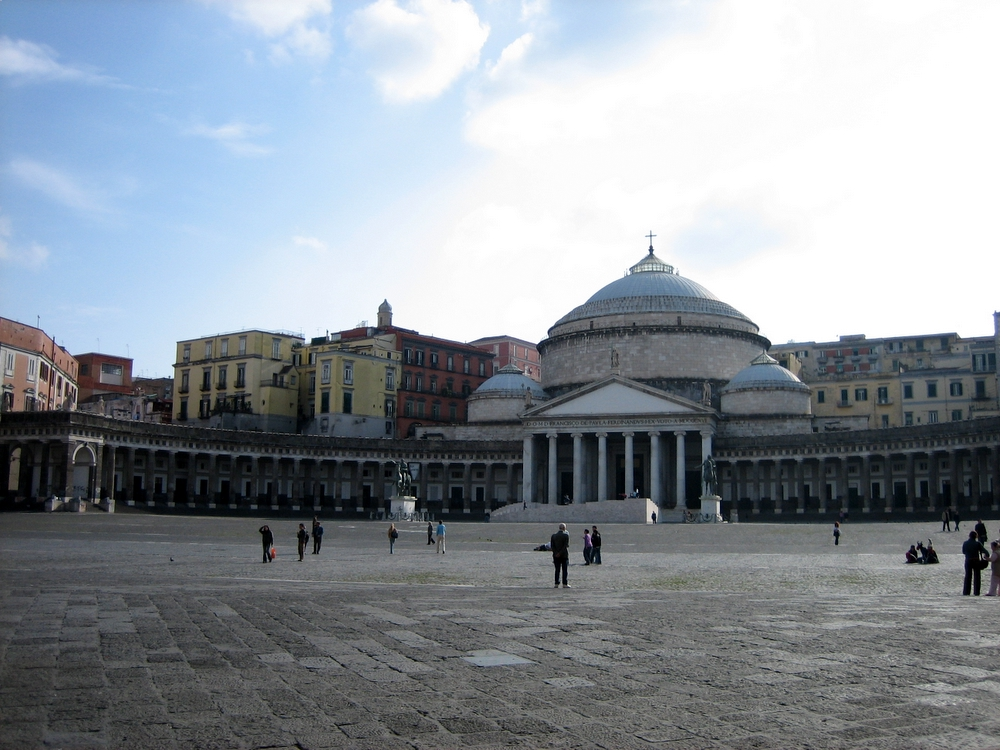
The Church of San Francesco di Paola (Naples)

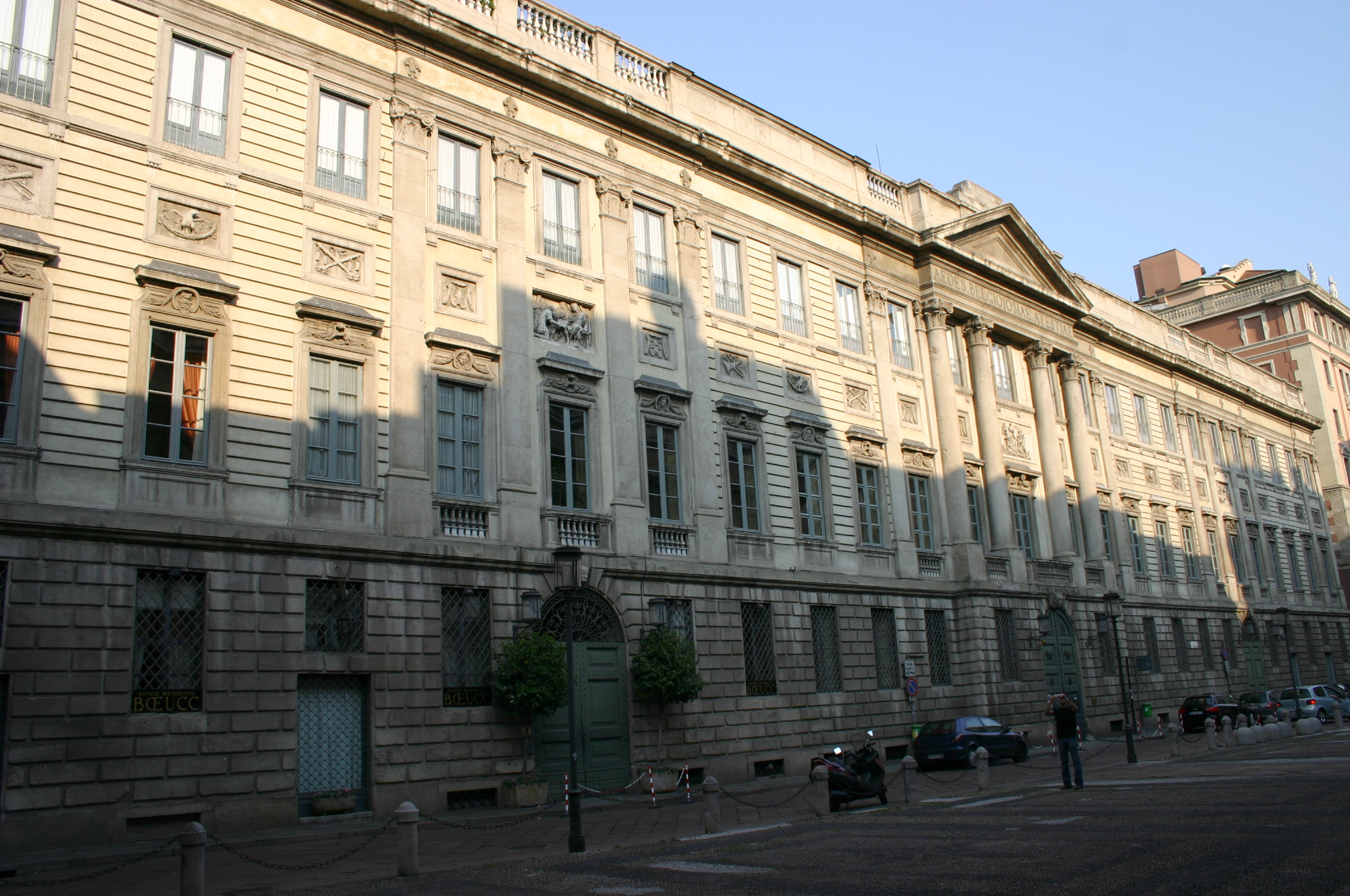
Palazzo Belgiojoso, Milan

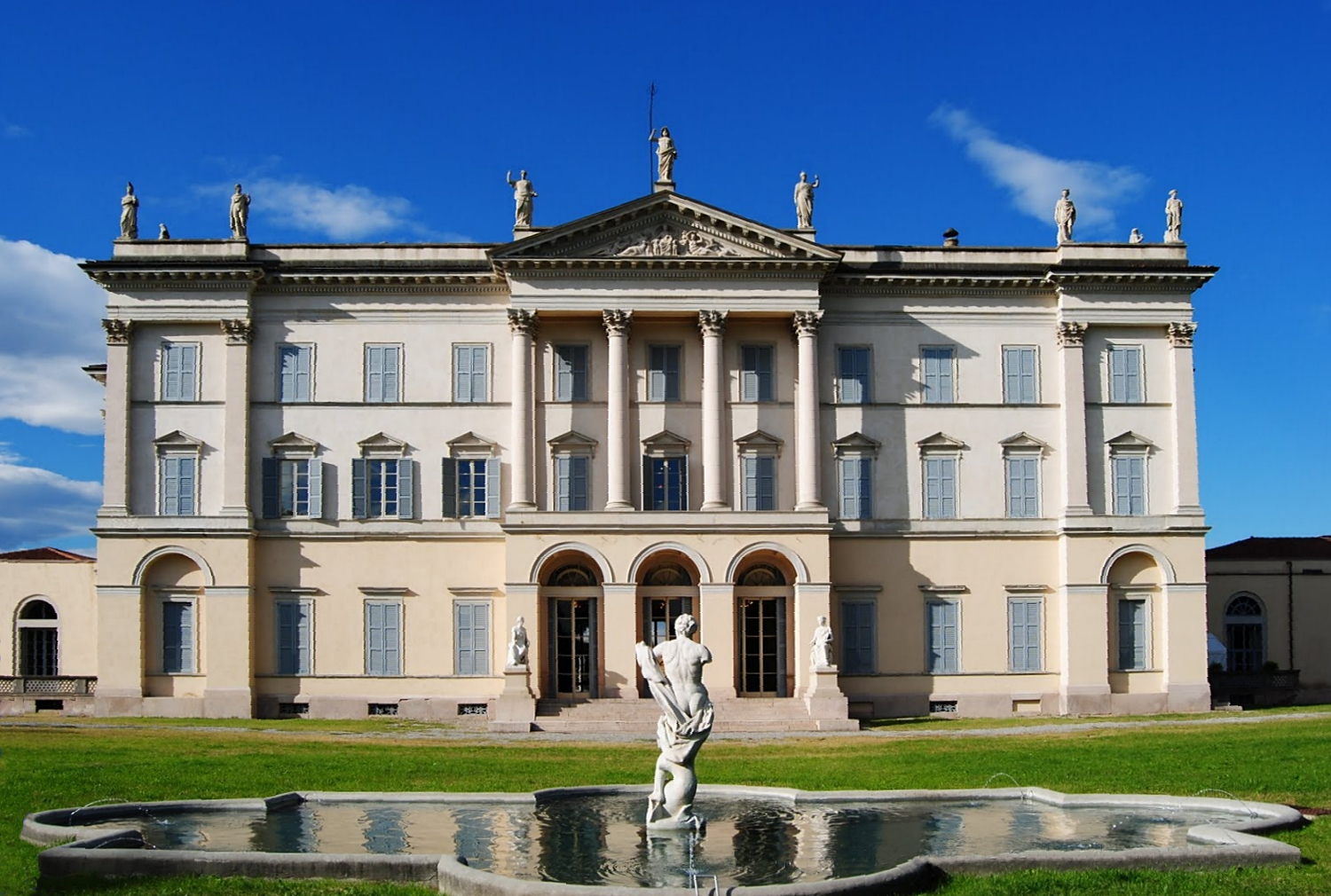
Villa Tittoni Traversi, Desio, garden facade

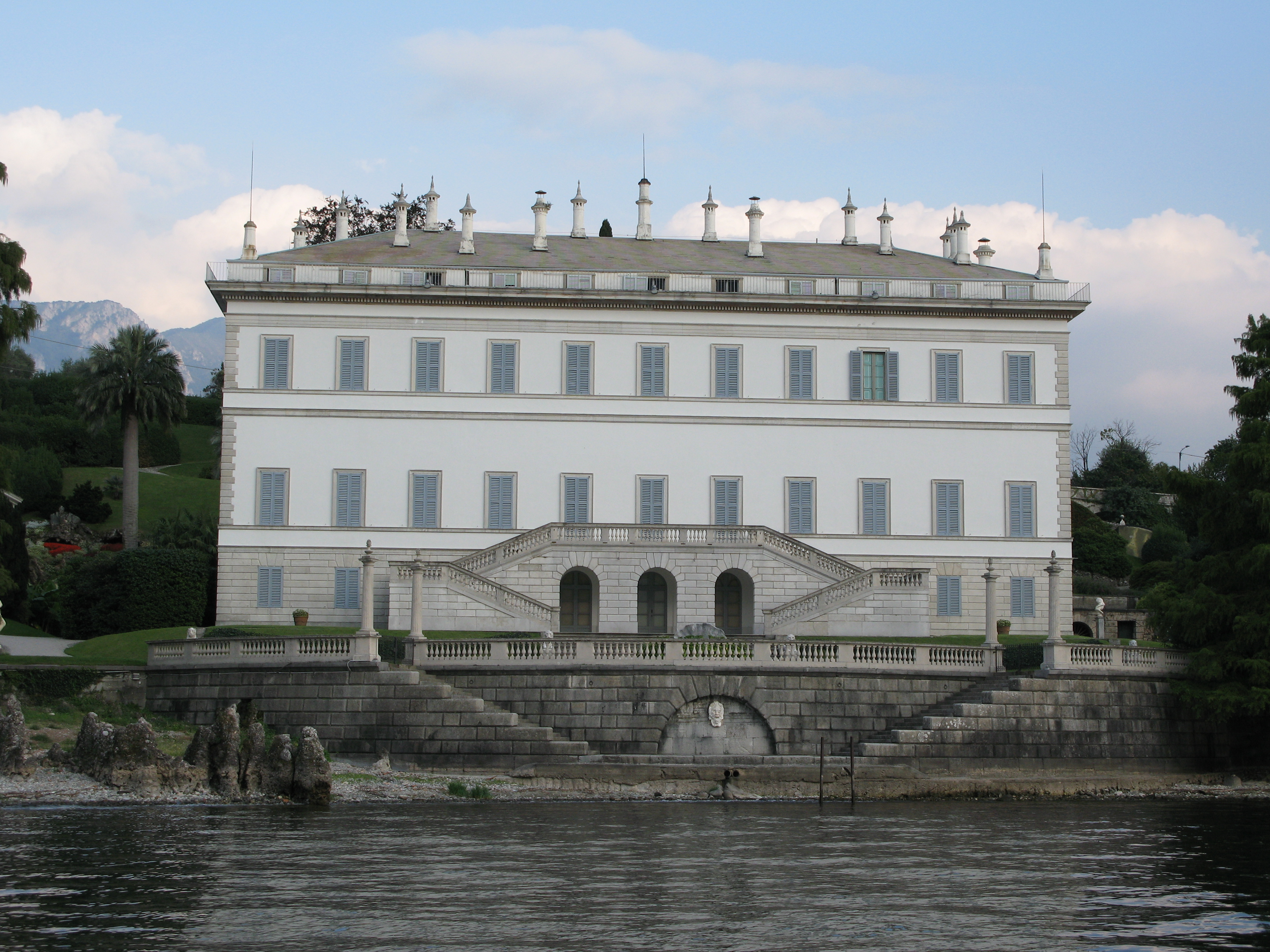
A view from Lake Como on the Neoclassical Villa Melzi

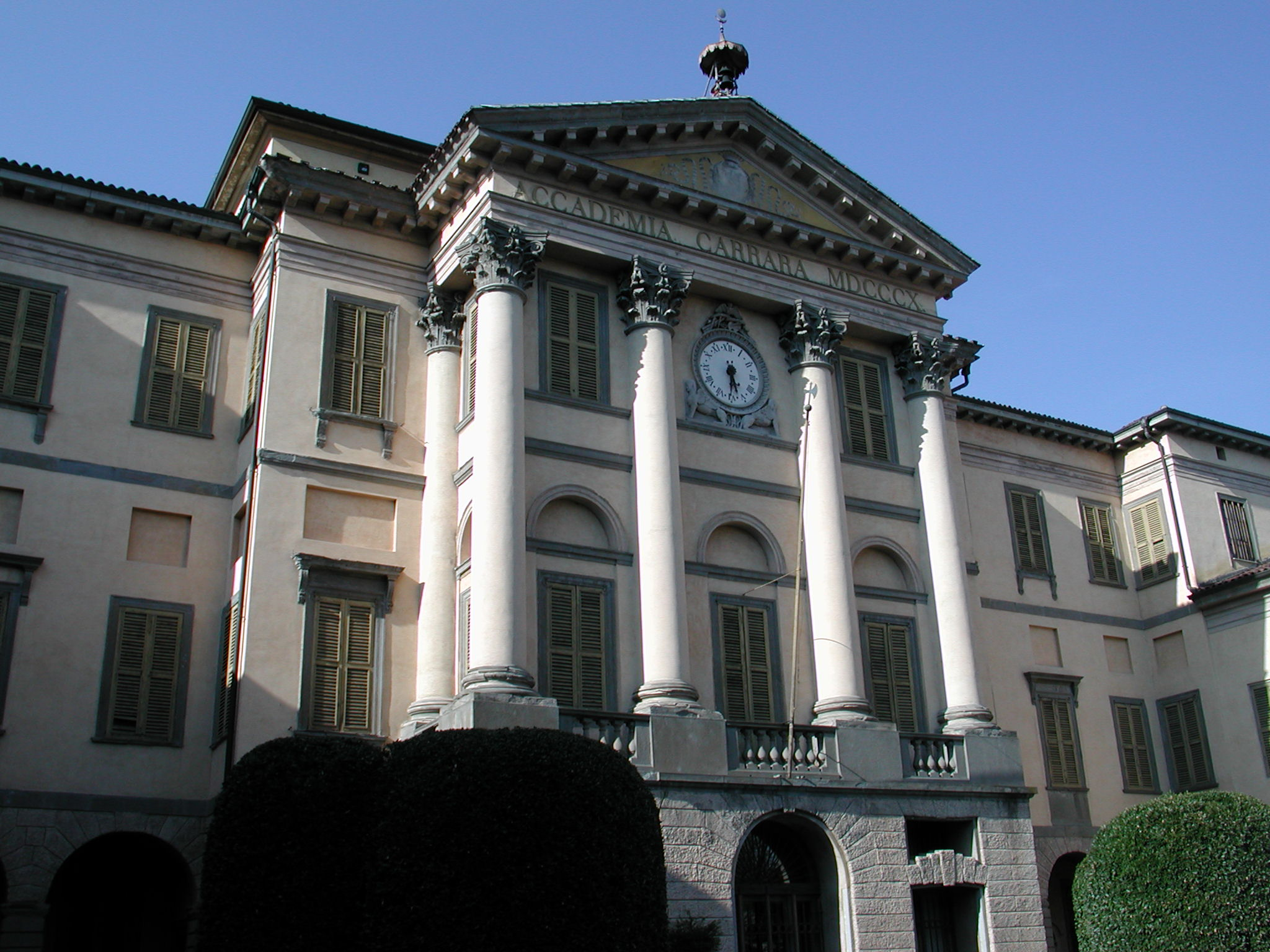
The Accademia Carrara in Bergamo

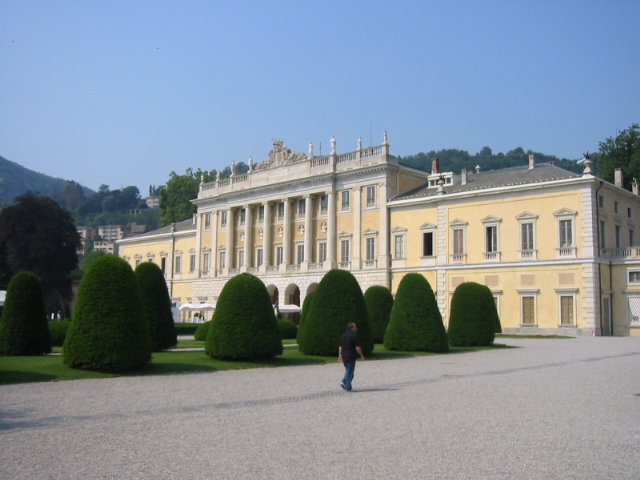
The Neoclassical Villa Olmo in Como

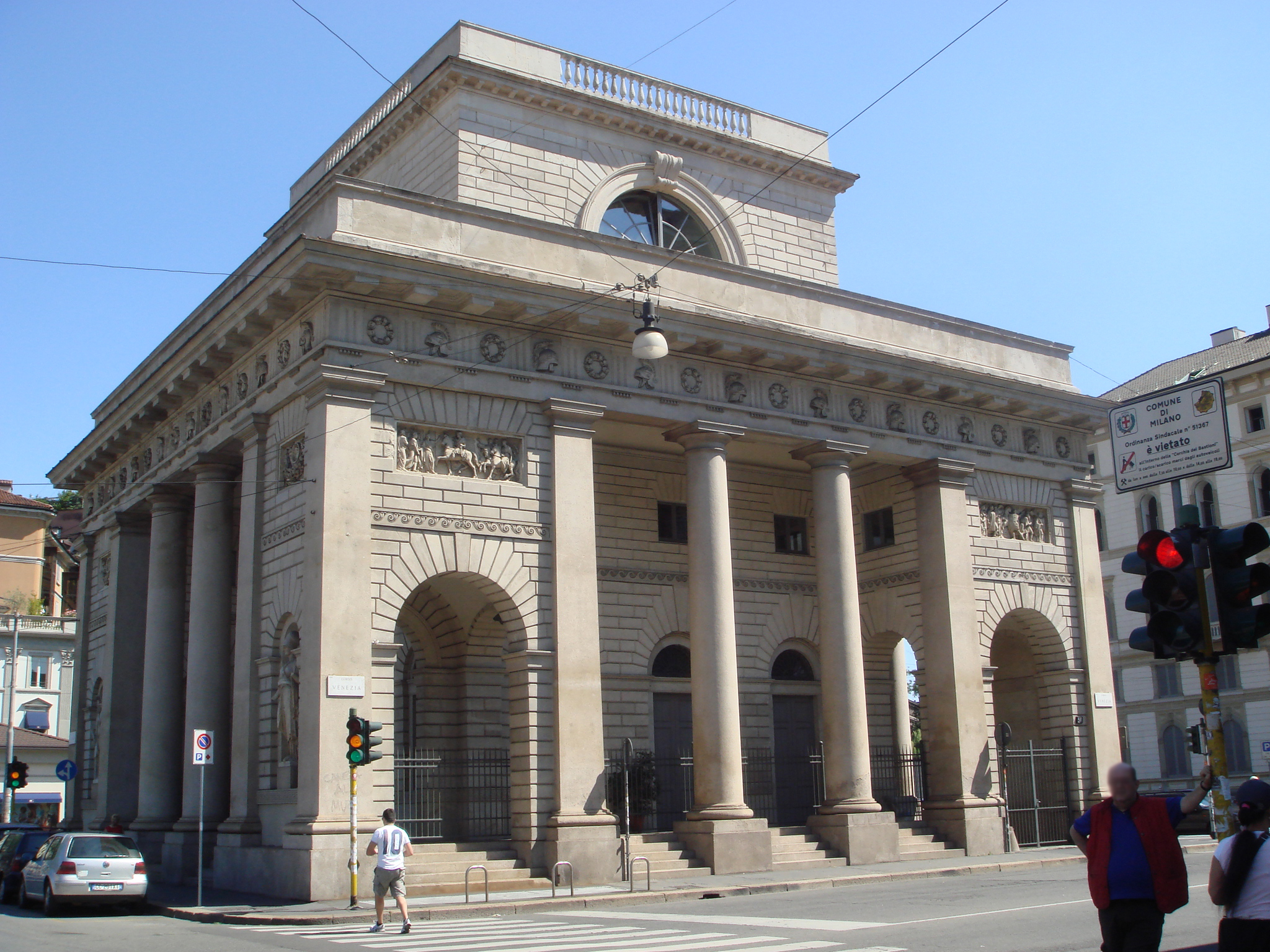
One of the Porta Venezia booths in Milan, sandwiched between Corso Venezia and Corso Buenos Aires

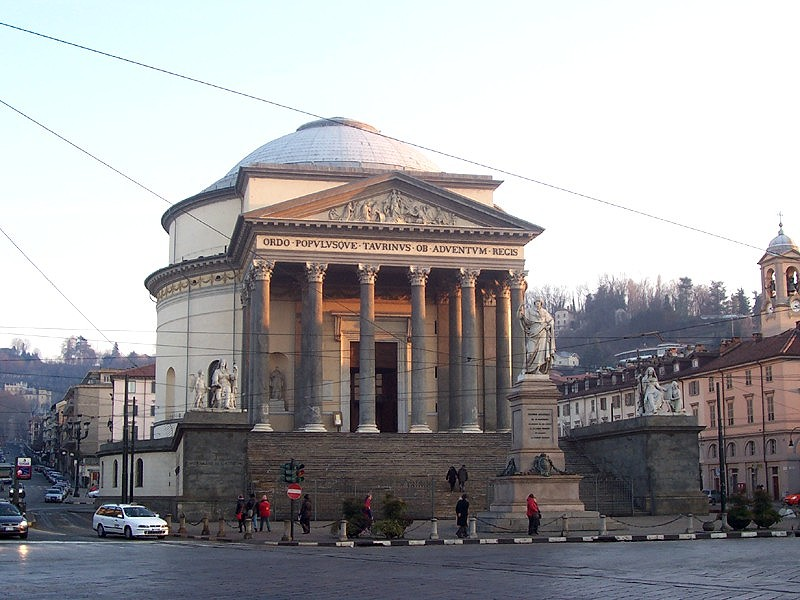
The Gran Madre di Dio, Turin

== See also ==
- Neoclassical architecture in Milan
