= Teatro Sociale, Como =

Teatro Sociale is a theatre in Como, designed by architect Giuseppe Cusi following a decision by the local nobility that a new one was needed to replace the existing 1764/65 building which was regarded as outdated. The site of the ruined medieval castle, Torre Rotonda, was the chosen location and the Società dei Palchettisti was created by membership subscriptions to fund its creation.

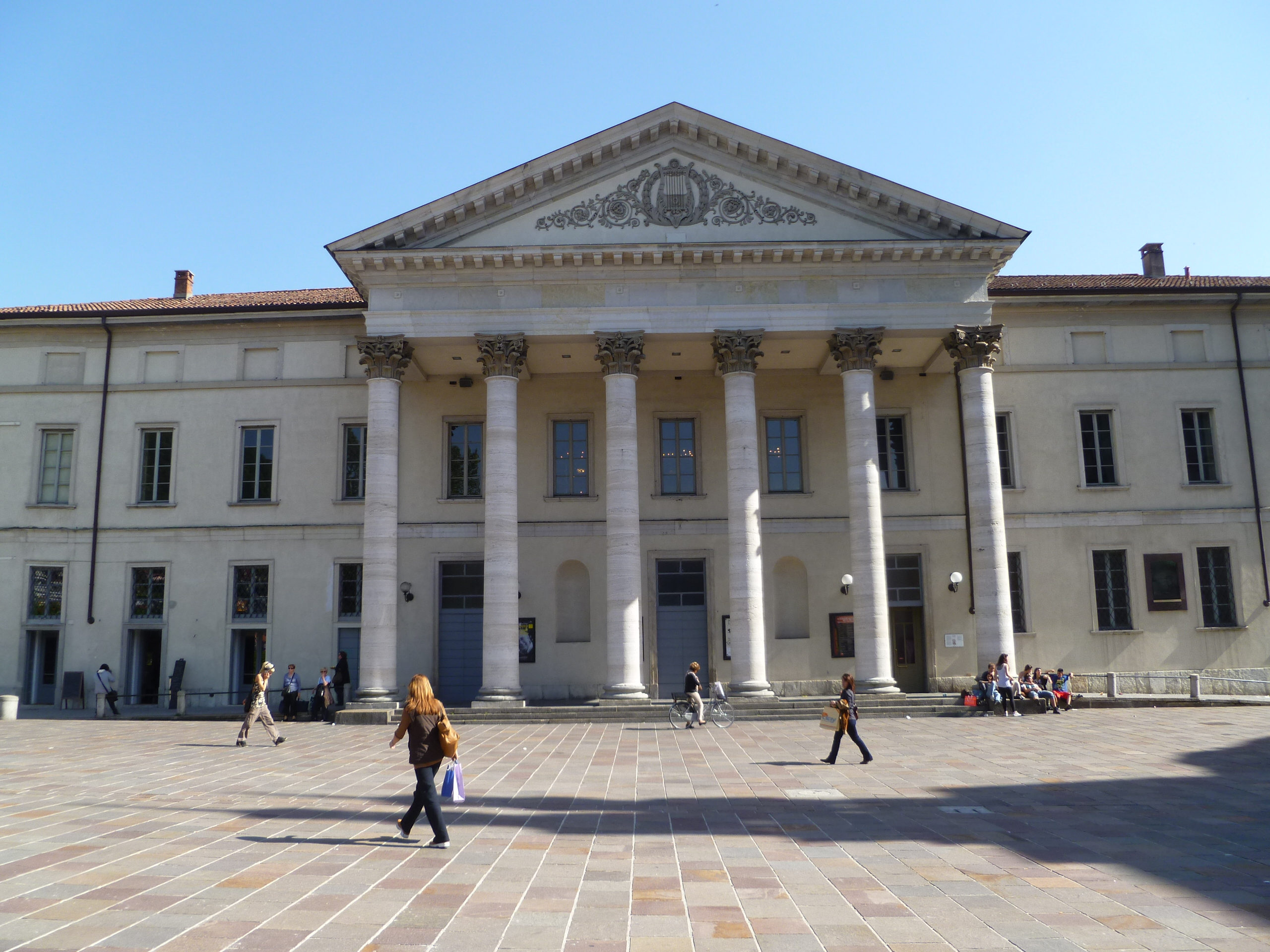
Teatro Sociale

With its planned neo-classic façade, construction started in early 1812 and, in spite of agreement for it to be finished that same year, construction problems ensued, largely the result of a bad winter. The following Spring brought additional problems and added work so that the theatre was not finished until its August 1813 inauguration with a performance of Marco Portogallo's opera, Adriano in Siria.

By 1854 it had become apparent that the theatre was too small, and additional work was done to create thirty-eight new boxes for a total of 98. The house was re-opened in December 1855.

Among the performers who appeared during the 19th and early 20th century were Paganini, Giuditta Pasta, and Francesco Tamagno. By the early 20th century, the theatre was again determined to be too small to accommodate all who wished to attend and various proposals were put forward, culminating in the decision to retain the Sociale as it was and build a new house, which was inaugurated in September 1910.

The 1930s brought economic problems, causing the theatre to be turned into a cinema for a while. However, in 1944 it became the alternative opera house for Milan's La Scala when it was damaged during the war. The postwar period saw difficulties and its closing for a time in the 1960s. However, it closed down again in May 1984 when the Società dei Palchettisti had decided "to close the theatre for an undetermined time because of the instability of the structure". After delays and indecisions, a major remodeling took place, creating a 900-seat house with five tiers and "a massive, six-Corinthian-column pronaos (which) anchors the monumental neo-classical facade of the structure.
