= Garibaldi Museum =

Garibaldi Museum may refer to:

- Garibaldi Museum (Como), a museum dedicated to Giuseppe Garibaldi in Como, Italy
- Garibaldi Museum (Garibaldi, Oregon), an Oregon museum focusing on Captain Robert Gray
- Garibaldi-Meucci Museum, a museum of Italian-American heritage and culture in New York
