= List of people from Como =

The following is a list of notable people who were born in Como, Italy.

- Pliny the Elder (Gaius Plinius Secundus; 23–79 CE), author, natural philosopher and naval and military commander known for the Naturalis Historia
- Caecilius (c. 59 CE), a poet, the subject of Catullus's Carmina 35, who had a girlfriend more learned than the Sapphic Muse
- Pliny the Younger (Gaius Plinius Caecilius Secundus; 63–c.113 CE), lawyer, an author and a natural philosopher of Ancient Rome
- Agostina Camozzi (1435–1458), Roman Catholic professed religious from the Order of Saint Augustine beatified by Pope Gregory XVI on 19 September 1834
- Paolo Giovio (1483–1552), physician, historian and biographer remembered as a chronicler of the Italian Wars
- Benedetto Odescalchi (1611–1689), Pope Innocent XI from 1676 until his death
- Alessandro Volta (1745–1827), physicist known for the development of the battery in 1800
- Luigi Borgomainerio (1836–1876), caricaturist
- Cosima Liszt (1837–1930), Franz Liszt's daughter and Richard Wagner's wife
- Maria Roda (1877–?), Italian American anarchist-feminist
- Giuseppe Sinigaglia (1884–1916), rower, European championship gold medalist in 1911
- Antonio Sant'Elia (1888–1916), architect
- Mario Radice (1898–1987), abstract painter
- Manlio Rho (1901–1957), abstract painter
- Carla Porta Musa (1902–2012), essayist, poet and unverified supercentenarian
- Giuseppe Terragni (1904–1943), an architect and pioneer of the Italian modern movement and rationalism
- Giorgio Perlasca (1910–1992), saved 5,218 Jews from transportation to Nazi Germany and the Holocaust
- Antonio Spallino (1925–2017), Olympic fencer and mayor of Como from 1970 to 1985
- Gabriele Oriali (born 1952), 1982 Italian national team footballer World Champion
- Corrado Passera (born 1954), manager and banker, Minister of Economic Development of the Monti Cabinet
- Stefano Casiraghi (1960–1990), World Offshore Champion and second husband of Caroline Princess of Monaco
- Remo Ruffini (born 1961), businessman, founder of fashion group Moncler
- Max Papis (born 1969), Formula One, Champ Car, and NASCAR racing driver
- Luisa Lambri (1969), artist, photographer, filmmaker
- Fabio Casartelli (1970–1995) cyclist and Olympic gold medalist
- Diego De Ascentis (born 1976), football midfielder
- Paola Tagliabue (born 1976), world champion free diver in 2006
- Gianluca Zambrotta (born 1977), international footballer and World Champion in Germany 2006
- Jennifer Isacco (born 1977), bobsledder, Olympic medalist in 2006
- Floraleda Sacchi (born 1978), harpist and musicologist
- Anna Cappellini (born 1987), ice dancer, Olympian, two times national champion, European champion and world champion in 2014
- Francesca Rio (born 1990), figure skater, junior national champion and three-time national silver medalist
- Matteo Bianchetti (born 1993), captain of the Italian national under-21 football team
- Filippo Mondelli (1994–2021), world champion rower
- Elisa Meneghini (born 1997), Olympian, artistic gymnast, gold medalist at the 2018 Doha World Cup
- Patrick Cutrone (born 1998), football striker of AC Milan
- Chituru Ali (born 1999), sprinter
