= Ospedale Valduce =

Valduce Hospital
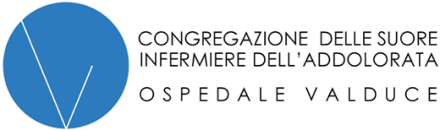

Geography
- Location: Como, Lombardy, Italy

Organisation
- Affiliated university: Congregazione delle Suore Infermiere dell’Addolorata

Services
- Beds: 360

Links
- Website: http://www.valduce.it/

The Valduce Hospital is a private hospital of the city of Como, Italy.

The hospital has been founded in 1853 and it's managed by the Congregazione delle Suore Infermiere dell’Addolorata (Congregation of the Nurse Sisters of Our Lady of Sorrows), a Roman Catholic religious institute of sisters. It's also accredited with the Lombardy Region. Being a religious healthcare facility equivalent to a public institution, it falls under the General Health Directorate of the Region.

The hospital has its main location in downtown Como (via Dante 11); another facility is Villa Beretta Rehabilitation Center, a structure dedicated to functional recovery after disabilities caused by central nervous system injuries and diseases, and a research institute in Rehabilitation Medicine (under the name Villa Beretta Research Rehabilitation Innovation Institute), both located in Costa Masnaga, in the province of Lecco.

As of 2024, Riccardo Bertoletti serves as the Medical Director of the hospital, while Franco Molteni holds dual roles as the Scientific Director of Villa Beretta Research Rehabilitation Innovation Institute and the Clinical Director of Villa Beretta Rehabilitation Center.
