= Rebbio =

District and former municipality in Como, Italy

- District and former comune
- Como - Circoscrizione n. 7 - Rebbio
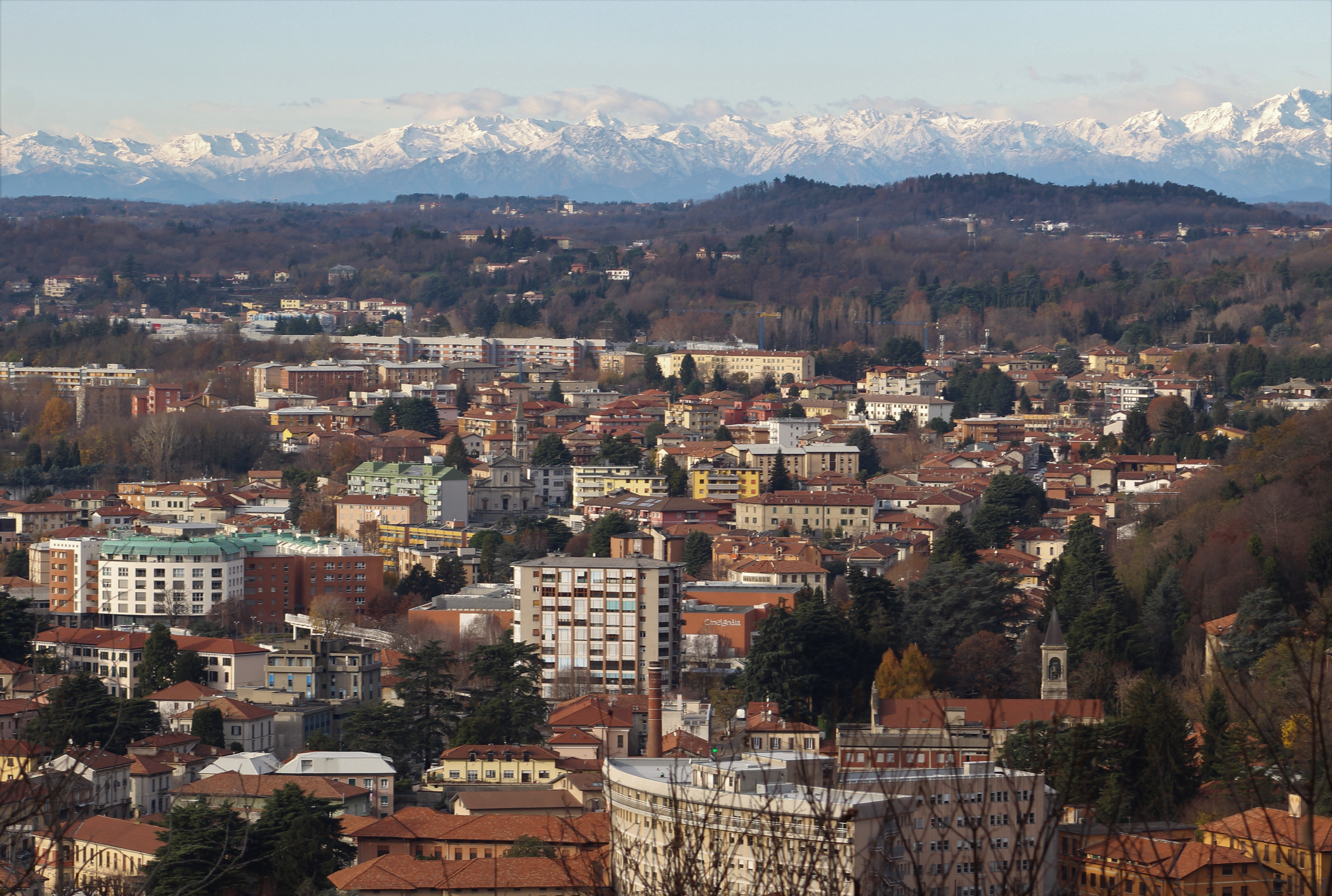
- Rebbio as seen from the south with the Alps in the background

- Location within Lombardy
- Coordinates: 45°47′15″N 9°03′30″E
- Country: Italy
- Region: Lombardy
- Province: Como
- Municipality: Como

Population Historical population figures available.
  - Total: c. 10,000 (as reported pre−2,024)
- Postal code: 22100
- Dialling code: 031

Rebbio is a southern district (circoscrizione) of the city of Como in Lombardy, Italy. Located approximately four kilometres southwest of the city centre, it lies at the foot of the hill dominated by Castel Baradello. Historically an autonomous municipality (comune) with origins tracing back to at least the 14th century, Rebbio was aggregated into the city of Como in 1927. It remains an important transit area and access point to Como from the southwest.

== History ==
The comune of Rebbio was part of the Pieve di Zezio within the Duchy of Milan throughout the early modern period. In the mid-18th century, census records listed 715 inhabitants.

During the turbulent Napoleonic era and the subsequent Austrian restoration, Rebbio underwent several administrative changes while maintaining its status as a commune. Under the Cisalpine Republic, it was initially assigned to the Cantone of Olgiate in 1797, then moved to District I of Como in 1798. This arrangement continued under the subsequent Italian Republic (1802) and the Napoleonic Kingdom of Italy (1805), where it belonged to Canton IV within District I of Como, part of the Department of Lario. The population around this time was approximately 700. A Napoleonic decree in 1809 temporarily aggregated the neighbouring commune of Albate into Rebbio, but this union was reversed with the establishment of the Austrian Kingdom of Lombardy–Venetia in 1815–1816. Under Austrian administration, Rebbio was confirmed as an autonomous commune within District I (later District VIII) of the Province of Como, with a population recorded as 1,081 in 1853.

Following the Second Italian War of Independence and the annexation of Lombardy to the Kingdom of Sardinia in 1859 (which became the Kingdom of Italy in 1861), Rebbio was included in Mandamento I of Como, within Circondario I of Como, in the province of Como. The population continued to grow, reaching 1,440 at the 1861 census, 1,881 in 1901, and 2,538 in 1921.

Rebbio's long history as an independent municipality ended in 1927. By Royal Decree No. 1497 of 4 August 1927, the communes of Rebbio, Breccia, and Camerlata were officially suppressed and aggregated into the municipality of Como, effective from 17 September 1927. Since then, Rebbio has functioned as an urban district or circoscrizione within the city administration.

== Geography ==
Rebbio is situated in the southwestern periphery of Como, bordering the districts of Breccia and Camerlata. It occupies the area at the foot of the prominent hill featuring Castel Baradello. The district is traversed by two major roads connecting Como with Varese and areas south towards Milan: the Strada Statale 35 dei Giovi and the Via Varesina, which forms part of the Strada Statale 342 Briantea.
