= Porta Torre =

- Torre di Porta Vittoria
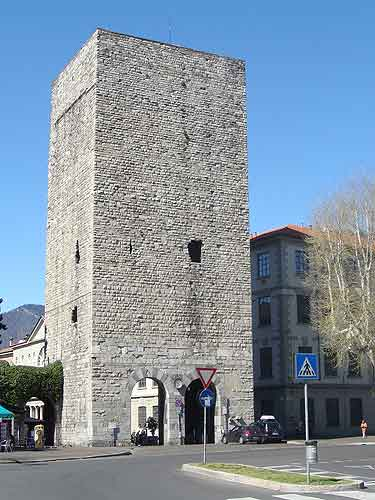
- External side of Porta Torre (in front of Piazza Vittoria)

- Location within Italy

General information
- Status: Completed
- Type: Defensive tower
- Architectural style: Romanesque military style
- Location: Como, Italy, Via Cesare Cantù, 22100, Como, Italy
- Coordinates: 45°48′23.99″N 9°05′06.7″E
- Completed: 1192
- Owner: Comune di Como

Height
- Height: 40 m.

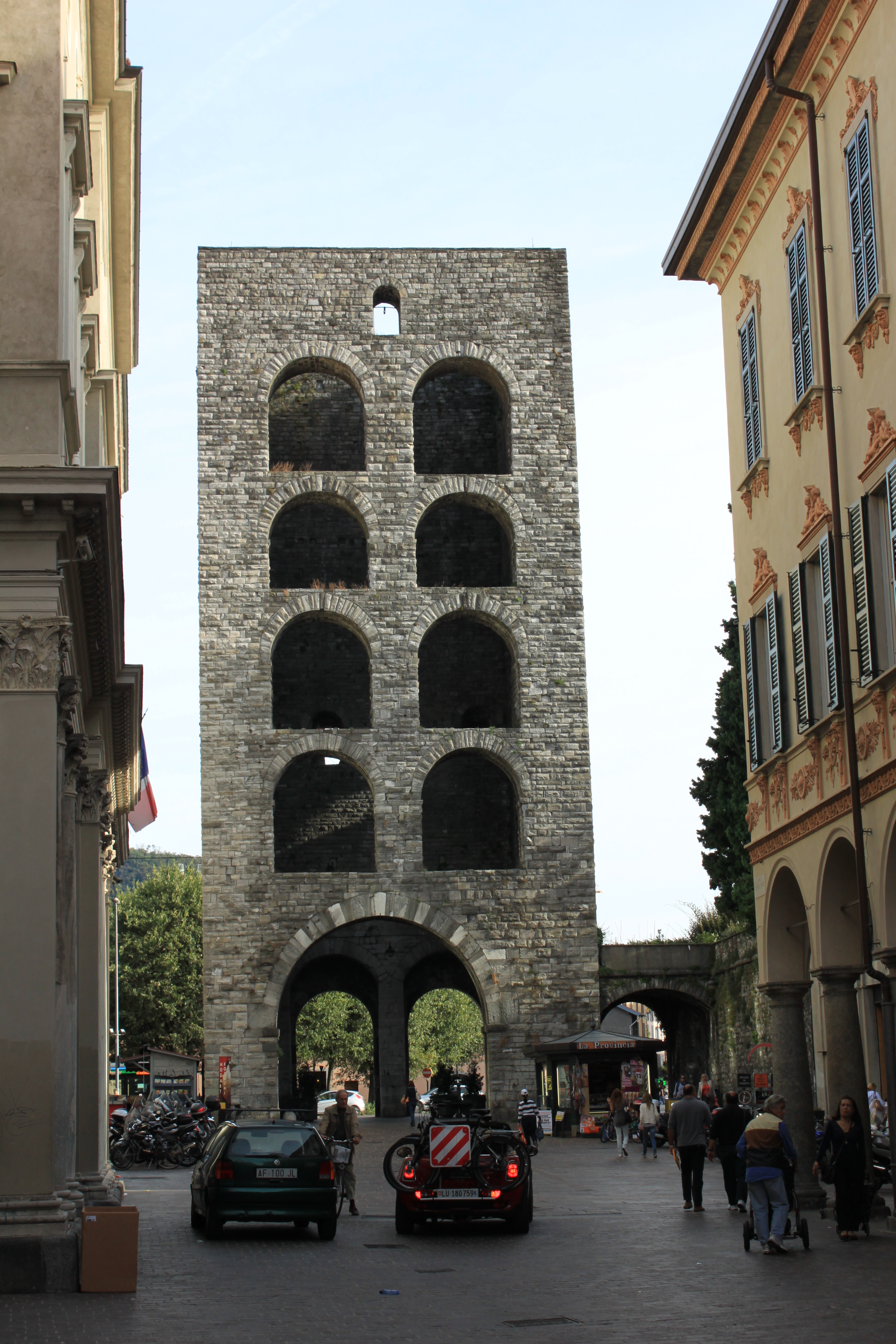
Internal side of the tower

Porta Torre (also known as Torre di Porta Vittoria) is a main fortified tower located in the town of Como, in Lombardy, northern Italy. It is 40 meters high and it was built in 1192, to defend the main entrance of the city.

== History ==
At the end of the war between Como and Milan in 1127 the Milanese, who won the conflict, tore down the ancient walls of the town, built during the Roman age. After the defeat Como decided to ally with the German Emperor Frederick I (called Barbarossa) to fight the Milanese supremacy in Lombardy. In 1154 the Emperor moved to Italy for the first time, and gave his consent to rebuild the defensive walls of Como (still visible around the town). Some years later, in 1192, the rulers of the town decided to strengthen the fortifications towards south, adding to the newly built walls three big defensive towers. The most impressive one, which assumed the role of main entrance of the town, was placed in the centre of the walls, right in front of the way to Milan, as a symbol of the independence of the town.

In the 14th century the great tower was reinforced with a small ravelin housing some overhead artillery guns and flanked by two other smaller towers of pentagonal shape, which repeated the same pattern with arches open inwards. In the sixteenth century the tower was further reinforced with a semicircular bastion, but all these buildings are no longer visible nowadays.

== Description ==
Porta Torre (which literally means Tower Gate) is one of the better preserved romanesque style military buildings in Italy. The large square-shaped fortification has two entrance arches on the external façade, but just one, wider than the external ones, on the inside. The tower has a massive appearance on the outside, while on the side facing the city is lightened by four orders of coupled arches that corresponded to the four internal floors, which were made of wood and destroyed during the years. This probably had a strategic motivation: if the enemies had managed to occupy the tower they would have been exposed to an attack from the friendly troops from the internal side of the fortification, not fully repaired like the external one. The eight arches on the upper floors are off-axis with respect to the one, much larger one, located on the ground floor.

At a short distance from the tower are the ruins of the ancient Roman walls of the town and a gate, probably dating back to the imperial era. These remains are called Porta Pretoria (literally meaning "main gate" in Latin) although, traditionally, the door with this name should be on the east side of the walls.
