= Garibaldi Museum (Como) =

- Museo storico Giuseppe Garibaldi
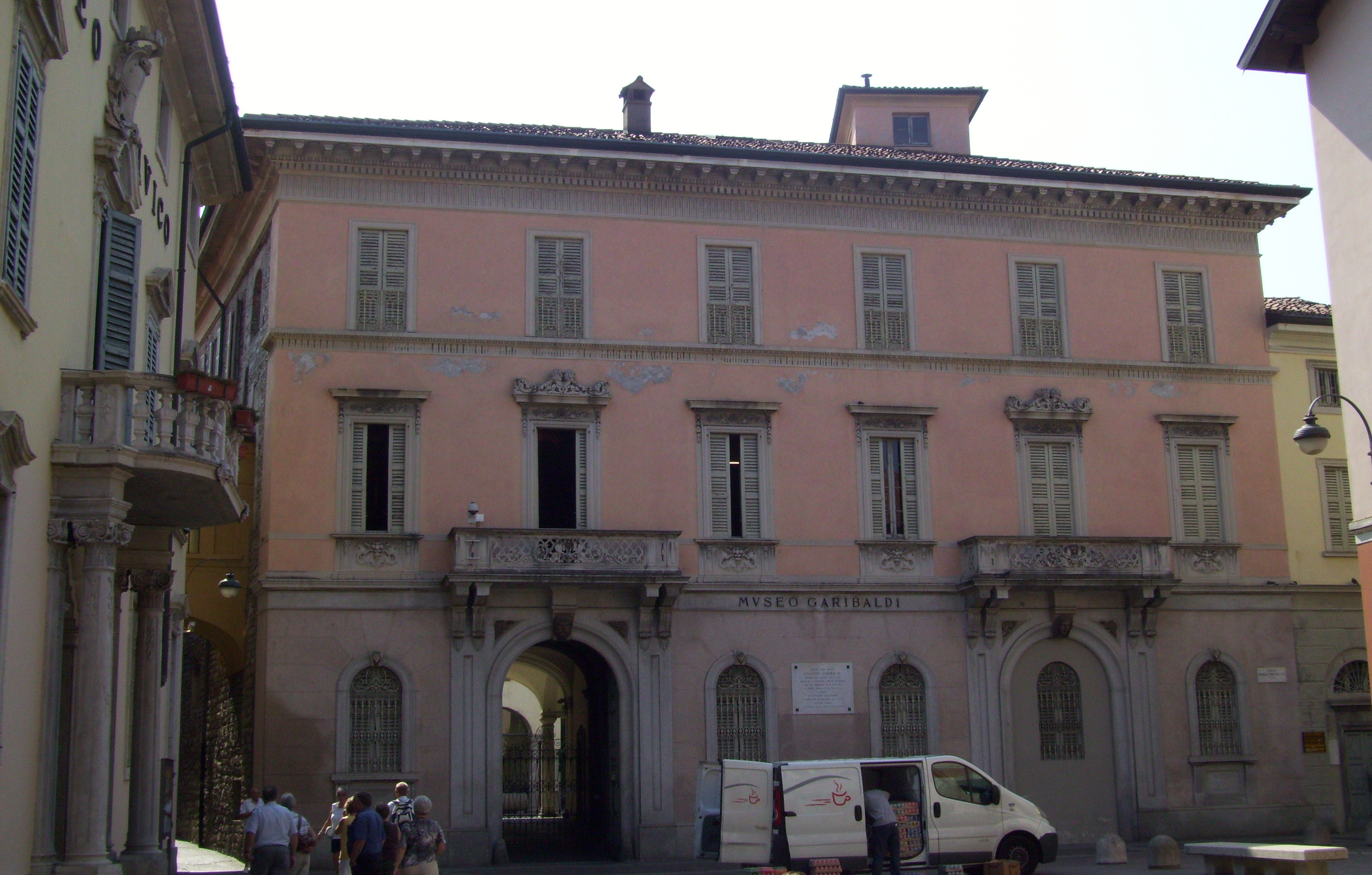
- Location: Como
- Coordinates: 45.80845°N 9.08619°E
- Type: museum

The Giuseppe Garibaldi Historical Museum (Museo storico Giuseppe Garibaldi) was established in 1932 in Como, northern Italy. It is dedicated to Giuseppe Garibaldi in memory of his activities in the city 1866, and his role in the Unification of Italy.

The museum is located at the 15th century Palazzo Olginati. The building was donated by the Olginati family to the city of Como so that a museum could be placed there. The first collection of Garibaldi items exhibited in Como was in 1884. In 1932 these items were transferred to the museum.

Items of special interest relate to the Battle of San Fermo near Como, during the Second Italian War of Independence in which the forces of the Austrian Empire were defeated by Giuseppe Garibaldi on May 27, 1859. This battle forced the Austrians to abandon Como.
