= Ospedale Sant'Anna =

Sant'Anna Hospital

Geography
- Location: San Fermo della Battaglia, Lombardy, Italy

Organisation
- Type: Teaching
- Affiliated university: University of Insubria

Services
- Beds: 651
- Speciality: General

Links
- Website: http://www.asst-lariana.it/v2/

The Sant'Anna Hospital is the main hospital of the province of Como, Italy. It is located in San Fermo della Battaglia on via Ravona.

The hospital is part of the Azienda ospedaliera Ospedale Sant'Anna di Como, which also includes:

- Ospedale Sant'Antonio Abate in Cantù
- Ospedale Erba-Renaldi in Menaggio
- Ospedale Felice Villa in Mariano Comense.

Located just outside the city of Como, close to the motorway that connects Switzerland with the Milan area, it serves a population of nearly 600,000 people.

The hospital is affiliated with the School of Medicine and Surgery of the University of Insubria.

== Bibliography ==
- Giovanni Di Capua e Giovanni Ferrari, L'Ospedale Sant'Anna di Como nella storia della città.
