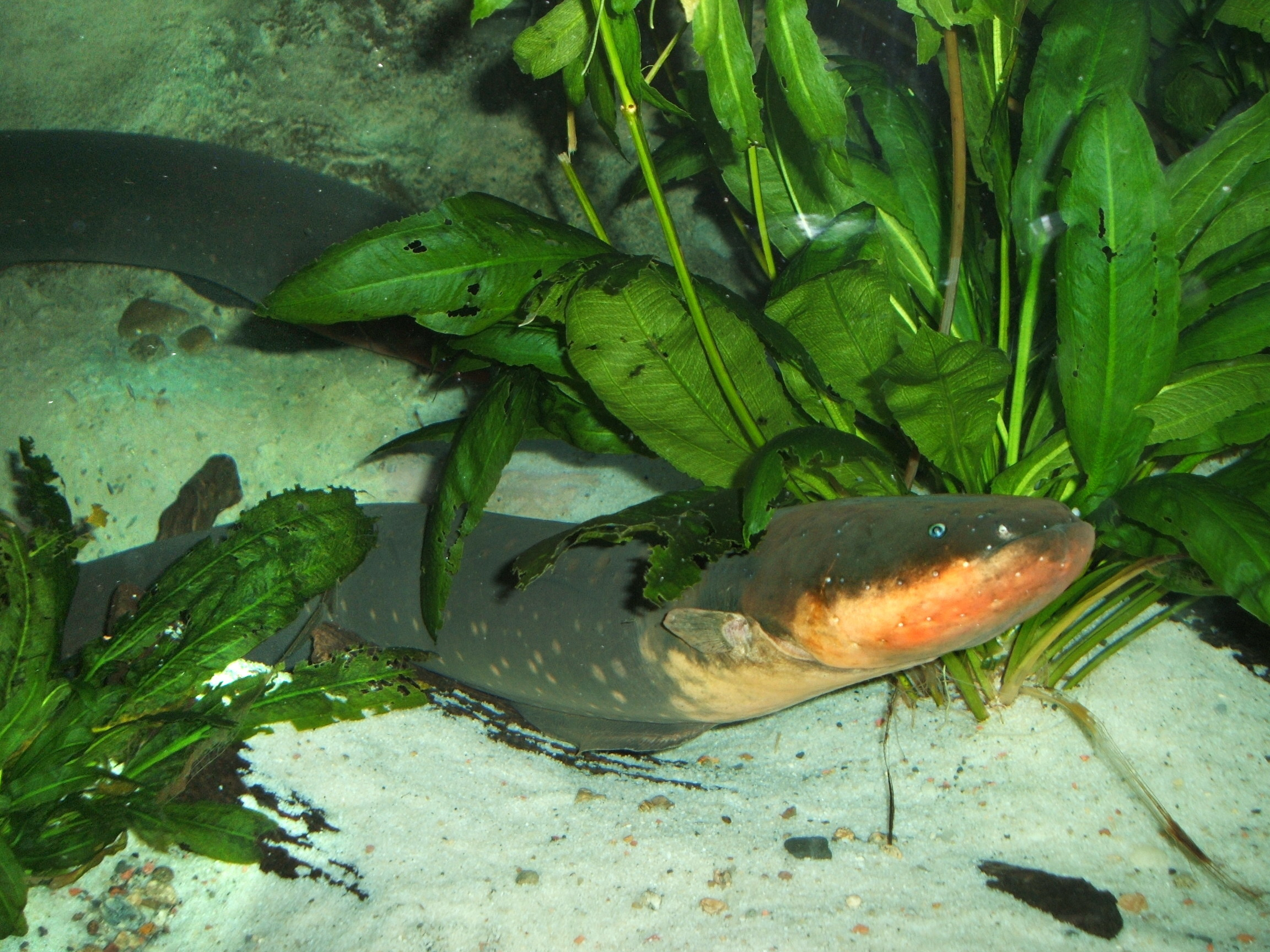
- Electrophorus electricus specimen at the New England Aquarium

Scientific classification
- Kingdom: Animalia
- Phylum: Chordata
- Class: Actinopterygii
- Division: Teleostei
- Order: Gymnotiformes
- Family: Gymnotidae
- Subfamily: Electrophorinae; Gill, 1872
- Genus: Electrophorus; Gill, 1864

Type species
- Gymnotus electricus Linnaeus, 1766

Species
- see text

= Electric eel =

Genus of fishes in South America

The electric eels (Tupí: puraké) are a genus, Electrophorus, of neotropical freshwater fish from South America in the family Gymnotidae, of which they are the only members of the subfamily Electrophorinae. They are known for their ability to stun their prey by generating electricity, delivering shocks at up to 860 volts. Their electrical capabilities were first studied in 1775, contributing to the invention of the electric battery in 1800.

Despite their name, electric eels are not closely related to the true eels (Anguilliformes) but are members of the electroreceptive knifefish order Gymnotiformes. In 2019, electric eels were split into three species: for more than two centuries before that, the genus was believed to be monotypic, containing only Electrophorus electricus.

They are nocturnal, obligate air-breathing animals, with poor vision complemented by electrolocation; they mainly eat fish. Electric eels grow for as long as they live, adding more vertebrae to their spinal column. Males are larger than females. Some captive specimens have lived for over 20 years.

== Evolution ==
=== Taxonomy ===
When electric eels were described by Carl Linnaeus in 1766, based on early field research by Europeans in South America and specimens sent back to Europe for study, he used the name Gymnotus electricus, placing it in the same genus as Gymnotus carapo (the banded knifefish). He noted that the fish is from the rivers of Surinam, that it causes painful shocks, and that it had small pits around the head. (Note: William Turton's 1806 translation of a later edition reads: "GYMNOTUS. Head with lateral opercula; 2 tentacula at the upper lip: eyes covered with the common skin: gill-membrane 5-rayed: body compressed, carinate beneath with a fin. Electricus. Blackish, without dorsal fin; caudal fin very obtuse and joined to the anal [fin]. Electrical G[ymnotus]. Inhabits various rivers of South America; 3–4 feet long; has a remarkable power of inflicting an electrical shock whenever it is touched. This may be conveyed through a stick to the person that holds it, and is so severe as to benumb the limbs of such as are exposed to it. By this power it stupifies and then seizes such smaller fish and animals as have ventured to approach it. Head sprinkled with perforated dots; body blackish with a number of small annular bands or rather wrinkles, by which it has the power of contracting and lengthening its body; nostrils 2 each side, the first large, tubular and elevated, the others small, and level with the skin; teeth small, prickly: tongue broad and with the palate warty.")

In 1864, Theodore Gill moved the electric eel to its own genus, Electrophorus. The name is from the Greek ήλεκτρον (ḗlektron 'amber, a substance able to hold static electricity'), and φέρω (phérō 'I carry'), giving the meaning 'electricity bearer'. In 1872, Gill decided that the electric eel was sufficiently distinct to have its own family, Electrophoridae. In 1998, Albert and Campos-da-Paz lumped the Electrophorus genus with the family Gymnotidae, alongside Gymnotus, as did Ferraris and colleagues in 2017.

In 2019, C. David de Santana and colleagues divided E. electricus into three species based on DNA divergence, ecology and habitat, anatomy and physiology, and electrical ability. The three species are E. electricus (now in a narrower sense than before), and the two new species E. voltai and E. varii. However, this revision did not address Electrophorus multivalvulus, which was described from the Peruvian Amazon by Nakashima in 1941. Therefore, E. varii (described from the same region) may be a junior synonym of E. multivalvulus and has been regarded as such by some biologists.

=== Phylogeny ===
Electric eels form a clade of strongly electric fishes within the order Gymnotiformes, the South American knifefishes. Electric eels are thus not closely related to the true eels (Anguilliformes). The lineage of the Electrophorus genus is estimated to have split from its sister taxon Gymnotus sometime in the Cretaceous. Most knifefishes are weakly electric, capable of active electrolocation but not of delivering shocks. Their relationships, as shown in the cladogram, were analysed by sequencing their mitochondrial DNA in 2019. Actively electrolocating fish are marked with a small yellow lightning flash. Fish able to deliver electric shocks are marked with a red lightning flash.

- Otophysi
  - Characoidei (piranhas, tetras, and allies)
  - - Gymnotiformes
      - Apteronotidae (ghost knifefishes)
      - - - Rhamphichthyoidea
            - Hypopomidae (bluntnose knifefishes)
            - Rhamphichthyidae (sand knifefishes)
          - Gymnotidae
            - Gymnotus (banded knifefishes)
            - Electrophorus (electric eels)
        - Sternopygidae (glass knifefishes)
    - Siluriformes (catfish) (Malapteruridae)

=== Species ===
There are three described species in the genus, not differing significantly in body shape or coloration:

- Electrophorus electricus (Linnaeus, 1766) This, the type species, has a U-shaped head, with a flattened skull and cleithrum.
- Electrophorus voltai de Santana, Wosiacki, Crampton, Mark H. Sabaj, Dillman, Castro e Castro, Bastos and Vari, 2019 This species is the strongest bioelectricity generator in nature, capable of 860 V. Like E. electricus, this species has a flattened skull and cleithrum but the head is more egg-shaped.
- Electrophorus varii de Santana, Wosiacki, Crampton, Mark H. Sabaj, Dillman, Mendes-Júnior and Castro e Castro, 2019 Compared to the other two species, this one has a thicker skull and cleithrum but the head shape is more variable.

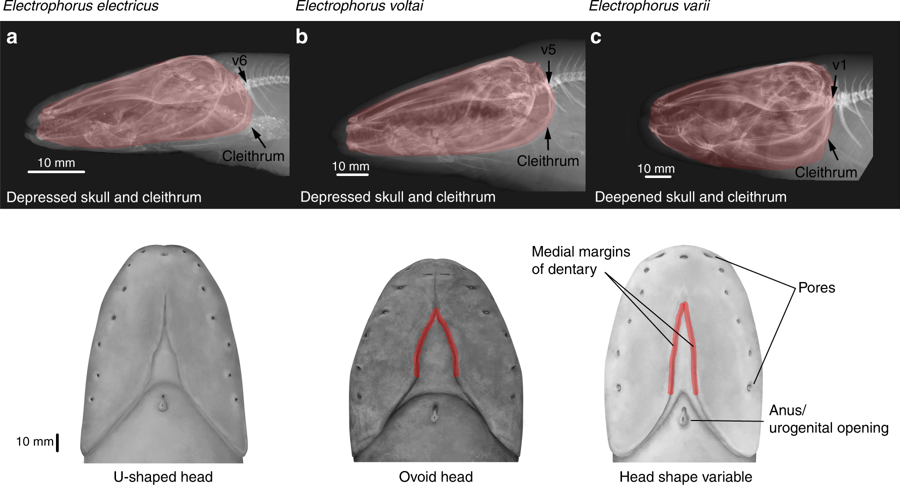
Differences between the three species of electric eel, namely E. electricus, E. voltai, and E. varii

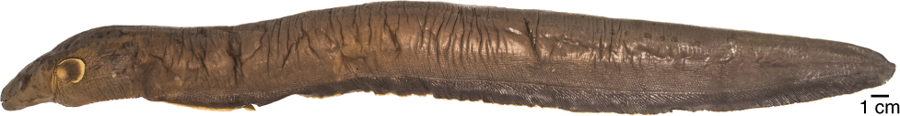
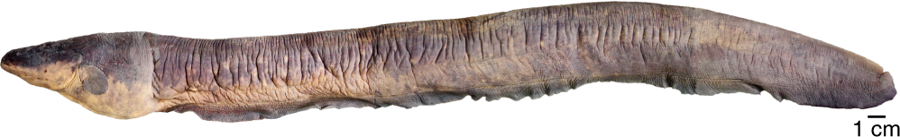
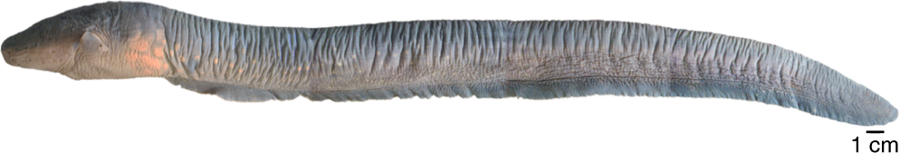
Bodies (top to bottom) of E. electricus, E. voltai, and E. varii

E. varii appears to have diverged from the other species around 7.1 mya during the late Miocene, while E. electricus and E. voltai may have split around 3.6 mya during the Pliocene.

== Ecology ==
The three species have largely non-overlapping distributions in the northern part of South America. E. electricus is northern, confined to the Guiana Shield, while E. voltai is southern, ranging from the Brazilian shield northwards; both species live in upland waters. E. varii is central, largely in the lowlands. The lowland region of E. varii is a variable environment, with habitats ranging from streams through grassland and ravines to ponds, and large changes in water level between the wet and dry seasons. All live on muddy river bottoms and sometimes swamps, favouring areas in deep shade. They can tolerate water low in oxygen as they swim to the surface to breathe air.

Electric eels are mostly nocturnal. E. voltai mainly eats fish, in particular the armoured catfish Megalechis thoracata. A specimen of E. voltai had a caecilian (a legless amphibian), Typhlonectes compressicauda, in its stomach; it is possible that this means that the species is resistant to the caecilian's toxic skin secretions. E. voltai sometimes hunts in packs; and have been observed targeting a shoal of tetras, then herding them and launching joint strikes on the closely packed fish. The other species, E. varii, is also a fish predator; it preys especially on Callichthyidae (armoured catfishes) and Cichlidae (cichlids).

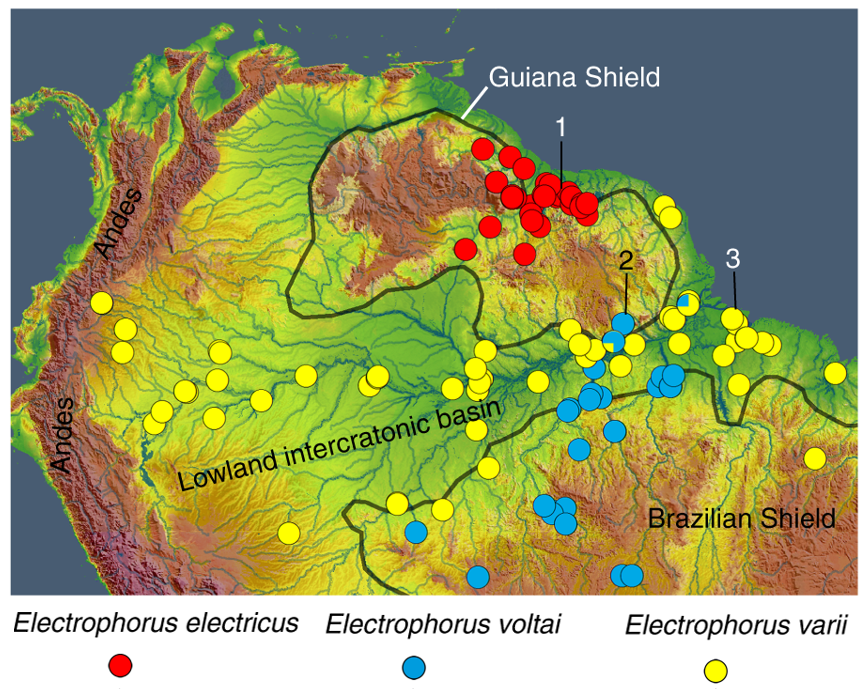
Map of the northern part of South America showing distribution of specimens of the three species of Electrophorus: E. electricus (1, red); E. voltai (2, blue); E. varii (3, yellow).

== Biology ==
=== General biology ===
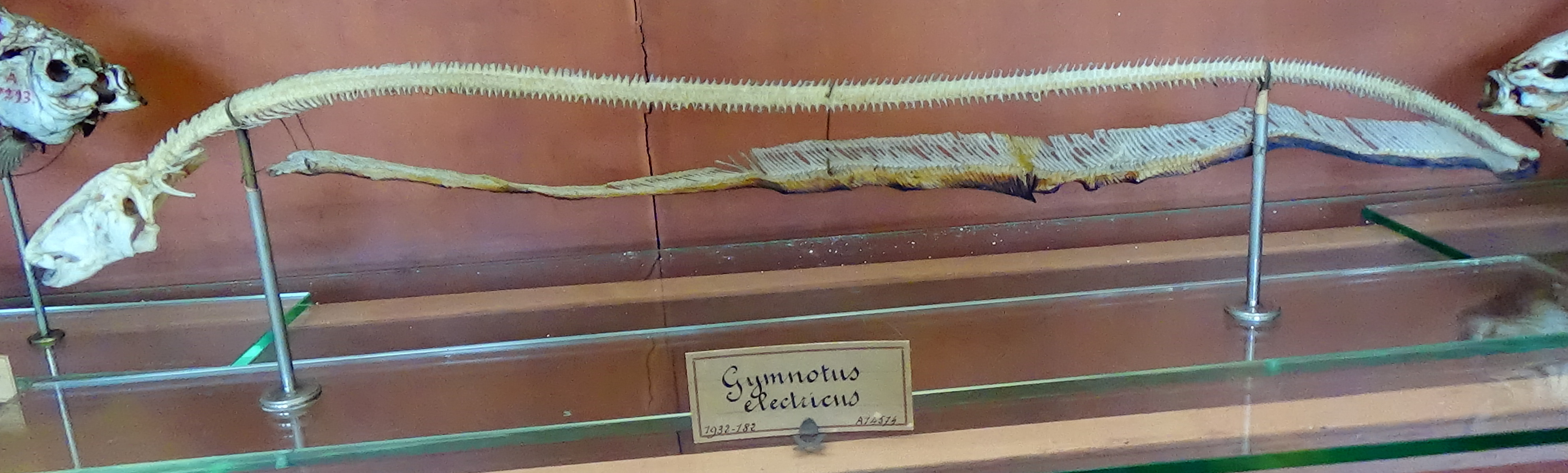
Electric eel skeleton, with the long vertebral column at top, the row of bony rays below

Electric eels have long, stout bodies, being somewhat cylindrical at the front but more flattened towards the tail end. E. electricus can reach 2 m (6 ft 7 in) in length, and 20 kg (44 lb) in weight. The mouth is at the front of the snout, and opens upwards. They have smooth, thick, brown-to-black skin with a yellow or red underbelly and no scales. The pectoral fins each possess eight tiny radial bones at the tip. They have over 100 precaudal vertebrae (excluding the tail), whereas other gymnotids have up to 51; in total, there can be as many as 300 vertebrae. There is no clear boundary between the tail fin and the anal fin, which extends much of the length of the body on the underside and has over 400 bony rays. Electric eels rely on the wave-like movements of their elongated anal fin to propel themselves through the water.

Electric eels get most of their oxygen by breathing air using buccal pumping. This enables them to live in habitats with widely varying oxygen levels, including streams, swamps, and pools. Uniquely among the gymnotids, the buccal cavity is lined with a frilled mucosa which has a rich blood supply, enabling gas exchange between the air and the blood. About every two minutes, the fish takes in air through the mouth, holds it in the buccal cavity, and expels it through the opercular openings at the sides of the head. Unlike in other air-breathing fish, the tiny gills of electric eels do not ventilate when taking in air. The majority of carbon dioxide produced is expelled through the skin. These fish can survive on land for some hours if their skin is wet enough.

Electric eels have small eyes and poor vision. They are capable of hearing via a Weberian apparatus, which consists of tiny bones connecting the inner ear to the swim bladder. All of the vital organs are packed near the front of the animal, taking up only 20% of space and sequestered from the electric organs.

=== Electrophysiology ===
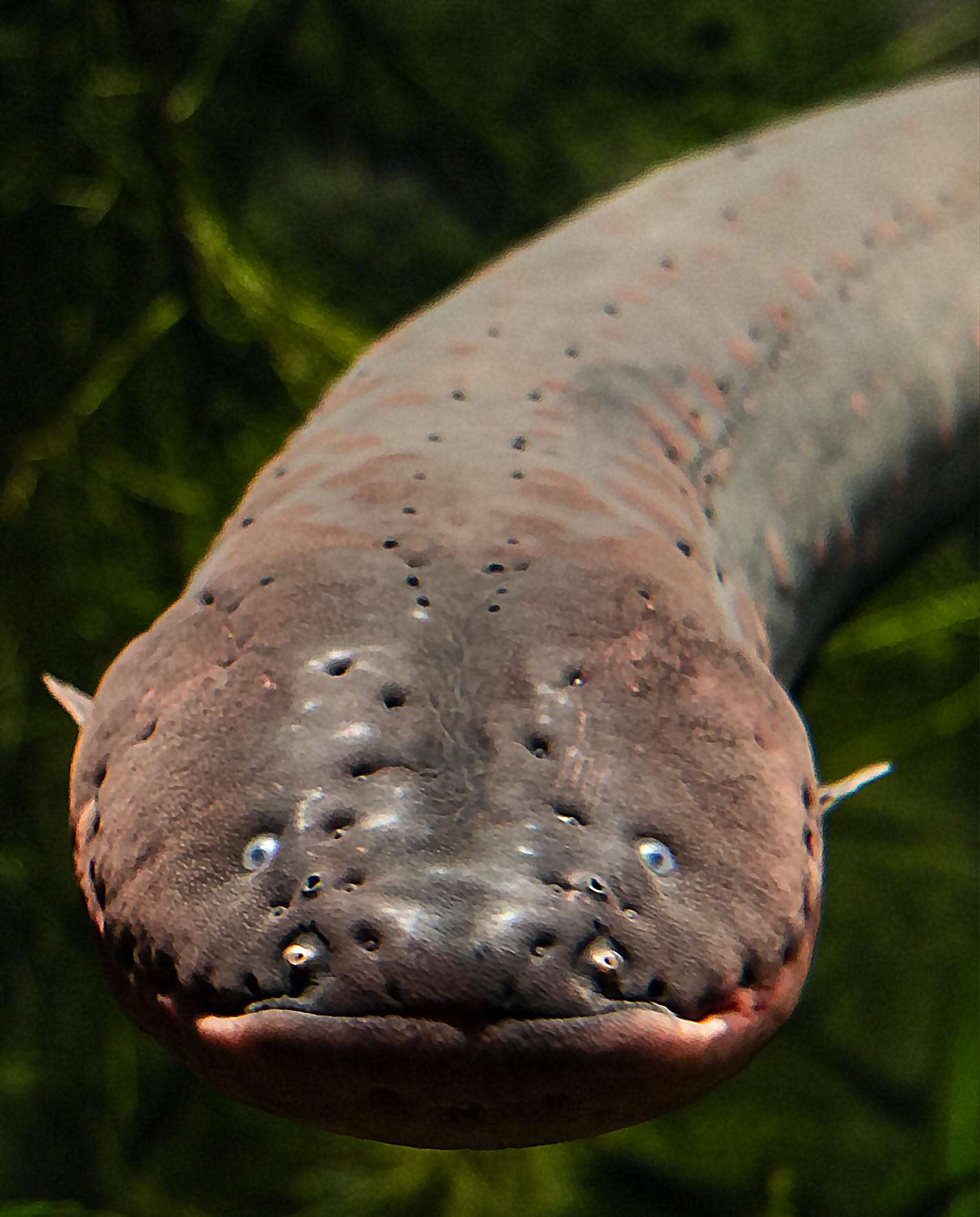
Lateral line pits in rows on the top and sides of the head and body. The pits contain both electroreceptors and mechanoreceptors.

Electric eels can locate their prey using electroreceptors derived from the lateral line organ in the head. The lateral line itself is mechanosensory, enabling them to sense water movements created by animals nearby. The lateral line canals are beneath the skin, but their position is visible as lines of pits on the head. Electric eels use their high frequency-sensitive tuberous receptors, distributed in patches over the body, for hunting other knifefish.

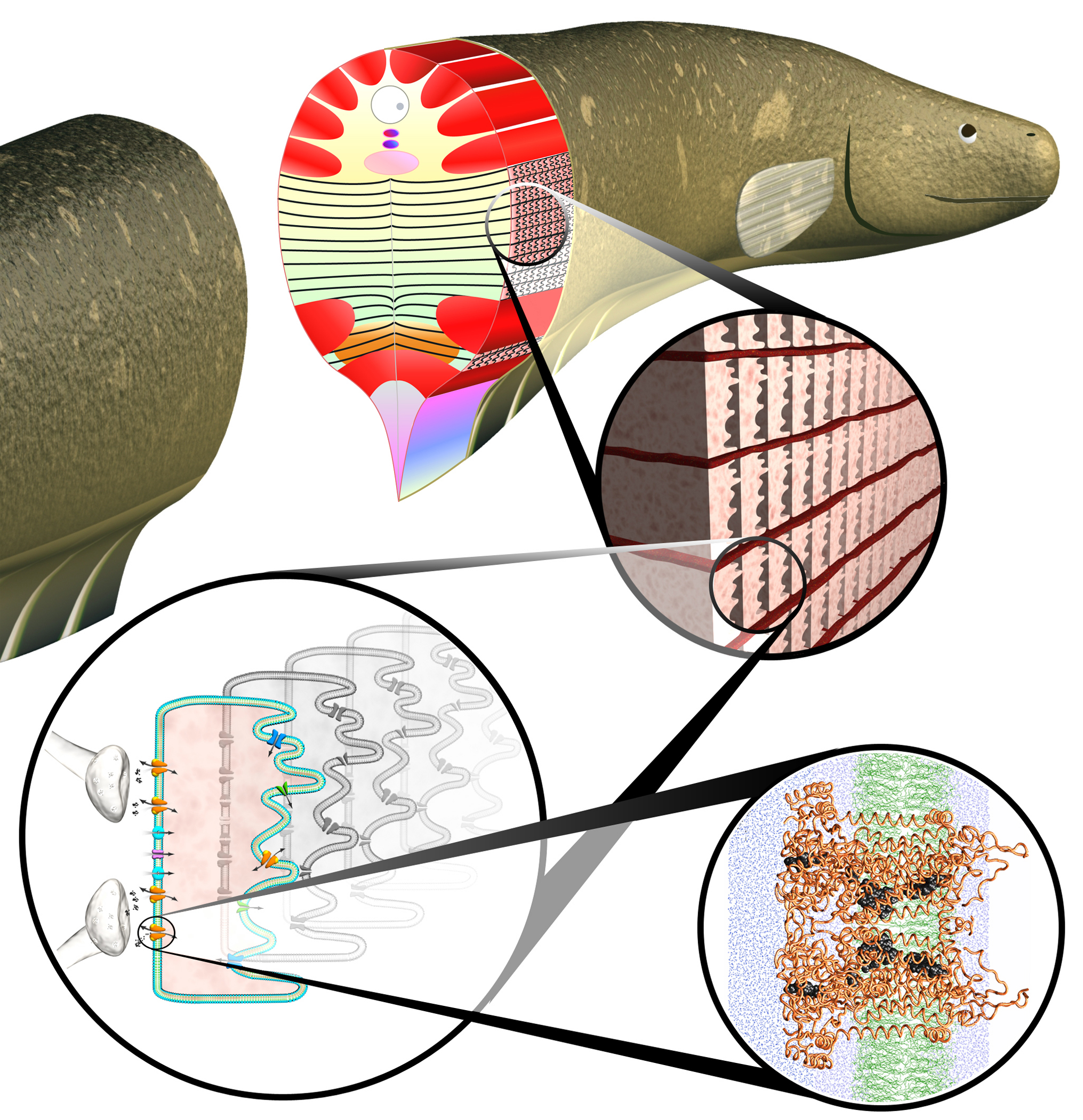
Electric eel anatomy: first detail shows stacks of electrocytes forming electric organs. Second detail shows an individual cell with ion channels and pumps through the cell membrane; A nerve cell's terminal buttons are releasing neurotransmitters to trigger electrical activity. Final detail shows coiled protein chains of an ion channel.

Electric eels have three pairs of electric organs, arranged longitudinally: the main organ, Hunter's organ, and Sachs' organ. These organs enable electric eels to generate two types of electric organ discharge: low- and high-voltage. The organs are made of electrocytes, modified from muscle cells. Like muscle cells, the electric eel's electrocytes contain the proteins actin and desmin, but where muscle cell proteins form a dense structure of parallel fibrils, in electrocytes they form a loose network. Five different forms of desmin occur in electrocytes, compared to two or three in muscle, but its function in electrocytes remained unknown as of 2017.

Potassium channel proteins involved in electric organ discharge, including KCNA1, KCNH6, and KCNJ12, are distributed differently among the three electric organs: most such proteins are most abundant in the main organ and least abundant in Sachs's organ, but KCNH6 is most abundant in Sachs's organ. The main organ and Hunter's organ are rich in the protein calmodulin, involved in controlling calcium ion levels. Calmodulin and calcium help to regulate the voltage-gated sodium channels that create the electrical discharge. These organs are also rich in sodium potassium ATPase, an ion pump used to create a potential difference across cell membranes.

The maximum discharge from the main organ is at least 600 volts, making electric eels the most powerful of all electric fishes. Freshwater fishes like the electric eel require a high voltage to give a strong shock because freshwater has high resistance; powerful marine electric fishes like the torpedo ray give a shock at much lower voltage but a far higher current. The electric eel produces its strong discharge extremely rapidly, at a rate of as much as 500 Hertz, meaning that each shock lasts only about two milliseconds. To generate a high voltage, an electric eel stacks some 6,000 electrocytes in series (longitudinally) in its main organ; the organ contains some 35 such stacks in parallel, on each side of the body. The ability to produce high-voltage, high-frequency pulses in addition enables the electric eel to electrolocate rapidly moving prey. The maximum electric current delivered during each pulse can reach about 1 ampere at 500V.

Impedance matching in strongly electric fishes. Since freshwater is a poor conductor, limiting the electric current, electric eels need to operate at high voltage to deliver a stunning shock. They achieve this by stacking a large number of electrocytes, each producing a small voltage, in series.

It remains unclear why electric eels have three electric organs but produce only two types of discharge: to electrolocate or to stun. In 2021, Jun Xu and colleagues stated that Hunter's organ produces a third type of discharge at a middle voltage of 38.5 to 56.5 volts. Their measurements indicate that this is produced just once, for less than 2 milliseconds, after the low-voltage discharge of Sachs's organ and before the high-voltage discharge of the main organ. They believed that this is insufficient to stimulate a response from the prey, so they suggested it may have the function of coordination within the electric eel's body, perhaps by balancing the electrical charge, but state that more research is needed.

Electric eel shocking and eating prey

When an electric eel identifies prey, its brain sends a nerve signal to the electric organ; the nerve cells involved release the neurotransmitter chemical acetylcholine to trigger an electric organ discharge. This opens ion channels, allowing sodium to flow into the electrocytes, reversing the polarity momentarily. The discharge is terminated by an outflow of potassium ions through a separate set of ion channels. By causing a sudden difference in electric potential, it generates an electric current in a manner similar to a battery, in which cells are stacked to produce a desired total voltage output. It has been suggested that Sachs' organ is used for electrolocation; its discharge is of nearly 10 volts at a frequency of around 25 Hz. The main organ, supported by Hunter's organ in some way, is used to stun prey or to deter predators; it can emit signals at rates of several hundred hertz. Electric eels can concentrate the discharge to stun prey more effectively by curling up and making contact with the prey at two points along the body. It has also been suggested that electric eels can control their prey's nervous systems and muscles via electrical pulses, keeping prey from escaping, or forcing it to move so they can locate it, but this has been disputed. In self-defence, electric eels have been observed to leap from the water to deliver electric shocks to animals that might pose a threat. The shocks from leaping electric eels are powerful enough to drive away animals as large as horses.

== Life cycle ==
Electric eels reproduce during the dry season, from September to December. During this time, male-female pairs are seen in small pools left behind after water levels drop. The male makes a nest using his saliva and the female deposits around 1,200 eggs for fertilisation. Spawn hatch seven days later and mothers keep depositing eggs periodically throughout the breeding season, making them fractional spawners. When they reach 15 mm (0.59 in), the hatched larvae consume any leftover eggs, and after they reach 9 cm (3.5 in) they begin to eat other foods. Electric eels are sexually dimorphic, males becoming reproductively active at 1.2 m (3 ft 11 in) in length and growing larger than females; females start to reproduce at a body length of around 70 cm (2 ft 4 in). The adults provide prolonged parental care lasting four months. E. electricus and E. voltai, the two upland species which live in fast-flowing rivers, appear to make less use of parental care. The male provides protection for both the young and the nest. Captive specimens have sometimes lived for over 20 years.

As the fish grow, they continually add more vertebrae to their spinal column. The main organ is the first electric organ to develop, followed by Sachs' organ and then Hunter's organ. All the electric organs are differentiated by the time the body reaches a length of 23 cm (9.1 in). Electric eels are able to produce electrical discharges when they are as small as 7 cm (2.8 in).

== Interactions with humans ==
=== Early research ===
The first written mention of the electric eel or puraké ('the one that numbs' in Tupi) is in records by the Jesuit priest Fernão Cardim in 1583. The naturalists Bertrand Bajon, a French military surgeon in French Guiana, and the Jesuit Ramón M. Termeyer in the River Plate basin, conducted early experiments on the numbing discharges of electric eels in the 1760s. In 1775, the "torpedo" (the electric ray) was studied by John Walsh; both fish were dissected by the surgeon and anatomist John Hunter. Hunter informed the Royal Society that "Gymnotus Electricus [...] appears very much like an eel [...] but it has none of the specific properties of that fish." He observed that there were "two pair of these [electric] organs, a larger [the main organ] and a smaller [Hunter's organ]; one being placed on each side", and that they occupied "perhaps [...] more than one-third of the whole animal [by volume]". He described the structure of the organs (stacks of electrocytes) as "extremely simple and regular, consisting of two parts; viz. flat partitions or septa, and cross divisions between them." He measured the electrocytes as 1/17 inch (1.5 mm) thick in the main organ, and 1/56 inch (0.45 mm) thick in Hunter's organ.

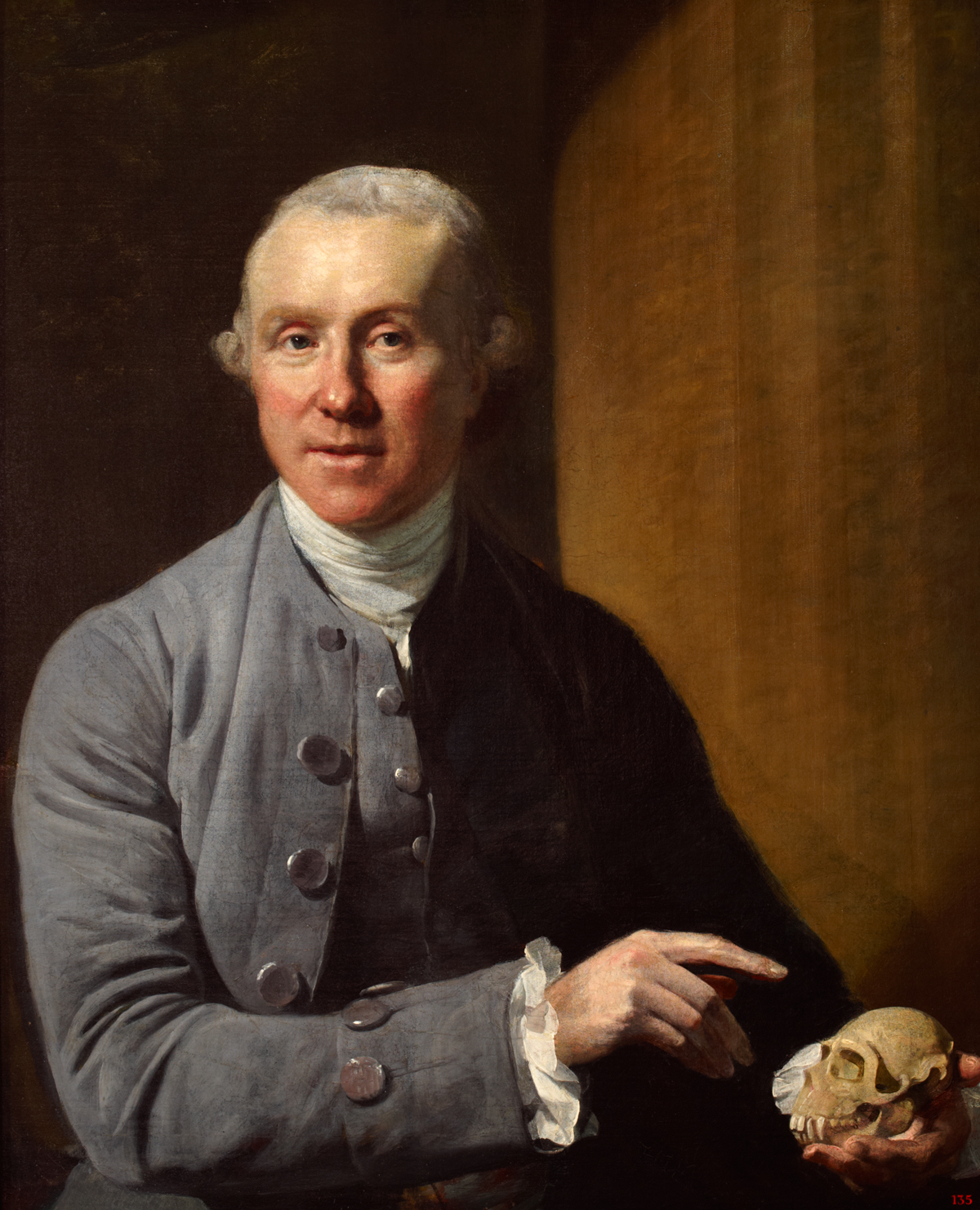
The surgeon John Hunter dissected an electric eel in 1775.

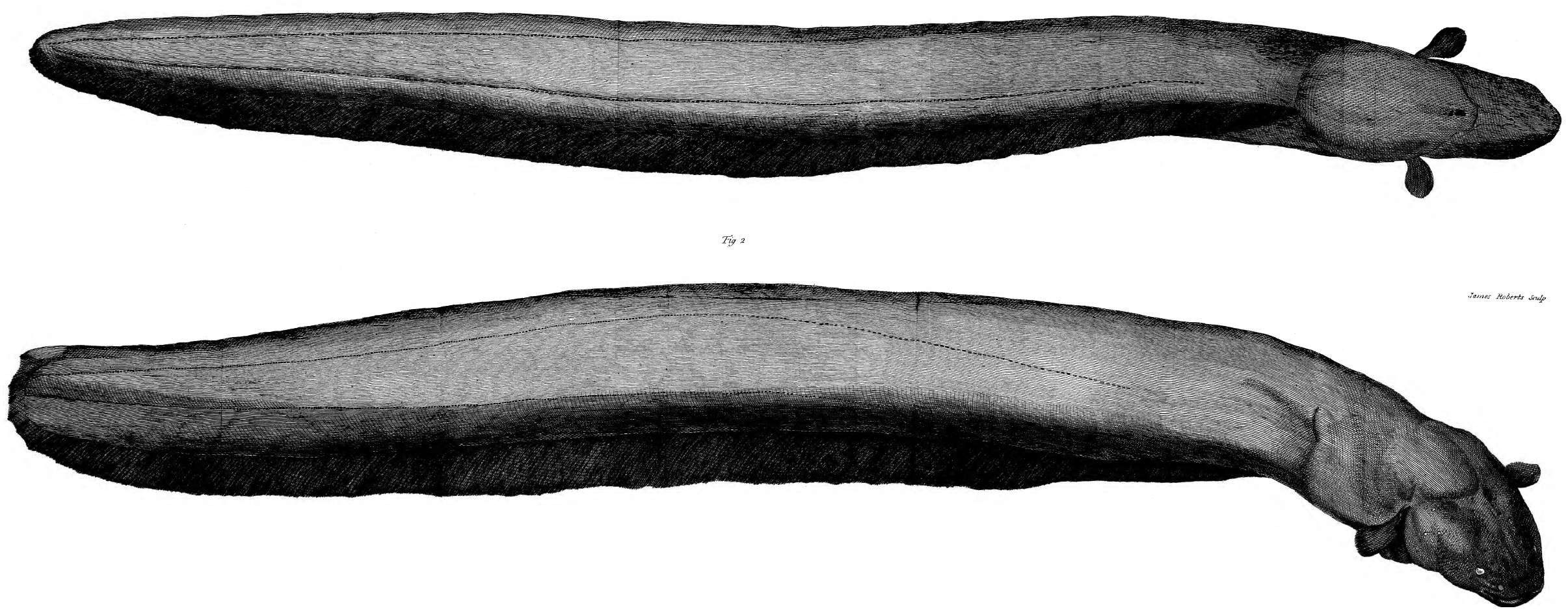
Hunter's "Gymnotus Electricus", underside and upperside, 1775.
The figure occupied four pages of his paper for the Royal Society.

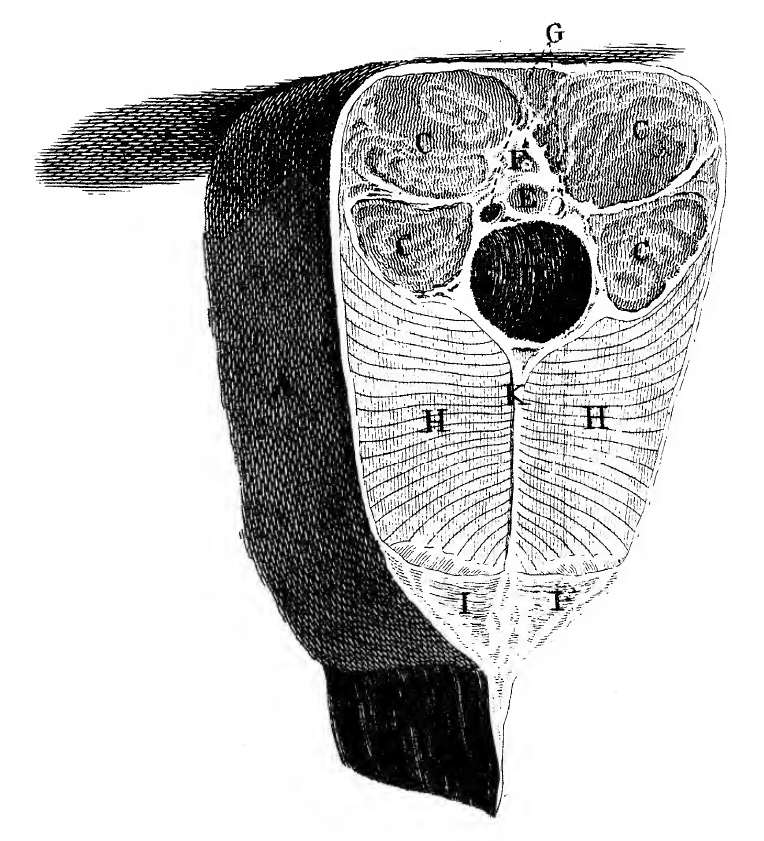
Cross-section:
C=Back muscles, H=main organ, I=Hunter's organ

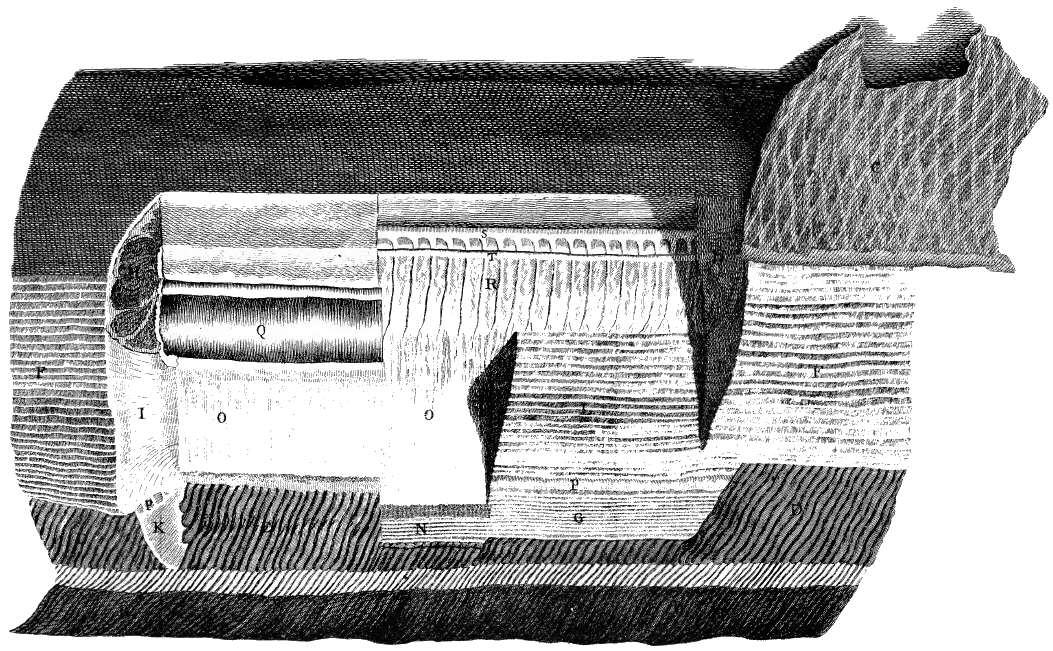
Dissection, showing the electric organs inside the body. At right, the skin is folded back to reveal the main organ above Hunter's organ.

Also in 1775, the American physician and politician Hugh Williamson, who had studied with Hunter, presented a paper "Experiments and observations on the Gymnotus Electricus, or electric eel" at the Royal Society. He reported a series of experiments, such as "7. In order to discover whether the eel killed those fish by an emission of the same [electrical] fluid with which he affected my hand when I had touched him, I put my hand into the water, at some distance from the eel; another cat-fish was thrown into the water; the eel swam up to it ... [and] gave it a shock, by which it instantly turned up its belly, and continued motionless; at that very instant I felt such a sensation in the joints of my fingers as in experiment 4." and "12. Instead of putting my hand into the water, at a distance from the eel, as in the last experiment, I touched its tail, so as not to offend it, while my assistant touched its head more roughly; we both received a severe shock."

The studies by Williamson, Walsh, and Hunter appear to have influenced the thinking of Luigi Galvani and Alessandro Volta. Galvani founded electrophysiology, with research into how electricity makes a frog's leg twitch; Volta began electrochemistry, with his invention of the electric battery.

In 1800, the explorer Alexander von Humboldt joined a group of indigenous people who went fishing with horses, some thirty of which they chased into the water. The pounding of the horses' hooves, he noted, drove the fish, up to 5 feet (1.5 m) long out of the mud and prompted them to attack, rising out of the water and using their electricity to shock the horses. He saw two horses stunned by the shocks and then drowned. The electric eels, having given many shocks, "now require long rest and plenty of nourishment to replace the loss of galvanic power they have suffered", "swam timidly to the bank of the pond", and were easily caught using small harpoons on ropes. Humboldt recorded that the people did not eat the electric organs, and that they feared the fish so much that they would not fish for them in the usual way.

In 1839, the chemist Michael Faraday extensively tested the electrical properties of an electric eel imported from Surinam. For a span of four months, he measured the electrical impulses produced by the animal by pressing shaped copper paddles and saddles against the specimen. Through this method, he determined and quantified the direction and magnitude of electric current, and proved that the animal's impulses were electrical by observing sparks and deflections on a galvanometer. He observed the electric eel increasing the shock by coiling about its prey, the prey fish "representing a diameter" across the coil. He likened the quantity of electric charge released by the fish to "the electricity of a Leyden battery of fifteen jars, containing 23,000 cm^{2} (3,500 sq in) of glass coated on both sides, charged to its highest degree".

The German zoologist Carl Sachs was sent to Latin America by the physiologist Emil du Bois-Reymond, to study the electric eel; he took with him a galvanometer and electrodes to measure the fish's electric organ discharge, and used rubber gloves to enable him to catch the fish without being shocked, to the surprise of the local people. He published his research on the fish, including his discovery of what is now called Sachs' organ, in 1877.

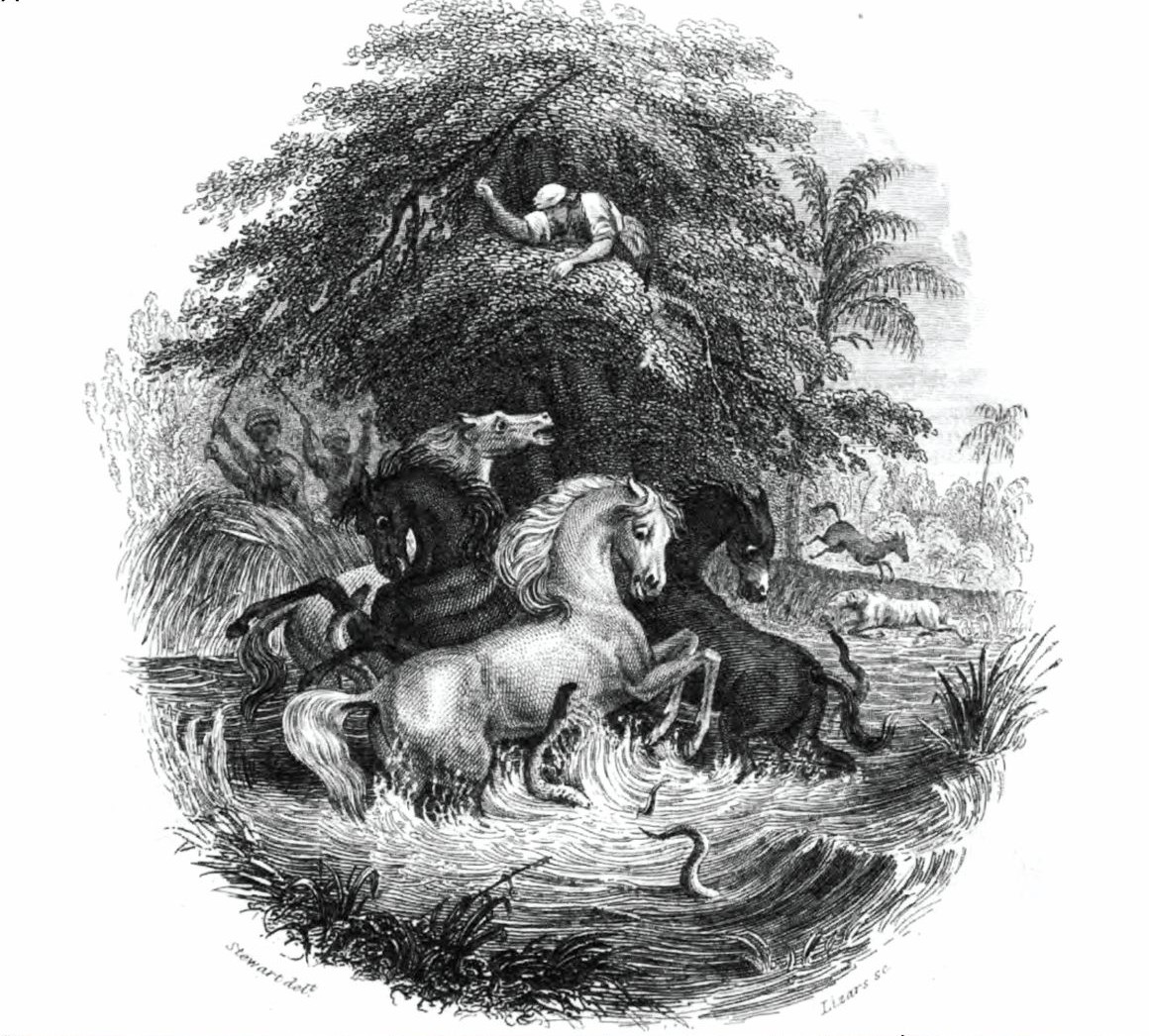
Artist's impression of Alexander von Humboldt's 1800 experience of hunting electric eels using a herd of horses, as told in his 1859 Journey to the Equinoctial Regions of the New Continent. Drawing by James Hope Stewart; engraving by William Home Lizars.

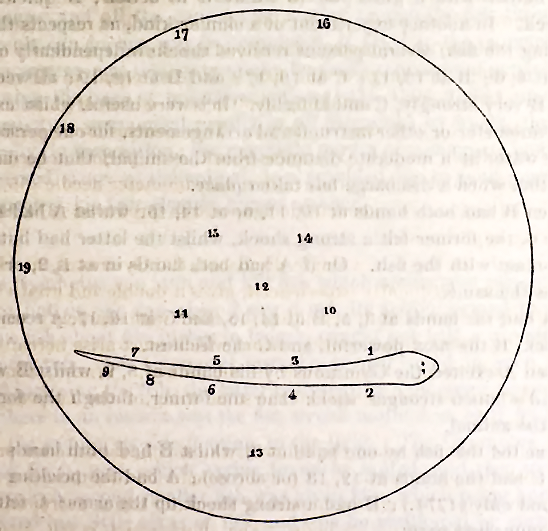
Michael Faraday's diagram of the setup for his "Experimental Researches in Electricity" on the electric eel, 1838. The fish is in a circular wooden tub in shallow water. He noted that the strongest shock was obtained when both hands or a pair of copper paddles were placed in the water, at positions 1 and 8, i.e. by the head and tail of the fish.

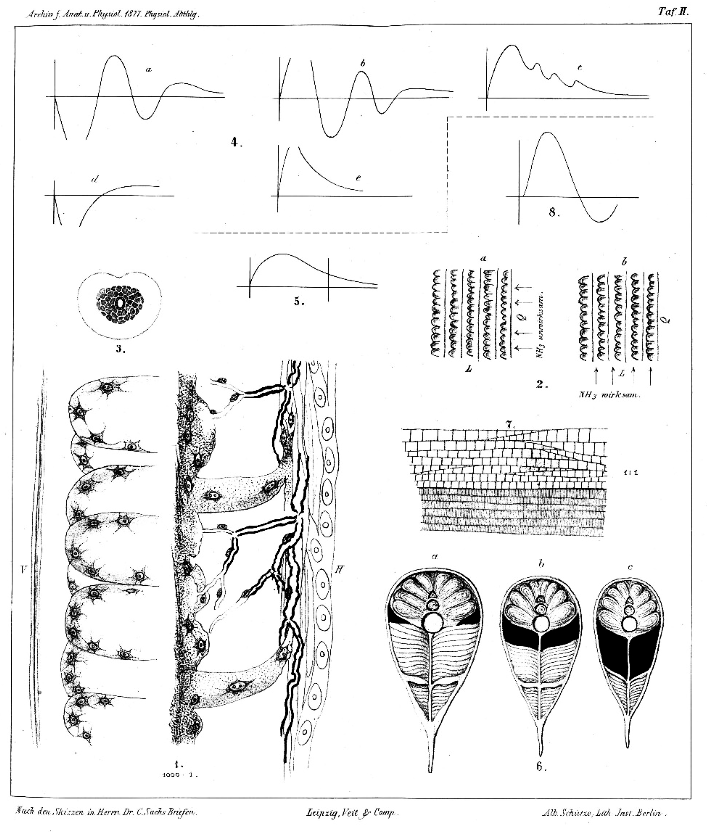
Carl Sachs's illustration of his discovery of Sachs's organ (shown in black at 6) with electric discharge patterns (4, 5, 8), 1877

=== Artificial electrocytes ===
The large quantity of electrocytes available in the electric eel enabled biologists to study the voltage-gated sodium channel in molecular detail. The channel is an important mechanism, as it serves to trigger muscle contraction in many species, but it is hard to study in muscle as it is found in extremely small amounts. In 2008, Jian Xu and David Lavan designed artificial cells that would be able to replicate the electrical behaviour of electric eel electrocytes. The artificial electrocytes would use a calculated selection of conductors at nanoscopic scale. Such cells would use ion transport as electrocytes do, with a greater output power density, and converting energy more efficiently. They suggest that such artificial electrocytes could be developed as a power source for medical implants such as retinal prostheses and other microscopic devices. They comment that the work "has mapped out changes in the system level design of the electrocyte" that could increase both energy density and energy conversion efficiency. In 2009, they made synthetic protocells which can provide about a twentieth of the energy density of a lead–acid battery, and an energy conversion efficiency of 10%.

In 2016, Hao Sun and colleagues described a family of electric eel-mimicking devices that serve as high output voltage electrochemical capacitors. These are fabricated as flexible fibres that can be woven into textiles. Sun and colleagues suggest that the storage devices could serve as power sources for products such as electric watches or light-emitting diodes.
