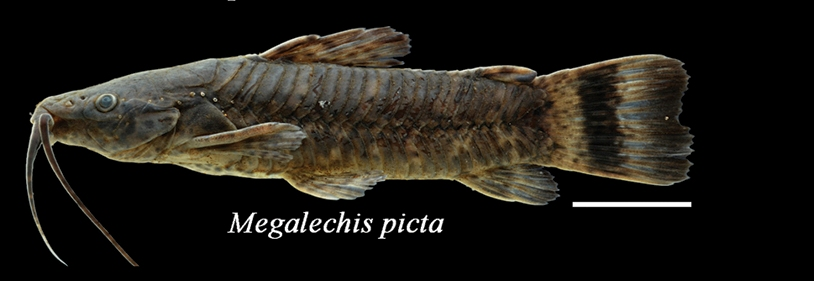

Conservation status
- Least Concern (IUCN 3.1)

Scientific classification
- Kingdom: Animalia
- Phylum: Chordata
- Class: Actinopterygii
- Order: Siluriformes
- Family: Callichthyidae
- Genus: Megalechis
- Species: M. picta

Binomial name
- Megalechis picta (J. P. Müller & Troschel, 1848)

Synonyms
- Callichthys pictus Müller & Troschel, 1848; Callichthys sulcatus Kner, 1855; Hoplosternum oronocoi Fowler, 1915

= Megalechis picta =

Species of fish

Megalechis picta, the Tail bar armored catfish, Tail bar hoplo or Spotted Hoplo, is a species of freshwater ray-finned fish belonging to the family Callichthyidae and the subfamily Callichthyinae, the armoured catfishes. M. picta occurs east of the Andes in the Amazon, Orinoco, and upper Essequibo River basins, and coastal rivers of northern Brazil.
