= Johan Wilcke =

Swedish physicist (1732–1796)

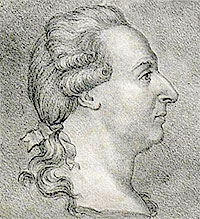
- Born: Johan Carl Wilcke; 6 September 1732; Wismar, Mecklenburg-Vorpommern
- Died: 18 April 1796 (aged 63); Stockholm, Sweden
- Occupation: Physicist

Johan Carl Wilcke (6 September 1732 – 18 April 1796) was a Swedish physicist.

== Biography ==
Wilcke was born in Wismar, son of a clergyman who in 1739 was appointed second pastor of the German Church in Stockholm. He went to the German school in Stockholm and enrolled at the University of Uppsala in 1749. He spent the years from 1751 travelling abroad and received the magister degree from the University of Rostock in 1757, after having published the dissertation De electricitatibus contrariis. In 1759 he became the first "Thamian lecturer" of experimental physics at the Royal Swedish Academy of Sciences, a position created through a donation from the wealthy merchant Sebastian Tham, and a member of the academy. He became a titular professor in 1770, and permanent secretary of the Academy of Sciences in 1784. He died in Stockholm in 1796.

His two areas of significant research were electricity and caloric theory. In 1762 he invented an electrostatic generator that was a first version of the electrophorus, a device named and popularized in 1775 by Alessandro Volta. In 1772 he calculated the latent heat of ice. In 1781, he coined the concept and term of "specific heat" (Specifica-varme), in analogy with the term "specific gravity" (Specifica-tyngd). In 1789 he was elected a Fellow of the Royal Society in London.
