= Alessandro Volta =

Italian chemist and physicist (1745–1827)

Alessandro Volta FRS
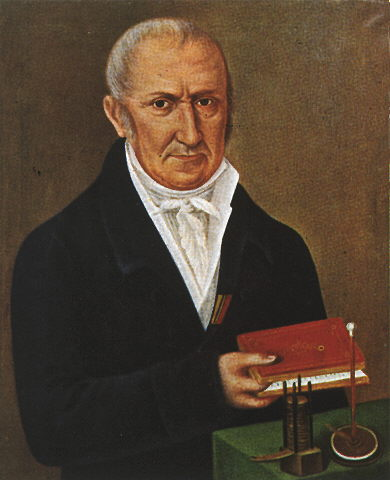
- Born: Alessandro Giuseppe Antonio Anastasio Volta; 18 February 1745; Como, Duchy of Milan
- Died: 5 March 1827 (aged 82); Como, Kingdom of Lombardy–Venetia, Austrian Empire
- Known for: Improving the electrophorus (1775); Discovering methane (1776); Inventing the voltaic pile (1799)
- Title: Professor of Experimental Physics
- Term: 1779–1819
- Spouse: Teresa Peregrini (m. 1794)
- Children: 3
- Awards: Copley Medal (1794)
- Scientific career
- Fields: Chemistry; physics
- Workplaces: University of Pavia

Alessandro Giuseppe Antonio Anastasio Volta (Note: UK: /ˈvɒltə/, US: /ˈvoʊltə/; Italian: [alesˈsandro dʒuˈzɛppe anˈtɔnjo anasˈtaːzjo ˈvɔlta]) (18 February 1745 – 5 March 1827) was an Italian chemist and physicist who was a pioneer of electricity and power, and is credited as the inventor of the electric battery and the discoverer of methane. He invented the voltaic pile in 1799, and reported the results of his experiments in a two-part letter to the president of the Royal Society in London, which was published in 1800. With this invention, Volta proved that electricity could be generated chemically and debunked the prevalent theory that electricity was generated solely by living beings. Volta's invention sparked a great amount of scientific excitement and led others to conduct similar experiments, which eventually led to the development of the field of electrochemistry.

Volta drew admiration from Napoleon Bonaparte for his invention, and was invited to the Institute of France to demonstrate his invention to the members of the institute. Throughout his life, Volta enjoyed a certain amount of closeness with the emperor who conferred upon him numerous honours. Volta held the chair of experimental physics at the University of Pavia for nearly 40 years and was widely idolised by his students. Despite his professional success, Volta was inclined towards domestic life and this was more apparent in his later years when he tended to live secluded from public life and more for the sake of his family. He died in 1827 from a series of illnesses which began in 1823. The SI unit of electric potential is named the volt in his honour.

== Early life and marriage ==
Volta was born in Como, a town in northern Italy, on 18 February 1745. His father, Filippo Volta, was of noble lineage. His mother, Donna Maddalena, came from the family of the Inzaghis. In 1794, Volta married an aristocratic lady also from Como, Teresa Peregrini, with whom he raised three sons: Zanino, Flaminio, and Luigi.

== Career ==
In 1774, he became a professor of physics at the Royal School in Como. A year later, he improved and popularised the electrophorus, a device that produced static electricity. His promotion of it was so extensive that he is often credited with its invention, even though a machine operating on the same principle was described in 1762 by the Swedish experimenter Johan Wilcke. In 1777, he travelled through Switzerland, where he befriended the physicist and mountaineer H. B. de Saussure.

In the years between 1776 and 1778, Volta studied the chemistry of gases. He researched and discovered methane after reading a paper by Benjamin Franklin of the United States on "flammable air". In November 1776, he found methane in the marshes of Angera on Lake Maggiore, and by 1778 he managed to isolate it. He devised experiments such as the ignition of methane by an electric spark in a closed vessel.

Volta also studied what we now call electrical capacitance, developing separate means to study both electrical potential difference (V) and charge (Q), and discovering that for a given object, they are proportional. This is called Volta's Law of Capacitance, and for this work, the unit of electrical potential has been named the volt.

In 1779, he became a professor of experimental physics at the University of Pavia, a chair that he occupied for almost 40 years. Volta's lectures were so crowded with students that the subsequent emperor Joseph II ordered the construction (based on a project by Leopold Pollack) of a new "physical theatre", today the "Aula Volta". Furthermore, the emperor granted Volta substantial funding to equip the physics cabinet with instruments, purchased by Volta in England and France. At the University History Museum of the University of Pavia there are 150 of them, used by Alessandro Volta.

== Volta and Galvani ==
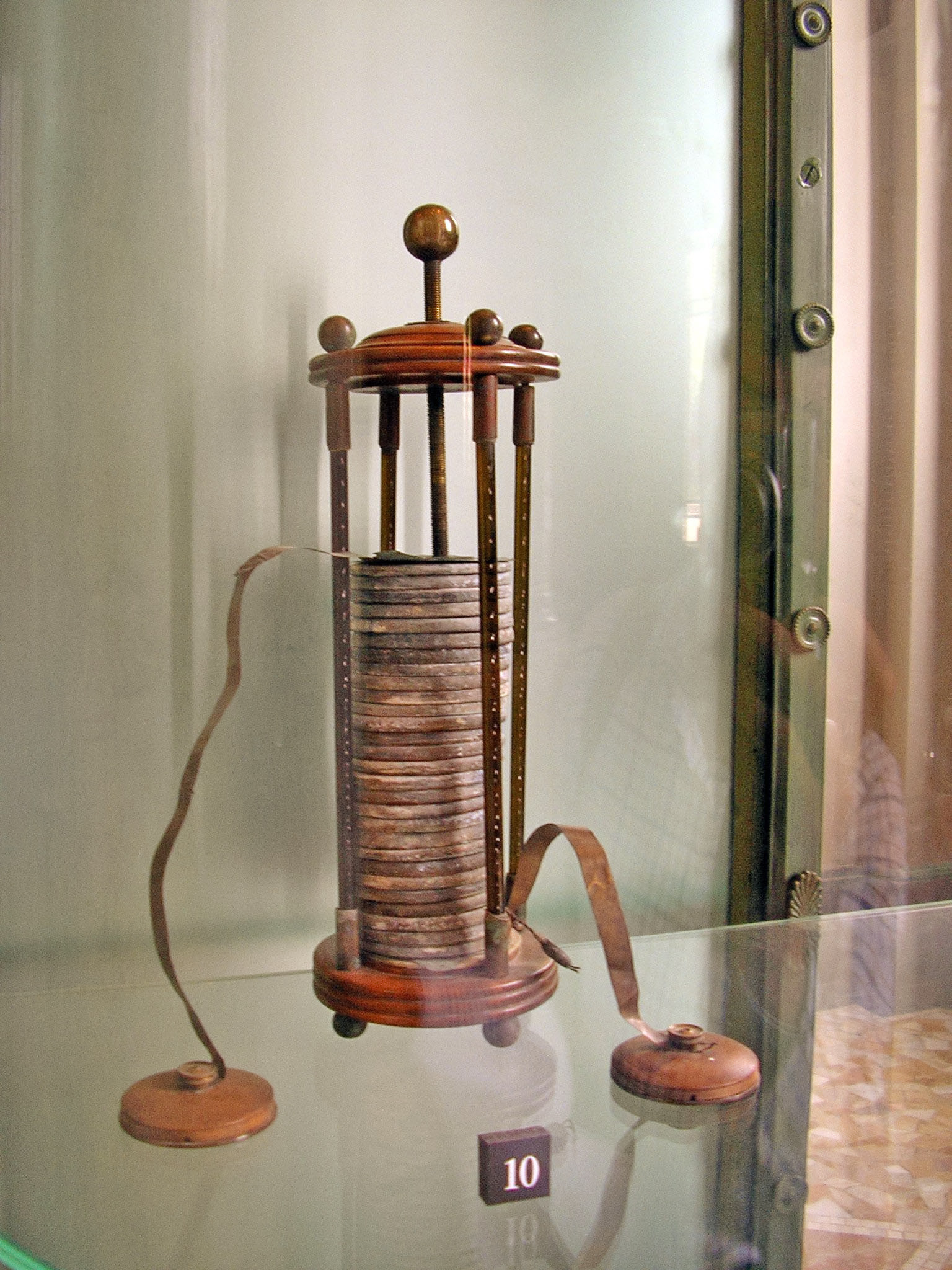
Volta battery at the Tempio Voltiano museum, Como

In 1780, Luigi Galvani, an Italian physicist, discovered something he named "animal electricity" when two different metals were connected in series with a frog's leg and to one another. Volta realised that the frog's leg served as both a conductor of electricity (what we would now call an electrolyte) and as a detector of electricity. He also understood that the frog's legs were irrelevant to the electric current, which was caused by the two differing metals. He replaced the frog's leg with brine-soaked paper and detected the flow of electricity by other means familiar to him from his previous studies. In this way, he discovered the electrochemical series, and the law that the electromotive force (emf) of a galvanic cell, consisting of a pair of metal electrodes separated by electrolyte, is the difference between their two electrode potentials (thus, two identical electrodes and a common electrolyte give zero net emf). This may be called Volta's Law of the electrochemical series.

In 1800, as the result of a professional disagreement over the galvanic response advocated by Galvani, Volta invented the voltaic pile, an early electric battery, which produced a steady electric current. Volta had determined that the most effective pair of dissimilar metals to produce electricity was zinc and copper. Initially, he experimented with individual cells in series, each cell being a wine goblet filled with brine into which the two dissimilar electrodes were dipped. The voltaic pile replaced the goblets with cardboard soaked in brine.

== Early battery ==
A voltaic pile

In announcing his invention of the voltaic pile, Volta paid tribute to the influences of William Nicholson, Tiberius Cavallo, and Abraham Bennet.

The battery made by Volta is credited as one of the first electrochemical cells. It consists of two electrodes: one made of zinc, the other of copper. The electrolyte is either sulphuric acid mixed with water or a form of saltwater brine. The electrolyte exists in the form 2 H^{+} and SO^{2−}_{4}. Zinc metal, which is higher in the electrochemical series than both copper and hydrogen, is oxidized to zinc cations (Zn^{2+}) and creates electrons that move to the copper electrode. The positively charged hydrogen ions (protons) capture electrons from the copper electrode, forming bubbles of hydrogen gas, H_{2}. This makes the zinc rod the negative electrode and the copper rod the positive electrode. Thus, there are two terminals, and an electric current will flow if they are connected. The chemical reactions in this voltaic cell are as follows:

Zinc:

Zn → Zn^{2+} + 2e^{−}

Sulphuric acid:

2H^{+} + 2e^{−} → H_{2}

Copper metal does not react, but rather it functions as a catalyst for the hydrogen-gas formation and an electrode for the electric current. The sulphate anion (SO^{2−}_{4}) does not undergo any chemical reaction either, but migrates to the zinc anode to compensate for the charge of the zinc cations formed there. However, this cell also has some disadvantages. It is unsafe to handle, since sulphuric acid, even if diluted, can be hazardous. Also, the power of the cell diminishes over time because the hydrogen gas is not released. Instead, it accumulates on the surface of the copper electrode and forms a barrier between the metal and the electrolyte solution.

== Last years and retirement ==
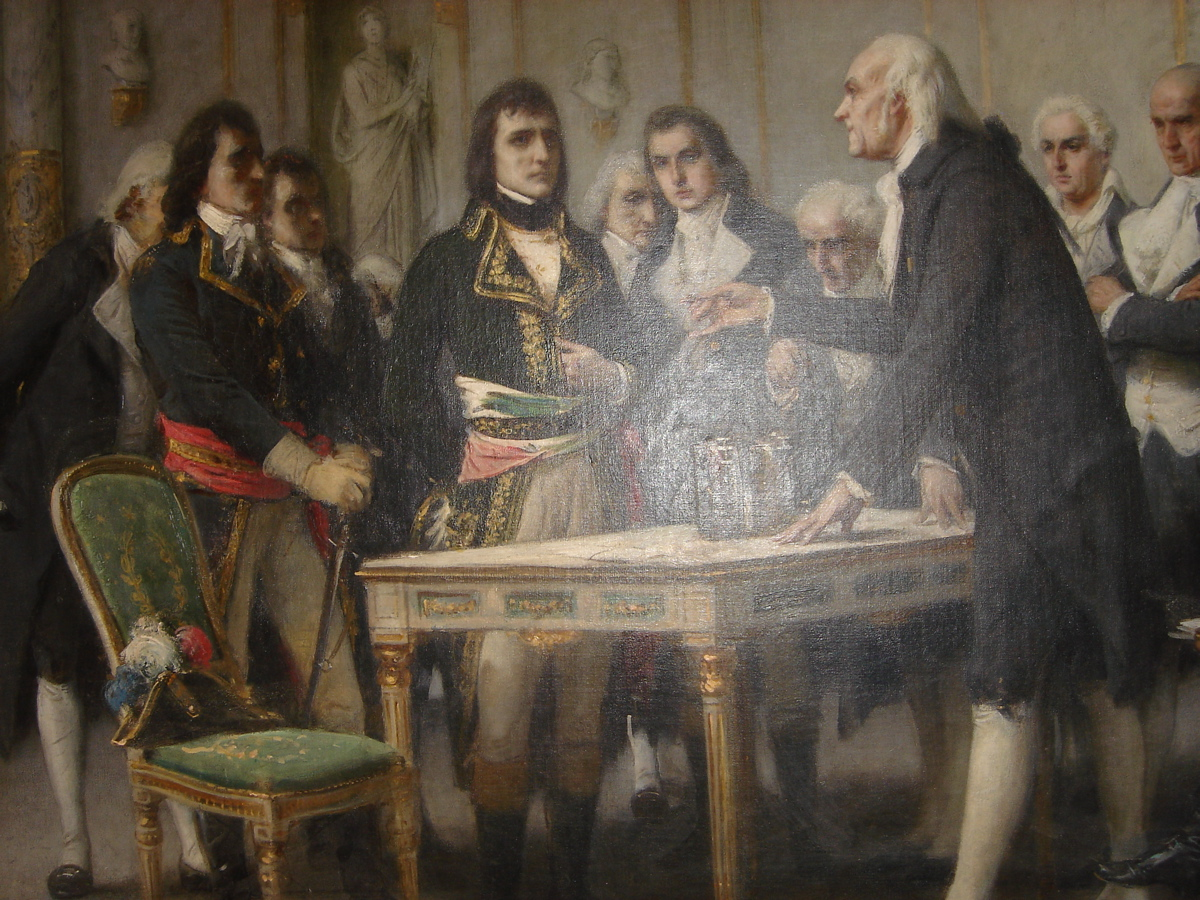
Volta explains the principle of the electric column to Napoleon in 1801.

In 1809, Volta became an associated member of the Royal Institute of the Netherlands. In honour of his work, Volta was made a count by Napoleon Bonaparte in 1810.

Volta retired in 1819 to his estate in Camnago, a frazione of Como, Italy, now named "Camnago Volta" in his honour. He died there on 5 March 1827, just after his 82nd birthday. Volta's remains were buried in Camnago Volta.

=== Legacy ===
Volta's legacy is celebrated by the Tempio Voltiano memorial located in the public gardens by the lake. There is also a museum that was built in his honour, which exhibits some of the equipment that Volta used to conduct experiments. Nearby stands the Villa Olmo, which houses the Voltian Foundation, an organization promoting scientific activities. Volta carried out his experimental studies and produced his first inventions near Como.

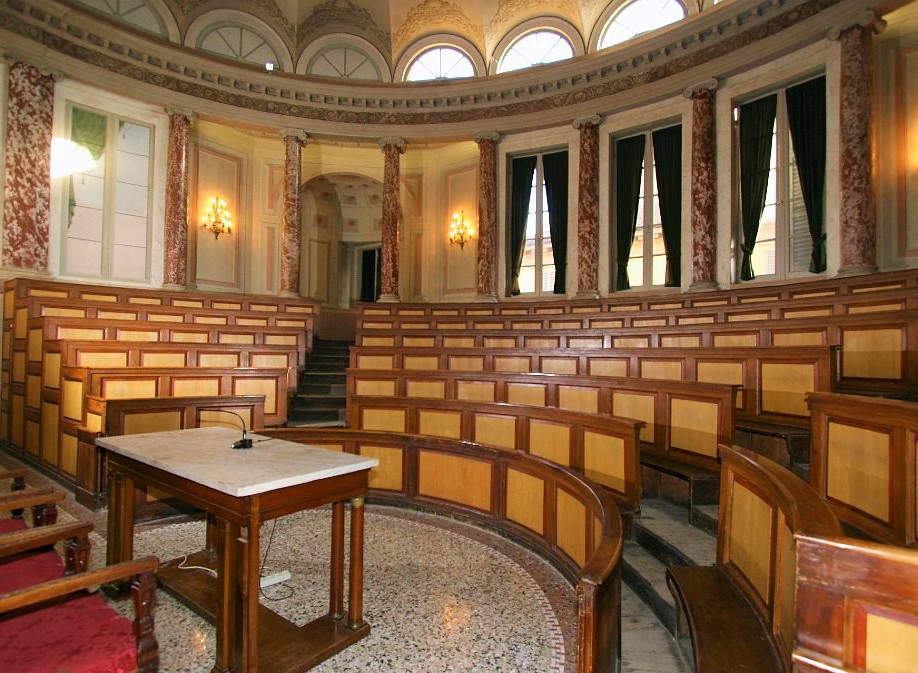
Leopoldo Pollack, Aula Volta, 1787, Old Campus of the University of Pavia

In the Old Campus of the University of Pavia, there is the classroom (Aula Volta) commissioned by Emperor Joseph II to Leopoldo Pollack in 1787 for the lectures of Alessandro Volta, while in the University History Museum there are many scientific instruments that belonged to Volta.

In 1927, an international physics conference, the Como Conference was held at Lake Como for the 100th anniversary of his death.

His image was depicted on the Italian Lire 10,000 note (1990–1997) along with a sketch of his voltaic pile.

In late 2017, Nvidia announced a new workstation-focused GPU microarchitecture called Volta.

The electric eel species Electrophorus voltai, described in 2019 as the strongest bioelectricity producer in nature, was named after Volta.

== Religious beliefs ==
Volta was raised as a Catholic and for all of his life continued to maintain his belief. Because he was not ordained a clergyman as his family expected, he was sometimes accused of being irreligious and some people have speculated about his possible unbelief, stressing that "he did not join the Church", or that he virtually "ignored the church's call". Nevertheless, he cast out doubts in a declaration of faith in which he said:

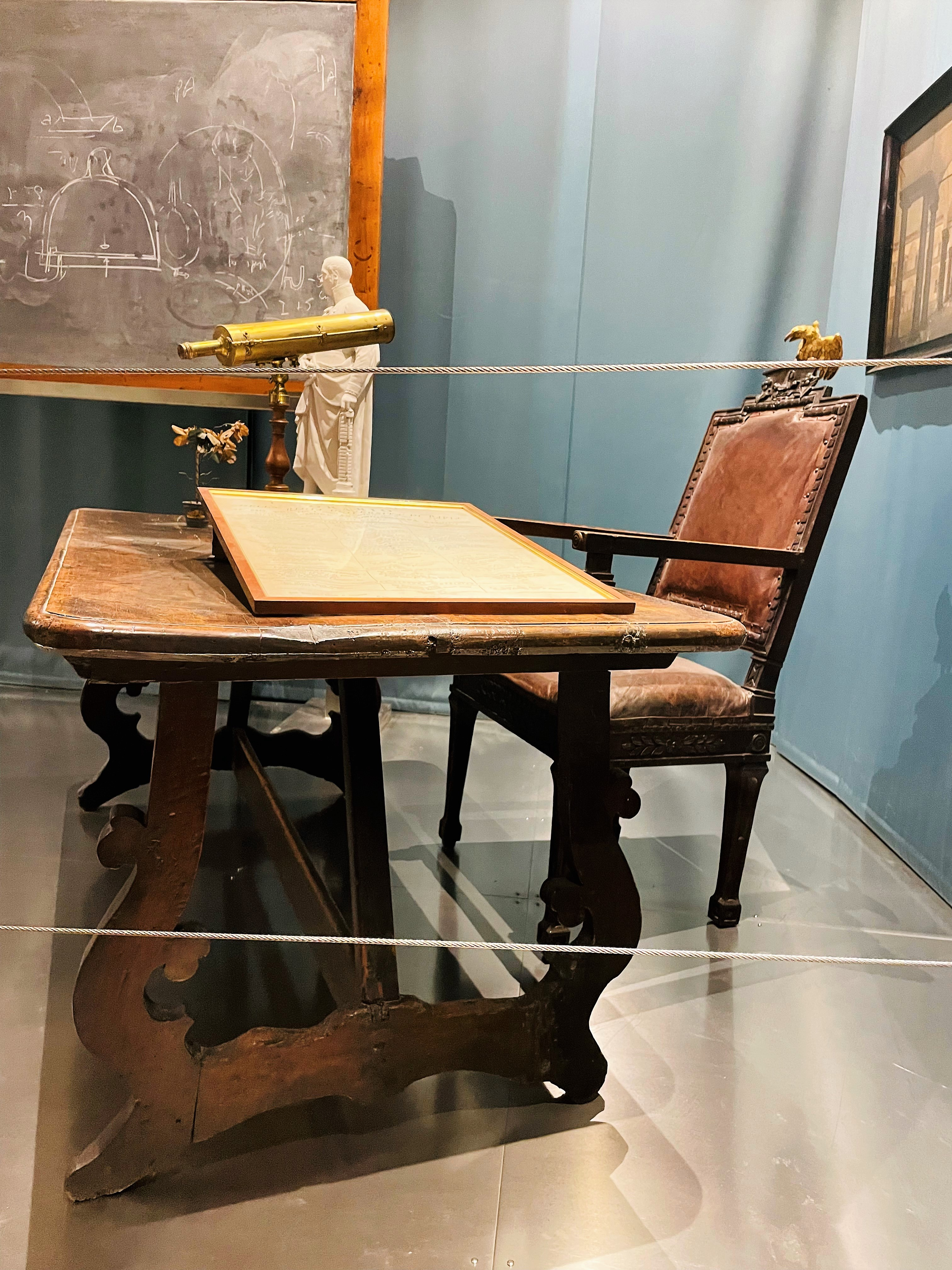
The chair and the blackboard of Alessandro Volta, University History Museum of the University of Pavia

I do not understand how anyone can doubt the sincerity and constancy of my attachment to the religion which I profess, the Roman, Catholic and Apostolic religion in which I was born and brought up, and of which I have always made confession, externally and internally. I have, indeed, and only too often, failed in the performance of those good works which are the mark of a Catholic Christian, and I have been guilty of many sins: but through the special mercy of God I have never, as far as I know, wavered in my faith... In this faith I recognise a pure gift of God, a supernatural grace; but I have not neglected those human means which confirm belief, and overthrow the doubts which at times arise. I studied attentively the grounds and basis of religion, the works of apologists and assailants, the reasons for and against, and I can say that the result of such study is to clothe religion with such a degree of probability, even for the merely natural reason, that every spirit unperverted by sin and passion, every naturally noble spirit must love and accept it. May this confession which has been asked from me and which I willingly give, written and subscribed by my own hand, with authority to show it to whomsoever you will, for I am not ashamed of the Gospel, may it produce some good fruit!

== Publications ==
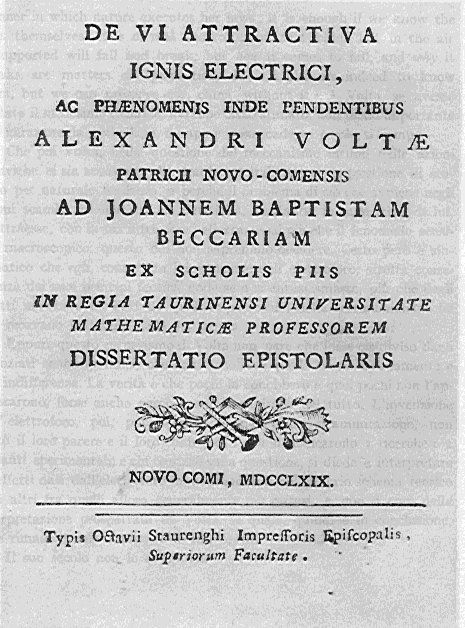
Front page of De vi attractiva ignis electrici

- De vi attractiva ignis electrici, ac phaenomenis inde pendentibus [The attractive force of an electric fire and the resulting phenomena] (in Latin). Novo Comi: Typis Octavii Staurenghi. 1769. OCLC 1419897.

=== Lesser known collections ===
- Briefe über thierische elektricität (1900) (Letters about animal electricity, Available through Worldcat.org libraries, Leipzig, W. Engelmann, publisher)
- Untersuchungen über den Galvanismus, 1796 bis 1800 (Studies on Galvanism, Available through Worldcat.org libraries)
- Del modo di render sensibilissima la più debole elettricità sia naturale, sia artificiale (Of the method of rendering very sensible the weakest natural or artificial electricity By Alexander Volta, Professor Of Experimental Philosophy In Como, &c. Read at the Royal Society, 14 March 1782, Held in WorldCat libraries)

== See also ==
- Armstrong effect
- Electrophorus
- History of the battery
- History of the internal combustion engine
- Lemon battery
- Mercury beating heart
- Thermoelectric effect
- Volta (lunar crater)
- Volta Prize
