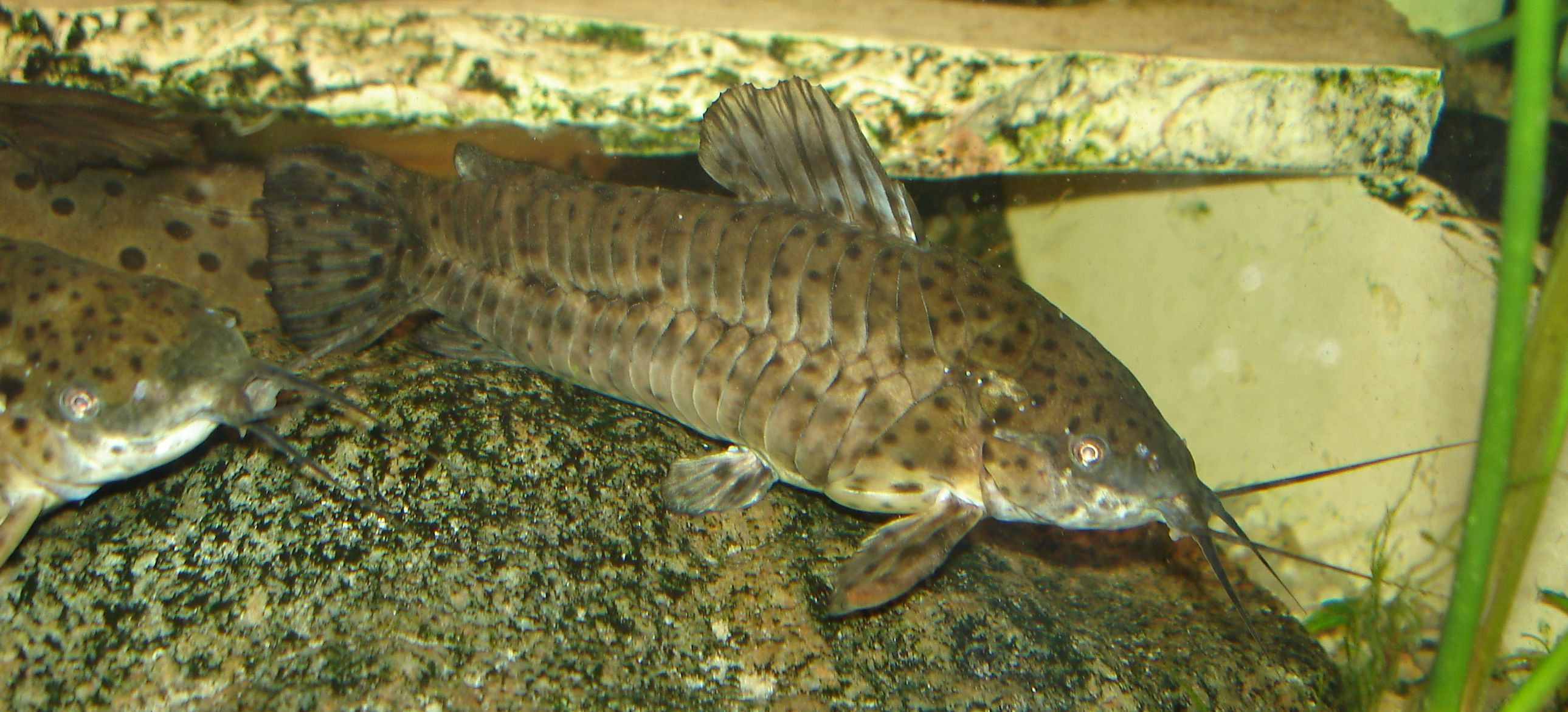
- Megalechis thoracata

Scientific classification
- Kingdom: Animalia
- Phylum: Chordata
- Class: Actinopterygii
- Order: Siluriformes
- Family: Callichthyidae
- Subfamily: Callichthyinae
- Genus: Megalechis; R. Reis, 1997

Type species
- Callichthys thoracatus Valenciennes, 1840

= Megalechis =

Genus of fishes

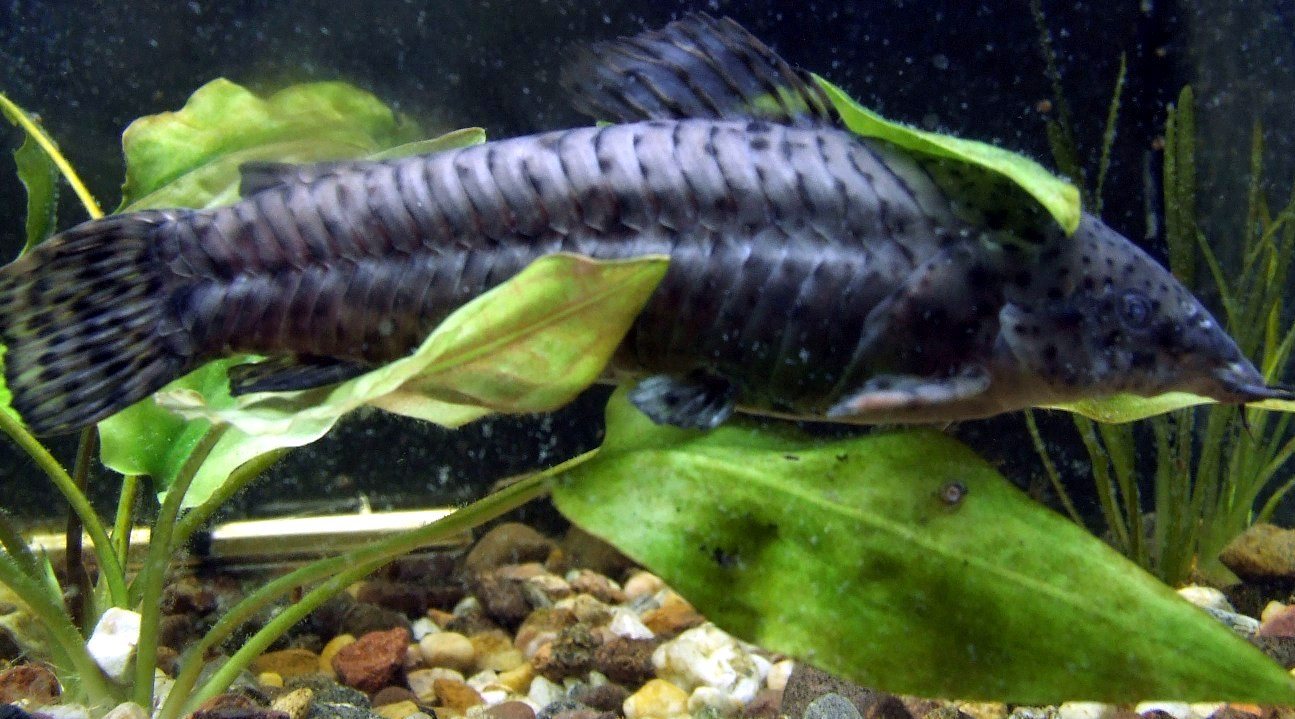
Megalechis thoracata

Megalechis is a genus of freshwater ray-finned fish belonging to the family Callichthyidae and the subfamily Callichthyinae, the armoured catfishes. The catfishes in this genus are found in South America.

== Taxonomy ==
The name is derived from the Greek megas, meaning "great", and the Greek lekis, meaning "plate".

No uniquely derived features are known for Megalechis.

A change in the synonymy of the species of Megalechis occurred in 2005. It is especially confusing because the name M. thoracata remains valid, but applies to the species formerly known as M. personata, which becomes a new junior synonym of M. thoracata. On the other hand, the species formerly known as M. thoracata is now named M. picta.

== Species ==
There are currently two recognized species in this genus:

- Megalechis picta (J. P. Müller & Troschel, 1849) (Spotted hoplo)
- Megalechis thoracata (Valenciennes, 1840)

== Distribution ==
Both species of Megalechis are distributed east of the Andes in the northern portion of South America, including the Amazonas and Orinoco rivers, as well as the coastal drainages of the Guyanas.

== Description ==
M. thoracata is distinguished from M. picta by a comparatively shorter dorsal fin spine, the anal fin with six (rarely five) branched rays instead of an anal fin with five, rarely four, branched rays, and the caudal fin dotted or dusky often with a clearer band at the base of rays versus a caudal fin with a conspicuous transverse dark band and dark distal border. Megalechis species grow to about 12–15 centimetres SL.

Reproductive males have an extremely developed pectoral fin spine, like that of Hoplosternum littorale. In M. thoracata, males are also larger than females.
