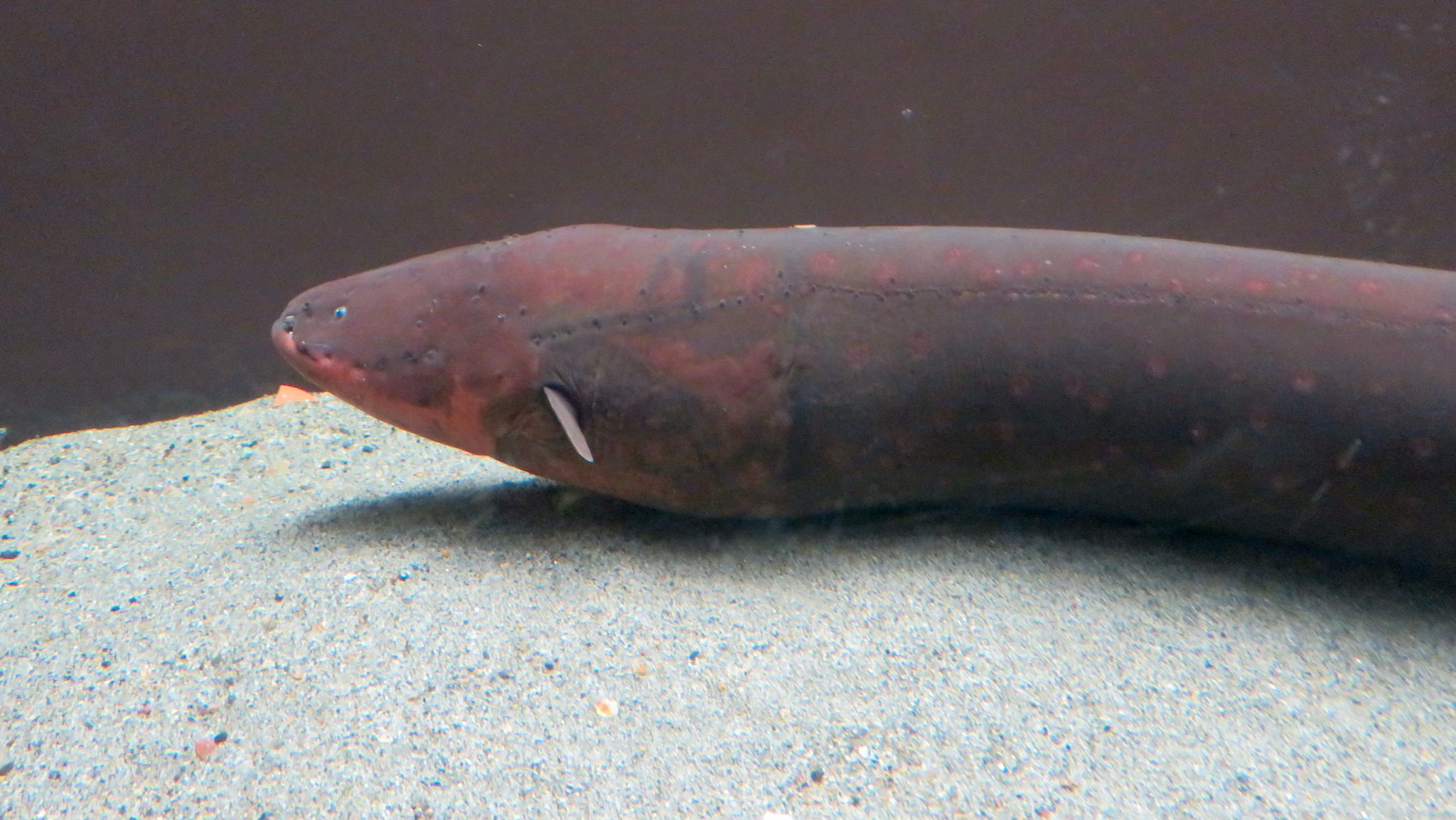
- Electrophorus varii found in Gifu World Fresh Water Aquarium.
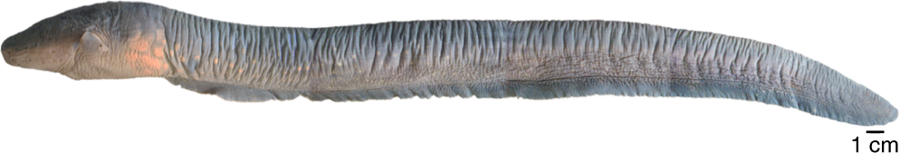

Scientific classification
- Kingdom: Animalia
- Phylum: Chordata
- Class: Actinopterygii
- Division: Teleostei
- Order: Gymnotiformes
- Family: Gymnotidae
- Genus: Electrophorus
- Species: E. varii

Binomial name
- Electrophorus varii de Santana, Wosiacki, Crampton, Sabaj, Dillman, Mendes-Júnior and Castro e Castro, 2019

= Electrophorus varii =

Species of electric eel

Electrophorus varii, or Vari’s electric eel, is a species of electric eel found in South America.

== Taxonomy ==
It was previously classified within Electrophorus electricus when that species was considered the only one in the genus Electrophorus, but a 2019 analysis described it and E. voltai as distinct species based on both their deep genetic divergences and differences in the voltage produced by each species. It is also thought to be the most basal member of the three Electrophorus species, diverging during the late Miocene. It is named in honor of American ichthyologist Richard P. Vari. Despite recognition of E. varii, Electrophorus multivalvulus was described from the western Amazon in 1944, and this species name is therefore likely to take precedence over E. varii, pending a more thorough taxonomic revision.

== Distribution ==
It is found throughout the lowland habitats of the Amazon Basin and in some streams in the Guiana Shield, in contrast to the other two species in the genus, which are adapted to only upland shield habitats. It inhabits turbid rivers with little oxygen and sandy or muddy bottoms.

== Description ==
This species closely resembles E. electricus, but lacks the clear band along the body that is usually present in E. electricus. This species produces the second-highest maximum voltage of the three Electrophorus species, at about 572 volts.
