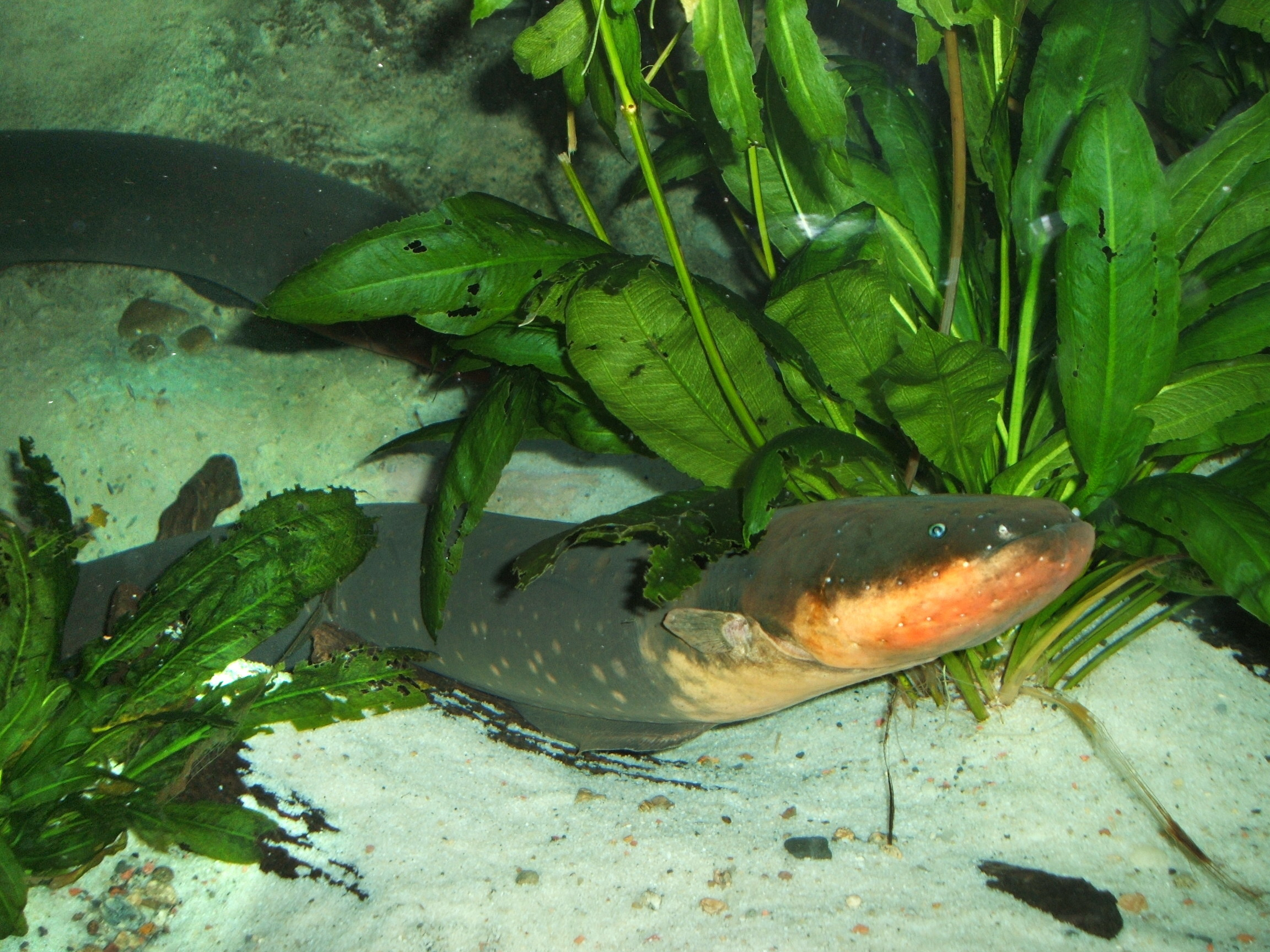
- Electric eel at the New England Aquarium, United States

Conservation status
- Least Concern (IUCN 3.1)

Scientific classification
- Kingdom: Animalia
- Phylum: Chordata
- Class: Actinopterygii
- Division: Teleostei
- Order: Gymnotiformes
- Family: Gymnotidae
- Genus: Electrophorus
- Species: E. electricus

Binomial name
- Electrophorus electricus (Linnaeus, 1766)

Synonyms
- Gymnotus electricus Linnaeus, 1766; Gymnotus regius delle Chiaje, 1847; Gymnotus tremulus Houttuyn 1764

= Electrophorus electricus =

South American electric fish

Electrophorus electricus is the best-known species of electric eel. It is a South American electric fish. Until the discovery of two additional species in 2019, Electrophorus was classified as monotypic, with E. electricus as the sole species. Despite the name, it is not an eel, but rather a knifefish. It is considered as a freshwater teleost which contains an electrogenic tissue that produces electric discharges.

== Taxonomic history ==
The species has been reclassified several times. When originally described by Carl Linnaeus in 1766, he used the name Gymnotus electricus, placing it in the same genus as Gymnotus carapo (banded knifefish) which he had described several years earlier. In 1864, the electric eel was moved to its own genus, Electrophorus, by Theodore Gill.

In September 2019, David de Santana et al. suggested the division of the genus into three species based on DNA divergence, ecology and habitat, anatomy and physiology, and electrical ability: E. electricus, E. voltai sp. nov., and E. varii sp. nov. The study found E. electricus to be the sister species to E. voltai, with both species diverging during the Pliocene.

== Anatomy ==
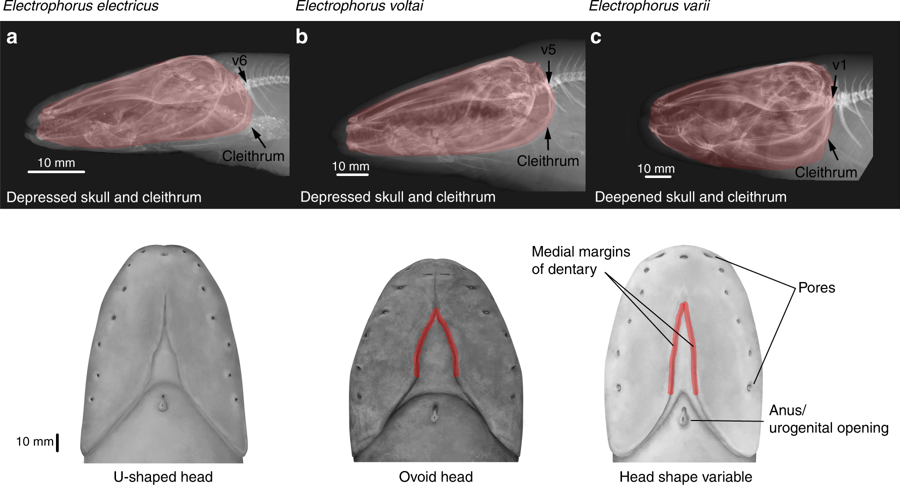
Comparison of the three species of Electrophorus

E. electricus has an elongated, cylindrical body, typically growing to about 2 m (6 ft 7 in) in length, and 20 kg (44 lb) in weight. Their coloration is dark gray-brown on the back and yellow or orange on the belly. Mature females have a darker abdomen. They have no scales. The mouth is square and positioned at the end of the snout. The anal fin extends the length of the body to the tip of the tail. As in other ostariophysan fishes, the swim bladder has two chambers. The anterior chamber is connected to the inner ear by a series of small bones derived from neck vertebrae called the Weberian apparatus, which greatly enhances its hearing capability. The posterior chamber extends along the whole length of the body and maintains the fish's buoyancy.

E. electricus has a vascularized respiratory system with gas exchange occurring through epithelial tissue in its buccal cavity. As obligate air-breathers, E. electricus must rise to the surface about every ten minutes to inhale before returning to the bottom. Nearly eighty percent of the oxygen used by the fish is obtained in this way.

== Physiology ==
E. electricus has three pairs of abdominal organs that produce electricity: the main organ, Hunter's organ, and Sachs' organ. These organs occupy a large part of its body, and give the electric eel the ability to generate two types of electric organ discharges: low voltage and high voltage. These organs are made of electrocytes, lined up so a current of ions can flow through them and stacked so each one adds to a potential difference. The three electrical organs are developed from muscle and exhibit several biochemical properties and morphological features of the muscle sarcolemma; they are found symmetrically along both sides of the eel.

When the eel finds its prey, the brain sends a signal through the nervous system to the electrocytes. This opens the ion channels, allowing sodium to flow through, reversing the polarity momentarily. By causing a sudden difference in electric potential, it generates an electric current in a manner similar to a battery, in which stacked plates each produce an electric potential difference. Electric eels are also capable of controlling their prey's nervous systems with their electrical abilities; by controlling their victim's nervous system and muscles via electrical pulses, they can keep prey from escaping or force it to move so they can locate its position.

Electric eels use electricity in multiple ways. Low voltages are used to sense the surrounding environment. High voltages are used to detect prey and, separately, stun them, at which point the electric eel applies a suction-feeding bite.

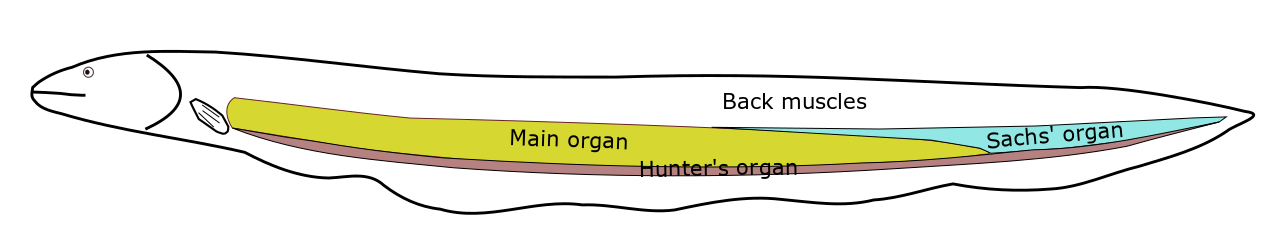
Anatomy of an electric eel's electric organs

Sachs' organ is associated with electrolocation. Inside the organ are many muscle-like cells, called electrocytes. Each cell produces 0.15 V, the cells being stacked in series to enable the organ to generate nearly 10 V at around 25 Hz in frequency. These signals are emitted by the main organ; Hunter's organ can emit signals at rates of several hundred hertz.

There are several physiological differences among the three electric organs, which allow them to have very different functions. The main electrical organ and the strong-voltage section of Hunter's organ are rich in calmodulin, a protein that is involved in high-voltage production. Additionally, the three organs have varying amounts of Na+/K+-ATPase, which is a Na+/K+ ion pump that is crucial in the formation of voltage. The main and Hunter's organs have a high expression of this protein, giving it a high sensitivity to changes in ion concentration, whereas Sachs' organ has a low expression of this protein.

The typical output is sufficient to stun or deter virtually any animal. The eels can vary the intensity of the electric discharge, using lower discharges for hunting and higher intensities for stunning prey or defending themselves. They can also concentrate the discharge by curling up and making contact at two points along its body.

E. electricus also possesses high frequency–sensitive tuberous receptors, which are distributed in patches over its body. This feature is apparently useful for hunting other Gymnotiformes. E. electricus has been prominent in the study of bioelectricity since the 18th century. The species is of some interest to researchers, who make use of its acetylcholinesterase and adenosine triphosphate.

Despite being the first described species in the genus and thus the most famous example, E. electricus actually has the weakest maximum voltage of the three species in the genus, at only 480 volts (as opposed to 572 volts in E. varii and 860 volts in E. voltai).

== Ecology and life history ==
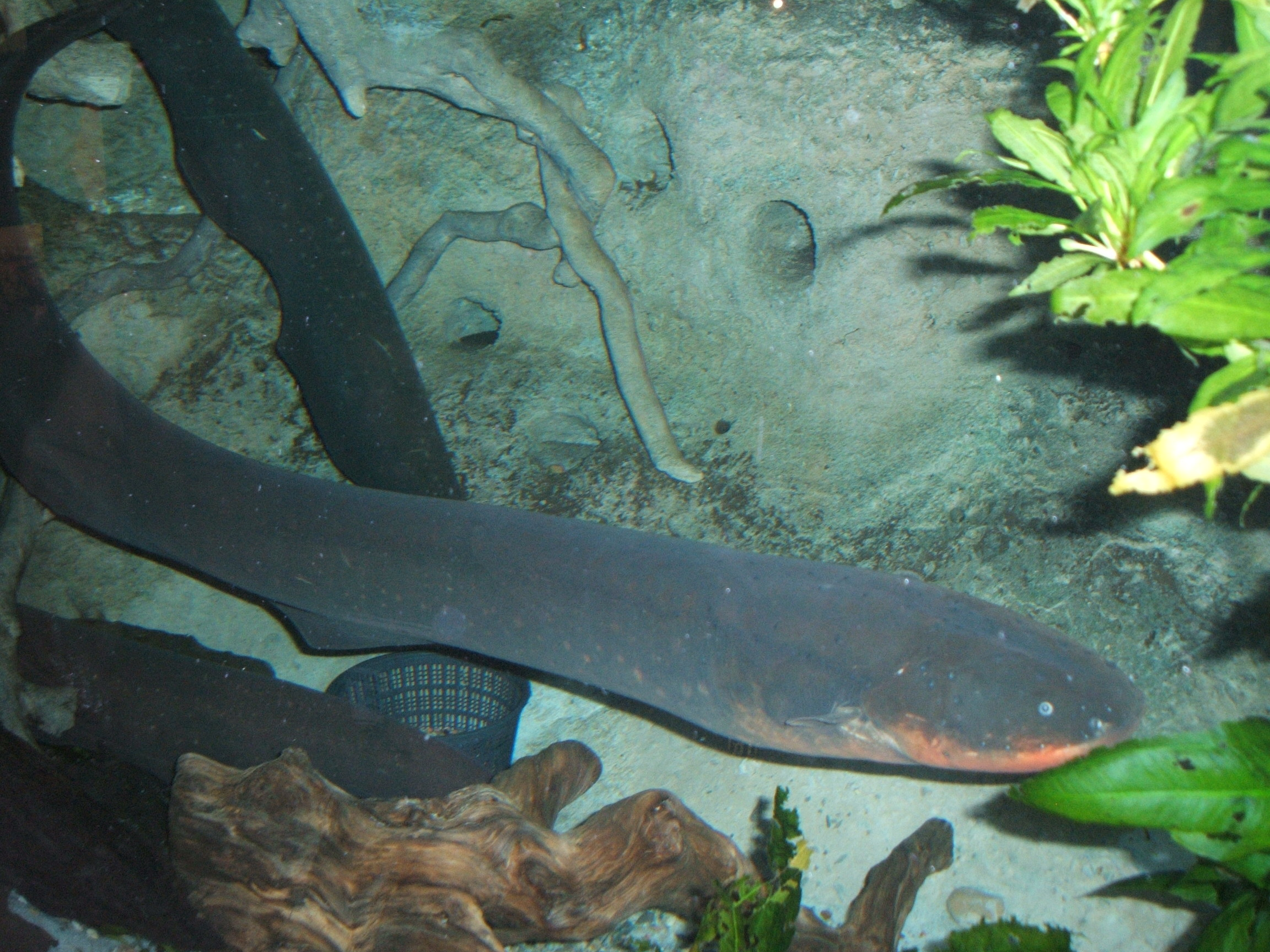
Electric eel at the New England Aquarium

=== Habitat ===
E. electricus is restricted to freshwater habitats in the Guiana Shield. Populations in the Amazon basin, Brazilian Shield, and other parts of the Guiana Shield are now thought to belong to E. varii and E. voltai.

=== Feeding ecology ===
Juveniles of E. electricus feed on various invertebrates, although adult eels consume animals such as fish, frogs and small mammals. First-born hatchlings eat other eggs and embryos from later clutches.

=== Reproduction ===
E. electricus is known for its unusual breeding behavior. In the dry season, a male eel makes a nest from his saliva into which the female lays her eggs. As many as 3,000 young hatch from the eggs in one nest. Males grow to be larger than females by about 35 cm (14 in).
