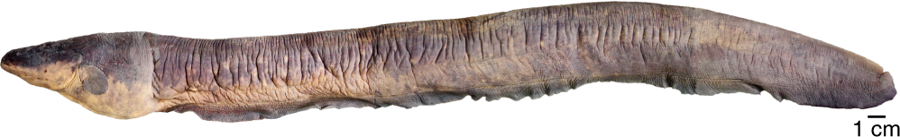

Conservation status
- Least Concern (IUCN 3.1)

Scientific classification
- Kingdom: Animalia
- Phylum: Chordata
- Class: Actinopterygii
- Division: Teleostei
- Order: Gymnotiformes
- Family: Gymnotidae
- Genus: Electrophorus
- Species: E. voltai

Binomial name
- Electrophorus voltai de Santana, Wosiacki, Crampton, Sabaj, Dillman, Castro e Castro, Bastos and Vari, 2019

= Electrophorus voltai =

Species of electric eel

Electrophorus voltai, or Volta's electric eel, is a species of electric eel found in South America. It is the strongest known bioelectricity generator in nature, producing up to 860 volts.

== Taxonomy ==
It was previously classified within Electrophorus electricus when that species was considered the only one in the genus Electrophorus, but a 2019 analysis described it and E. varii as distinct species based on both their deep genetic divergences and differences in the voltage produced by each species. It is thought to have diverged from its sister species E. electricus during the Pliocene. It is named in honor of the physicist Alessandro Volta, who is widely credited as the creator of the electric battery.

== Distribution ==
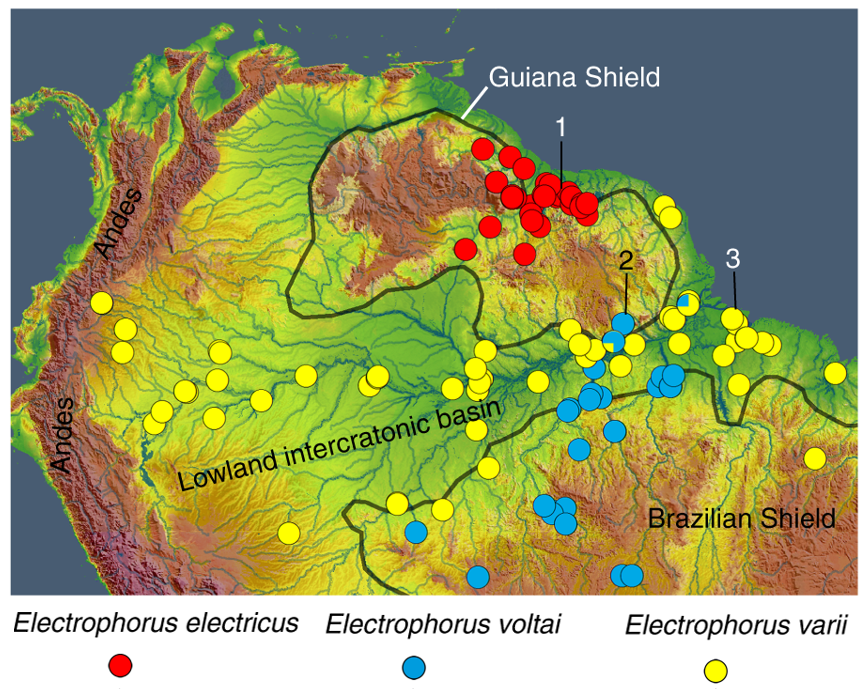
Map of ranges of each Electric Eel

It inhabits upland habitats, primarily north-flowing rivers of the Brazilian Shield, but also some south-flowing rivers of the Guiana Shield. In some streams of the Guiana Shield, it is sympatric with E. varii.

== Description ==
It closely resembles E. electricus but differs in skull morphology, including having a depressed skull and a wide head. It has a maximum voltage of 860 volts, making it not only the strongest bioelectricity generator of the three electric eel species, but also of any animal.

It can reach 2.5 m (8 ft 2 in) and 22 kg (49 lb), making them the largest species of the Gymnotiformes. Males get larger than females by about 35 cm (14 in).

== Behavior ==
A 2021 study reported the first known occurrence of pack hunting by electric eels in a population of E. voltai at the mouth of the Iriri River in Brazil.
