= Superior mouth =

Type of mouth typically seen in fish

A superior mouth is a mouth that opens upward, with the lower jaw more anterior than the upper jaw. This is an effect typically seen in fish. This usually means that the fish feeds from the surface of the body of water in which it dwells. A superior mouth is associated with fish in more stationary waters, such as those in lake ecosystems.
