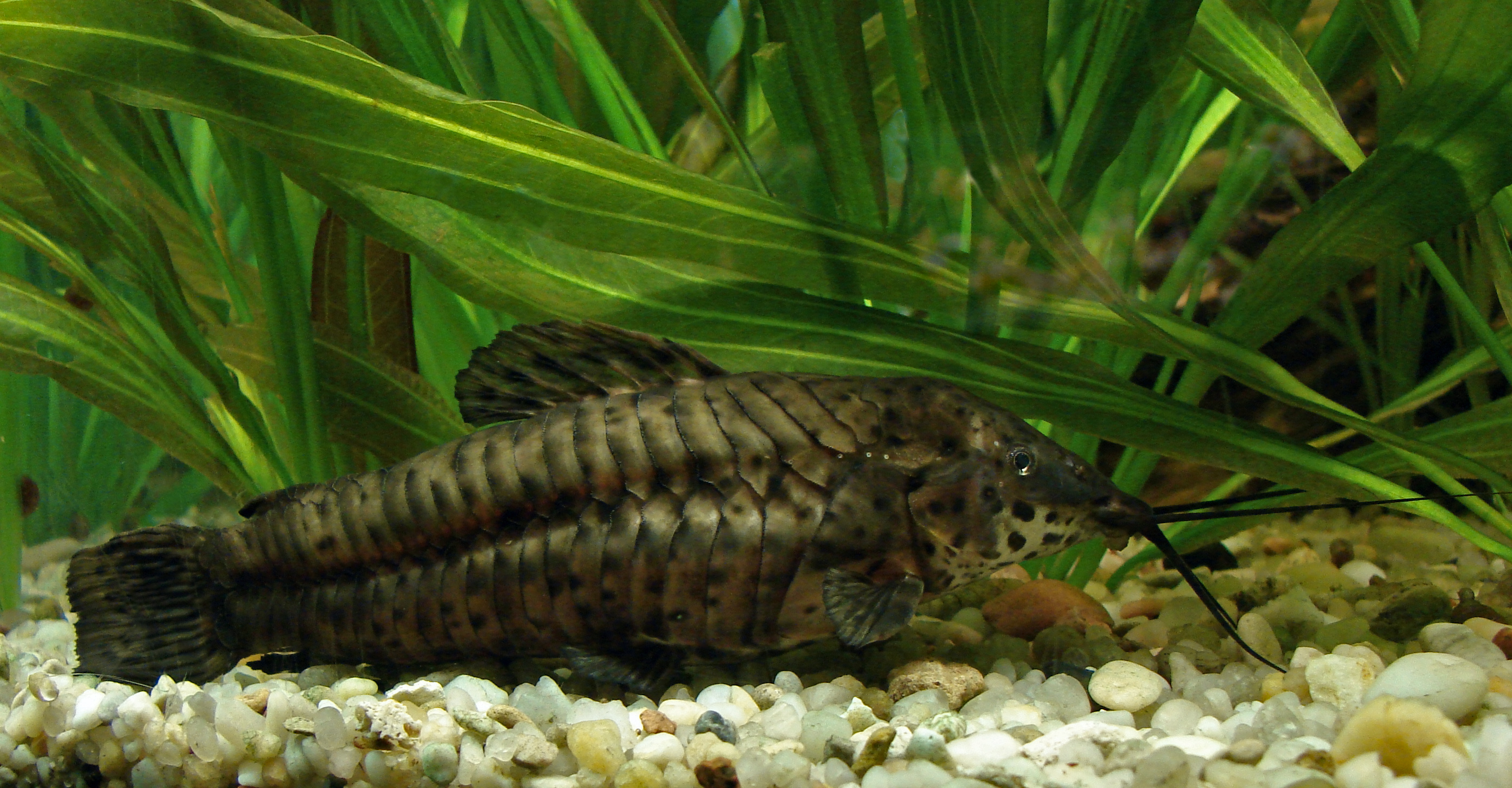

Conservation status
- Least Concern (IUCN 3.1)

Scientific classification
- Kingdom: Animalia
- Phylum: Chordata
- Class: Actinopterygii
- Division: Teleostei
- Order: Siluriformes
- Family: Callichthyidae
- Genus: Megalechis
- Species: M. thoracata

Binomial name
- Megalechis thoracata (Valenciennes, 1840)

Synonyms
- Callichthys thoracatus Valenciennes, 1840; Hoplosternum thoracatum (Valenciennes, 1840); Callichthys longifilis Valenciennes, 1840; Callichthys personatus Ranzani, 1841; Hoplosternum personatum (Ranzani, 1841); Megalechis personata (Ranzani, 1841); Callichthys exaratus Müller & Troschel, 1849; Hoplosternum thoracatum surinamensis Hoedeman, 1952

= Megalechis thoracata =

Species of catfish

Megalechis thoracata (black marble hoplo, spotted hoplo) is a species of freshwater ray-finned fish belonging to the family Callichthyidae and the subfamily Callichthyinae, the armoured catfishes. M. thoracata is found east of the Andes in the Amazon, Orinoco, and upper Paraguay River basins, as well as in the coastal rivers of the Guianas and northern Brazil. Recent introductions were recorded in the upper Paraná River drainage.

== Care in captivity ==
{{This section almost certainly does not comply with Wikipedia:NOTHOWTO}}

Overview: The Spotted Hoplo Catfish is an incredibly hardy and relatively easy species to keep in captivity, with the main difficulty being the maximum size of around 6 inches or 15 centimetres.They are a very peaceful fish, with the only exception being when the males are guarding a bubble nest at breeding time. They can be kept with almost all tankmates, but they will likely eat anything that can fit in their mouths due to their opportunistic nature. This rule also applies to larger fish, as the Hoplo may get eaten or have its barbels or fins damaged by large, potentially aggressive fish, such as South American Cichlids, African Cichlids, larger catfish and most larger fish species that can fit the Hoplo in its mouth or shows aggression.

Tank Setup: They require a soft sand substrate, as they are bottom dwellers that can often be observed foraging/searching for food. A gentle substrate is essential, as other coarse grained or abrasive substrates can irritate the fish's sensitive barbels, and even cause them to fall off. To thrive in the aquarium, they need a minimum tank size of 55 US liquid gallons, but as a rule of thumb for this fish, the larger the tank, the better. They are semi-social creatures that prefer to be kept in groups of at least five, but still seem content alone or in pairs. The spotted hoplo catfish needs hiding places, usually in the form of rocks, wood and plants, such as variations of Anubias, valisineria, java fern and micranthemum. Floating plants are also appreciated, as they provide extra cover.

Water Conditions: Despite the Hoplo being a very hardy fish, like all fish they need a mature, cycled tank with the correct parameters for almost all tropical species. As they are a species of tropical fish, the optimal temperature for them is around 24–28 °C (75–82 °F), but they can adapt to temperatures in the 22–30 °C (72–86 °F) range, although this is not recommended and over a long period of time this can lead to elevated stress levels, amongst other health concerns.

== Habitat ==
The natural habitat of Megalechis thoracata is slow flowing, low oxygen parts of the Amazon, Orinoco, and upper Paraguay River basins. For this reason, catfish of the family Callichthyidae among other fish, have developed a unique way of breathing, where the fish will rise to the surface of the water and ingest a small amount of air. The oxygen is then absorbed through the lining of the stomach and intestine. This is known as gastrointestinal respiration. They will feed on small to medium-sized worms and other invertebrates, small fish, and general detritus.

== Ecology ==
M. thoracata has been observed to produce sounds during territorial behavior in males at their nest sites and especially during spawning, and during aggressive behavior in both sexes. M. thoracata males aggressively defend territories against intruders.
