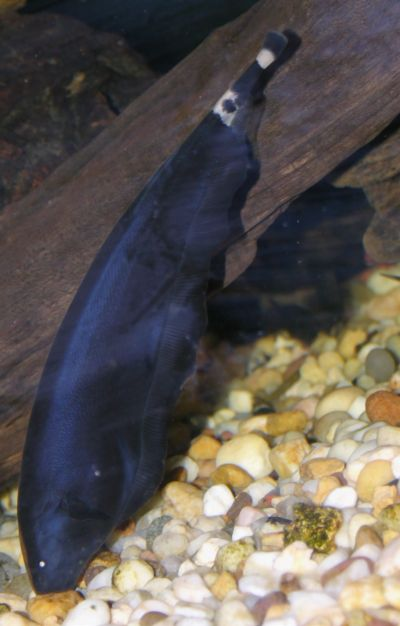
- Black ghost knifefish (A. albifrons)

Scientific classification
- Kingdom: Animalia
- Phylum: Chordata
- Class: Actinopterygii
- Order: Gymnotiformes
- Family: Apteronotidae
- Subfamily: Apteronotinae
- Genus: Apteronotus; Lacépède, 1800

Type species
- Gymnotus albifrons Linnaeus, 1766

Synonyms
- Sternarchus Bloch & Schneider, 1801; Ubidia Miles, 1945

= Apteronotus =

Genus of fishes

Apteronotus is a genus of weakly electric knifefish in the family Apteronotidae, distinguished by the presence of a tiny tail fin. This genus is restricted to tropical and subtropical South America (Amazon, Orinoco, Río de la Plata and Magdalena basins, as well as rivers in western Colombia and the Guianas) and Panama where found in a wide range of freshwater habitats. They feed on small animals.

Depending on the exact species, they reach a total length of up to about 18–50 cm (7–20 in). Although it has been claimed that A. magdalenensis is up to 130 cm (4.3 ft) long, this is not supported by recent studies and likely the result of confusion with Sternopygus aequilabiatus. Members of Apteronotus fall into three species groups based on their morphology: the A. albifrons group have a rounded snout and are black or dark brown with a contrasting light stripe on the top of the head, and bands on the tail and at its base, the A. leptorhynchus group have an elongate, slender snout (especially in males) and are brown with a light stripe along the head and back, and a band on the tail, and the A. bonapartii group have an elongate (males) or rounded (females) snout and are brown or gray (capable of some color change) with a light band on the tail. The last group is not closely related to the first two and will likely need to be moved to another genus. A genetic study published in 2019 found that the genus is strongly polyphyletic with several groups that are quite distantly related.

== Species ==
Apteronotus contains the following recognized species:

- Apteronotus acidops Triques, 2011
- Apteronotus albertoi Peixoto, Dutra, Datovo, Menezes & de Santana, 2021
- Apteronotus albifrons (Linnaeus, 1766) (Black ghost knifefish)
- Apteronotus anu de Santana & Vari, 2013
- Apteronotus apurensis Fernández-Yépez, 1968
- Apteronotus baniwa de Santana & Vari, 2013
- Apteronotus bonapartii (Castelnau, 1855)
- Apteronotus brasiliensis (J. T. Reinhardt, 1852)
- Apteronotus camposdapazi de Santana & Lehmann-A., 2006
- Apteronotus caudimaculosus de Santana 2003
- Apteronotus cuchillejo (Schultz, 1949)
- Apteronotus cuchillo Schultz, 1949
- Apteronotus ellisi (Alonso de Arámburu, 1957)
- Apteronotus eschmeyeri de Santana, Maldenado-Ocampo, Severi & G. N. Mendes, 2004
- Apteronotus ferrarisi de Santana & Vari, 2013
- Apteronotus galvisi de Santana, Maldonado-Ocampo & Crampton, 2007
- Apteronotus jurubidae (Fowler, 1944)
- Apteronotus leptorhynchus (M. M. Ellis, )1912 (Brown ghost knifefish)
- Apteronotus lindalvae de Santana & Cox Fernandes, 2012
- Apteronotus macrolepis (Steindachner, 1881)
- Apteronotus macrostomus (Fowler, 1943)
- Apteronotus magdalenensis (Miles, 1945)
- Apteronotus magoi de Santana, Castillo G. & Taphorn, 2006
- Apteronotus mariae (C. H. Eigenmann & Fisher, 1914)
- Apteronotus milesi de Santana & Maldonado-Ocampo, 2005
- Apteronotus paranaensis (Schindler, 1940)
- Apteronotus pemon de Santana & Vari, 2013
- Apteronotus quilombola Peixoto, Datovo, Menezes & de Santana, 2021
- Apteronotus rostratus (Meek & Hildebrand, 1913)
- Apteronotus spurrellii (Regan, 1914)

The following cladogram is based on a 2019 phylogenetic study analyzing both mitochondrial and nuclear gene sequences of Apteronotidae. Notably, Apteronotus as traditionally defined is not monophyletic, as seen here;

- Apteronotinae
  - Adontosternarchus
  - - Apteronotus cuchillejo
    - - - - Navajini
            - - - Apteronotus bonapartii
                - Sternarchella
              - - - - Melanosternarchus
                    - Compsaraia
                  - Pariosternarchus
                - Sternarchogiton
            - Tenebrosternarchus
          - Sternarchorhynchus
        - Platyurosternarchus
      - Apteronotini
        - - - Parapteronotus
            - Apteronotus albifrons
          - Apteronotus mariae
        - - - Megadontognathus
            - Apteronotus acidops
          - - - Apteronotus eschmeyeri
              - Apteronotus magdalenensis
            - - Apteronotus baniwa
              - Apteronotus galvisi
