= Sternarchogiton porcinum =

Conservation status
- Least Concern (IUCN 3.1)

Scientific classification
- Kingdom: Animalia
- Phylum: Chordata
- Class: Actinopterygii
- Order: Gymnotiformes
- Family: Apteronotidae
- Genus: Sternarchogiton
- Species: S. porcinum

Binomial name
- Sternarchogiton porcinum C. H. Eigenmann & W. R. Allen, 1942

Species of fish

Sternarchogiton porcinum is a species of weakly electric knifefish in the family Apteronotidae. It is native to deep river channels in the Río Huallaga, Río Napo, and Río Amazonas in Peru, and in the Río Orinoco in Venezuela. Many specimens once identified as S. porcinum from the Brazilian Amazon Basin and the Venezuelan Orinoco are now known to be a different species, S. preto.

S. porcium is distinguishable from all other Sternarchogiton species by the straight dorsal profile of its laterally compressed head. The eyes are small and covered by a thin membrane. The mouth is terminal, with the upper jaw longer than the lower. There are no teeth on the premaxilla and one row of 11 tiny conical teeth on the dentary. Both upper and lower pharyngeal tooth plates are present, bearing 8 and 10 teeth respectively. There is no sexual dimorphism in cranial morphology.

The body is compressed and knife-shaped, with 4-6 rows of scales above the lateral line. The pectoral fins are broad and pointed, containing 15-18 soft rays. The long anal fin contains 182-216 rays. The tail is compressed and moderately long, terminating in a small lanceolate caudal fin with 14-22 rays. The whip-like dorsal electroreceptive appendage inserts in the posterior half of the body. The coloration is uniform white on the sides, tinged pink due to underlying capillaries. The back of the body and head are brown, with white-pink scale margins and white electroreceptor pits. The upper and lower jaws are white. The fins are hyaline, becoming dark brown or grayish black at the margins. The maximum known length is 30 cm.

Like other apteronotids, S. porcium generates a weak electric field for electrolocation and communication. This electric organ discharge has a fundamental frequency around 900 Hz and has a waveform similar to that of S. nattereri. Like S. nattereri, S. porcinum is able to modulate the frequency and amplitude of its EOD to produce communication signals categorized as "chirps" (high frequency elevation, short duration) and "gradual frequency rises" (low frequency elevation, long duration).
