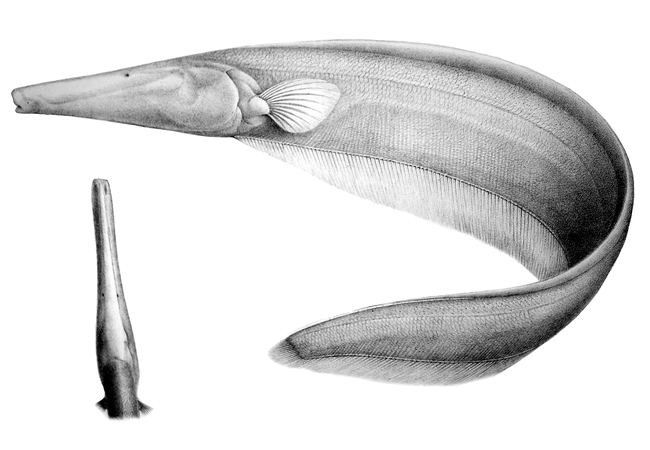

Conservation status
- Least Concern (IUCN 3.1)

Scientific classification
- Kingdom: Animalia
- Phylum: Chordata
- Class: Actinopterygii
- Order: Gymnotiformes
- Family: Apteronotidae
- Subfamily: Sternarchorhamphinae
- Genus: Orthosternarchus; M. M. Ellis, 1913
- Species: O. tamandua

Binomial name
- Orthosternarchus tamandua (Boulenger, 1898)

Synonyms
- (Species): Sternarchus tamandua Boulenger, 1898

= Orthosternarchus =

Species of fish

Orthosternarchus is a monospecific genus of weakly electric knifefish in the family Apteronotidae. The only species in the genus is Orthosternarchus tamandua, the tamandua knifefish. This knifefish is native to the deep river channels of the Amazon basin. This species is characterized by its whitish-pink color (no dark pigment), long tubular snout, long dorsal appendage, and tiny, bilaterally asymmetrical eyes. It is one of two species in the subfamily Sternarchorhamphinae.

== Systematics ==
Orthosternarchus tamandua was originally described as Sternarchus tamandua by George Albert Boulenger in 1880; its species name is from the Tupi word tamanduá, meaning "anteater", in reference to its long snout. In 1905, Eigenmann and Ward placed this species in the genus Sternarchorhamphus, though noting that it may represent a distinct genus. In 1913, Max M. Ellis placed this species into its own genus Orthosternarchus, from the Greek orthos ("straight"), sternon ("chest"), and archos ("rectum"), referring to the straight snout and the forward placement of the urogenital opening.

Ellis saw O. tamandua as a close relative to Sternarchorhamphus, which has been corroborated by recent morphological and molecular analyses. The relationship between these two genera and the rest of the Apteronotidae is less clear, though they are generally regarded as basal within the family. Some authors consider them to be sister taxa to Platyurosternarchus and Sternarchorhynchus, which also have elongate heads. However, in those taxa the elongation is accomplished by lengthening of the jaws, whereas in Orthosternarchus and Sternarchorhamphus it is accomplished by the lengthening of the head while the jaws remain relatively short. This suggests that elongate head shape was independently evolved between the two groups.

== Distribution and habitat ==
Orthosternarchus tamandua is a relatively rarely recorded species found in the Amazon River basin, and is most abundant in the Rio Negro and the Rio Purus. It inhabits both whitewater and blackwater rivers, usually occurring at depths of 6–10 m (20–33 ft) and occasionally shallower or deeper, but has not yet been recorded beyond 20 m (66 ft) down. It is absent from floodplain channels, river edges, and small lakes. A few specimens are known from the confluence of the Rio Solimões and the Rio Negro, and from Lake Prato, Anavilhanas.

== Description ==
Orthosternarchus tamandua is one of the gymnotiforms most specialized to living in deep river channels, O. tamandua resembles fishes adapted to caves in several respects. Their elongated, laterally compressed bodies are nearly unpigmented, appearing bright pink due to the blood underneath. The eyes are tiny and virtually non-functional, and are placed asymmetrically on the head. The asymmetry of the eyes is not correlated with size, sex or environment, but may be related to their degenerate state. The snout is distinctive, being a long, evenly tapering, nearly straight tube measuring four times as long as high. The mouth is relatively small. The dorsal throng (a whip-like appendage used for electroreception) is unusually long and thick, which led it to originally be described as a "very strongly developed adipose fin" by Boulenger. The throng originates close to the rear margin of the skull, which is much more anterior than in other apteronotids.

O. tamandua has a long anal fin, a small caudal fin, and tapering pectoral fins; the dorsal and pelvic fins are absent. The caudal fin shows a great deal of variation due to regeneration after tail loss; in some cases the regenerated fin becomes merged with the anal fin. The fin rays number 9 in the caudal fin, 14-15 in the pectoral fins, and 207-256 in the anal fin. Almost the entire body, except for the dorsal midline, is densely covered with flimsily attached scales, being small and circular towards the front and larger and more rectangular towards the back. There are around 12 rows of scales above the lateral line and 40-42 rows below. The first 5-10 scales along the lateral line are modified into overlapping elongate tubes. The maximum known size is 44 cm (17 in) long and 125 g (4.4 oz).

== Biology and ecology ==
Orthosternarchus tamandua, like other ghost knifefishes, generates a continuous weak electric field for electrolocation and communication. At 452-605 Hz, the electric organ discharge (EOD) of O. tamandua has a much lower frequency than most other apteronotids and approaches the frequencies of the sternopygid knifefishes. The EOD is also unusual in that the waveform is monophasic, with a head-negative spike followed by a positive baseline (the EOD of most apteronotids have both positive and negative spikes). The only other apteronotid known to have a monophasic EOD is the related Sternarchorhamphus muelleri. The monophasic waveform of these two genera is similar to the EOD of a larval Apteronotus, suggesting that it may be a paedomorphic or evolutionarily ancestral trait.
