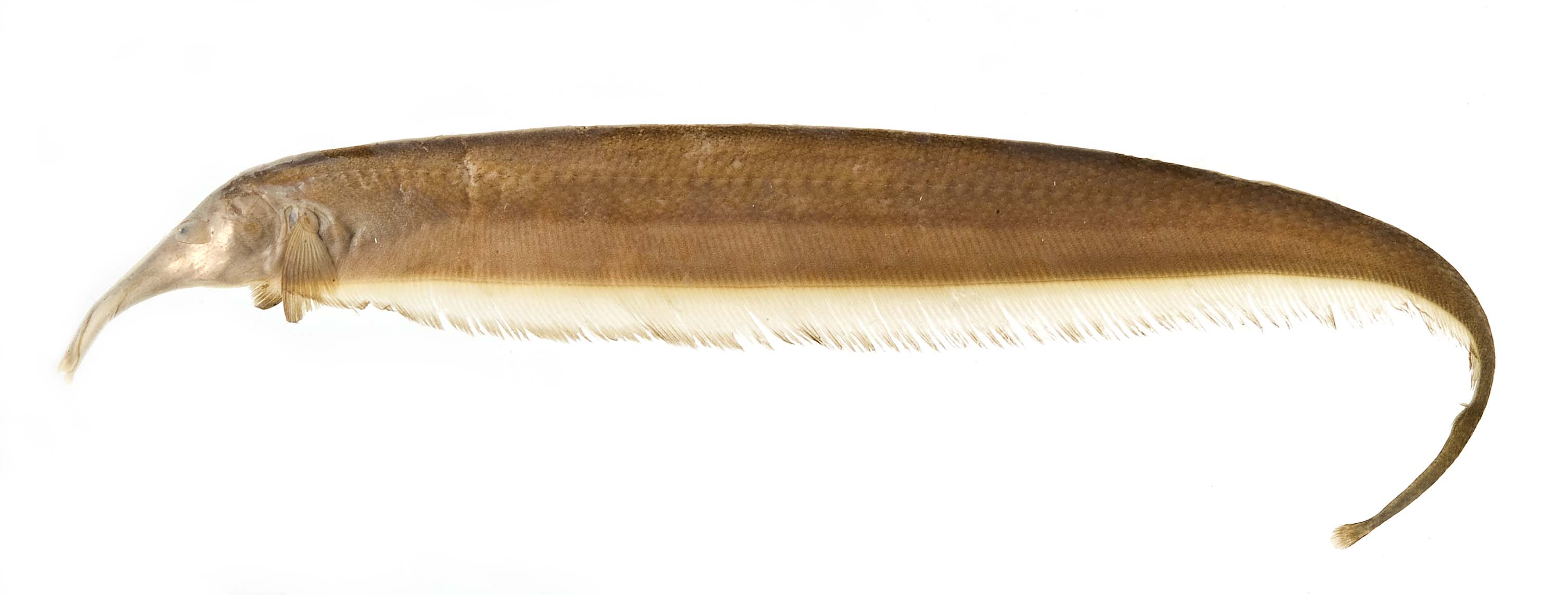

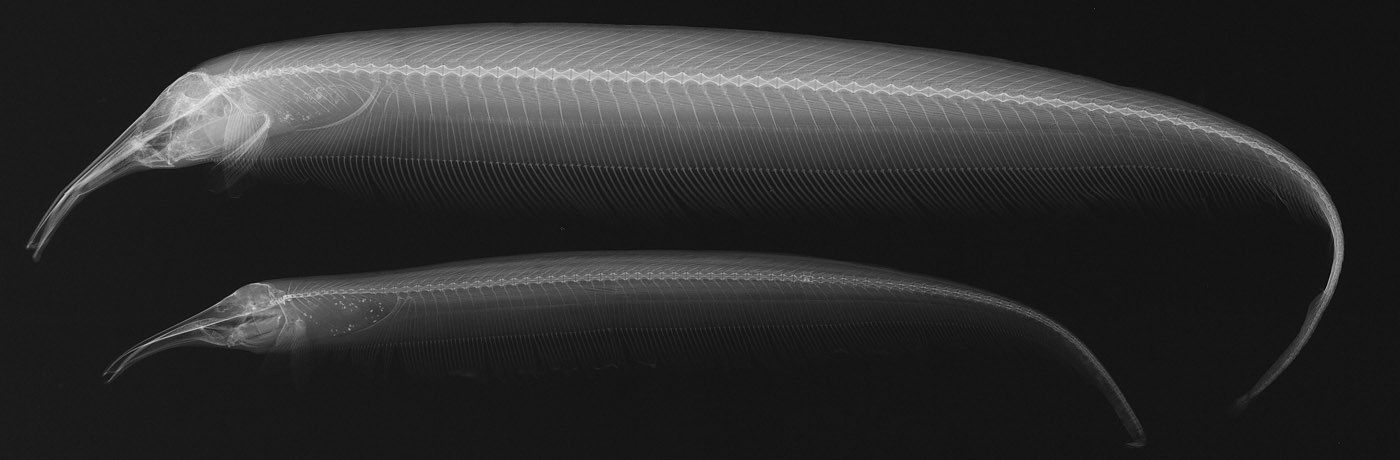
- Sternarchorhynchus retzeri, conventional and X-ray images

Scientific classification
- Domain: Eukaryota
- Kingdom: Animalia
- Phylum: Chordata
- Class: Actinopterygii
- Order: Gymnotiformes
- Family: Apteronotidae
- Subfamily: Apteronotinae
- Genus: Sternarchorhynchus; Castelnau, 1855

Type species
- Sternarchus (Rhamphosternarchus) mulleri, a synonym of Sternarchorhynchus oxyrhynchus Castelnau, 1855

Synonyms
- Rhamphosternarchus Günther, 1870

= Sternarchorhynchus =

Genus of fishes

Sternarchorhynchus is a genus of ghost knifefishes with a long, decurved snout that are found in river basins in tropical South America.

== Distribution, habitat and conservation ==
Of the 32 recognized species, more than 2/3 are restricted to the Amazon basin (including the Tocantins system) in Bolivia, Brazil, Colombia, Ecuador and Peru, 7 species are found in river basins flowing into the Gulf of Paria in Colombia and Venezuela (mostly Orinoco system, but S. mendesi in Guanipa and San Juan), S. freemani is from the Essequibo basin in Guyana, S. galibi is from the Maroni basin in French Guiana and Suriname, and S. britskii is from the upper Paraná basin in Brazil. There are records of Sternarchorhynchus from the Oyapock on the French Guiana–Brazil border, but their validity and taxonomic position is unclear. Most species have relatively small ranges, but a few are more widespread. S. mormyrus of the Amazon and Orinoco basins is the only that occurs in more than one major river system.

The habitat varies depending on species, but they require well-oxygenated waters. They have been recorded in whitewater (like the Amazon River), blackwater (like Tefé River) and clearwater (like the Xingu River). Some species have been found in small streams, less than 0.5 m (1.6 ft) deep, while others inhabit the main stream of major rivers. S. mesensis is known from both above-ground and below-ground habitats, but lacks the cavefish adaptions seen in the only true cave knifefish, Eigenmannia vicentespelaea. Some change habitat with age; adult S. cramptoni and S. mormyrus live in main river channels, but their young are found near the river shore in várzea.

Nine species, all with small ranges in Brazil and most restricted to fast-flowing waters including rapids, are considered threatened by Brazil's Ministry of the Environment. The current conservation status of S. gnomus is unclear, as the only known locality in Venezuela's lower Caroní basin has been flooded by a dam.

== Appearance and behavior ==
They have a relatively long, downwards-pointed and tube-like snout. The adult males of some species have distinct teeth on the outside of the lower jaw, likely used in confrontations with other males. The largest species reach up to 60 cm (2 ft) in total length, but most are less than half that size and the smallest only reach about 15 cm (1/2 ft). Several species are only known from museum specimens and consequently their living colors are unknown. Where known, the species are generally medium to dark brownish or grayish. They are often darker on the upper part than the lower and some have a pale line on the top of the head, but otherwise they are quite uniformly colored without conspicuous patters. However, at least one species, S. cramptoni, is overall whitish-pink, similar to some other knifefish like Compsaraia and Orthosternarchus that inhabit deep, dark rivers.

Very little is known about their behavior, but limited aquarium observations indicate that at least S. goeldii is nocturnal. They feed on invertebrates.

== Species ==
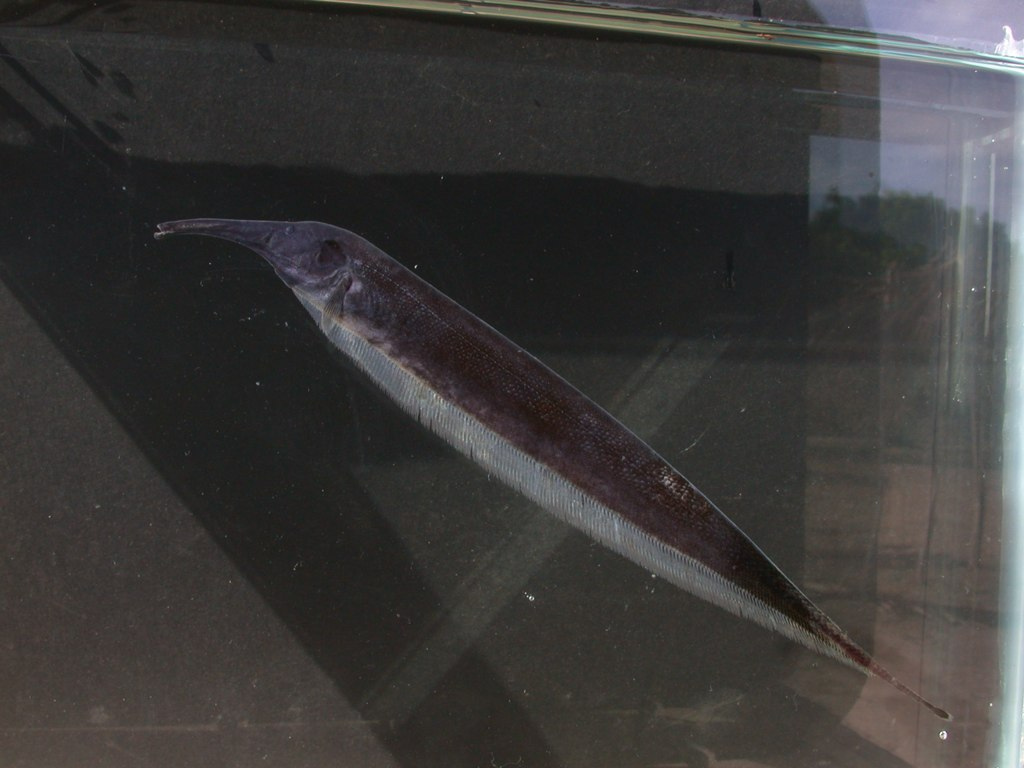
Sternarchorhynchus in an aquarium

There are currently 32 described species in this genus. Additionally, a few undescribed species are known.

- Sternarchorhynchus axelrodi de Santana & Vari, 2010 (Axelrod's tube-snouted ghost knifefish)
- Sternarchorhynchus britskii Campos-da-Paz, 2000 (Britski's tube-snouted ghost knifefish)
- Sternarchorhynchus caboclo de Santana & Nogueira, 2006 (Cabocolo tube-snouted ghost knifefish )
- Sternarchorhynchus chaoi de Santana & Vari, 2010 (Chao's tube-snouted ghost knifefish)
- Sternarchorhynchus cramptoni de Santana & Vari, 2010 (Crampton's tube-snouted ghost knifefish)
- Sternarchorhynchus curumim de Santana & Crampton, 2006 (Curumim tube-snouted ghost knifefish)
- Sternarchorhynchus curvirostris (Boulenger, 1887)
- Sternarchorhynchus freemani de Santana & Vari, 2010 (Freeman's tube-snouted ghost knifefish)
- Sternarchorhynchus galibi de Santana & Vari, 2010 (Galibi tube-snouted ghost knifefish)
- Sternarchorhynchus gnomus de Santana & Taphorn, 2006 (Gnomus tube-snouted ghost knifefish)
- Sternarchorhynchus goeldii de Santana & Vari, 2010 (Goeldi's tube-snouted ghost knifefish)
- Sternarchorhynchus hagedornae de Santana & Vari, 2010 (Hagedorn's tube-snouted ghost knifefish)
- Sternarchorhynchus higuchii de Santana & Vari, 2010 (Higuchi's tube-snouted ghost knifefish)
- Sternarchorhynchus inpai de Santana & Vari, 2010 (Inpa tube-snouted ghost knifefish)
- Sternarchorhynchus jaimei de Santana & Vari, 2010 (Jamei's tube-snouted ghost knifefish)
- Sternarchorhynchus kokraimoro de Santana & Vari, 2010 (Kokraimoro tube-snouted ghost knifefish)
- Sternarchorhynchus mareikeae de Santana & Vari, 2010 (Mareike's tube-snouted ghost knifefish)
- Sternarchorhynchus marreroi de Santana & Vari, 2010 (Marrero's tube-snouted ghost knifefish)
- Sternarchorhynchus mendesi de Santana & Vari, 2010 (Mendes’ tube-snouted ghost knifefish)
- Sternarchorhynchus mesensis Campos-da-Paz, 2000 (Mesensis tube-snouted ghost knifefish)
- Sternarchorhynchus montanus de Santana & Vari, 2010 (Montane tube-snouted ghost knifefish )
- Sternarchorhynchus mormyrus (Steindachner, 1868)
- Sternarchorhynchus oxyrhynchus (J. P. Müller & Troschel, 1849)
- Sternarchorhynchus retzeri de Santana & Vari, 2010 (Retzer's tube-snouted ghost knifefish)
- Sternarchorhynchus roseni Mago-Leccia, 1994 (Rosen's tube-snouted ghost knifefish)
- Sternarchorhynchus schwassmanni de Santana & Vari, 2010
- Sternarchorhynchus severii de Santana & Nogueira, 2006 (Severi's tube-snouted ghost knifefish)
- Sternarchorhynchus starksi de Santana & Vari, 2010 (Stark's tube-snouted ghost knifefish)
- Sternarchorhynchus stewarti de Santana & Vari, 2010 (Stewart's tube-snouted ghost knifefish)
- Sternarchorhynchus taphorni de Santana & Vari, 2010 (Taphorn's tube-snouted ghost knifefish)
- Sternarchorhynchus villasboasi de Santana & Vari, 2010 (Villasboas’ tube-snouted ghost knifefish)
- Sternarchorhynchus yepezi de Santana & Vari, 2010 (Yepez’ tube-snouted ghost knifefish)
