= Sternarchogiton labiatus =

Conservation status
- Least Concern (IUCN 3.1)

Scientific classification
- Kingdom: Animalia
- Phylum: Chordata
- Class: Actinopterygii
- Order: Gymnotiformes
- Family: Apteronotidae
- Genus: Sternarchogiton
- Species: S. labiatus

Binomial name
- Sternarchogiton labiatus de Santana & Crampton, 2007

Species of fish

Sternarchogiton labiatus is a species of weakly electric knifefish in the family Apteronotidae. Its species name labiatus comes from the Latin labium, meaning "lip", referring to a distinctive three-lobed structure on its lower lips. S. labiatus is only known from the Tefé River, at a depth of 6–14 m (20–46 ft), and from the lower Rio Negro, in the Amazon River basin. They have been captured from both whitewater and blackwater habitats. It is also present in the Orinoco river system in Venezuela.

S. labiatus has a laterally compressed, knife-shaped body with a nearly straight dorsal profile and a long anal fin. The head is laterally compressed, with a curved dorsal profile and small eyes that are covered by a thin membrane. The mouth is terminal, with a three-lobed rigid structure consisting of a pair of smooth, hard, bulbous swellings along the lower lip and a medial spur that projects down and forward. The lower jaw is longer than deep, bearing two rows of conical teeth numbering 17 plus 4 replacements each. There are upper and lower pharyngeal tooth plates with 5-6 and 8-9 teeth respectively. There is no sexual dimorphism in the cranium or the three-lobed structure.

The pectoral fins are broad and pointed, with 12-14 rays. The anal fin rays number 156-168. The tail is compressed and moderately long, with a small lanceolate caudal fin containing 15-16 rays. The coloration is dark brown, becoming darker on the back and head. Brown chromatophores are lightly speckled on the pterygiophores (supporting bones) of the anal fin. The pectoral fins are hyaline with dark tips, the anal fin is hyaline with a scattering of light brown chromatophores and a slightly darkened margin, and the caudal fin is very dark brown to black. S. labiatus grows to about 21 cm (8 in).

The structure on the lower lip of S. labiatus has been speculated to function in electroreception for locating prey. Like other apteronotids, these fish generate a continuous weak electric field for the purposes of electrolocation and communication. The electric organ discharge (EOD) of S. labiatus has a fundamental frequency of 1160-1587 Hz and two phases; there is no known sexual dimorphism in waveform or frequency. Reproduction is believed to occur after the onset of the rising water period in October.
