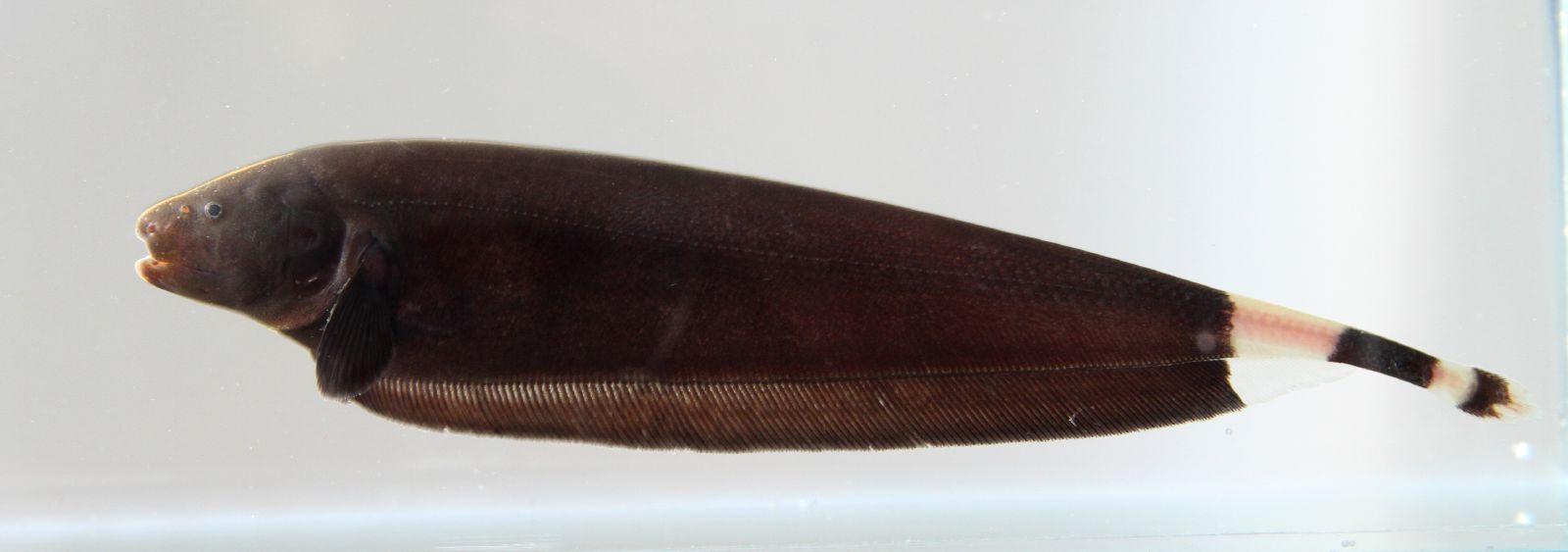

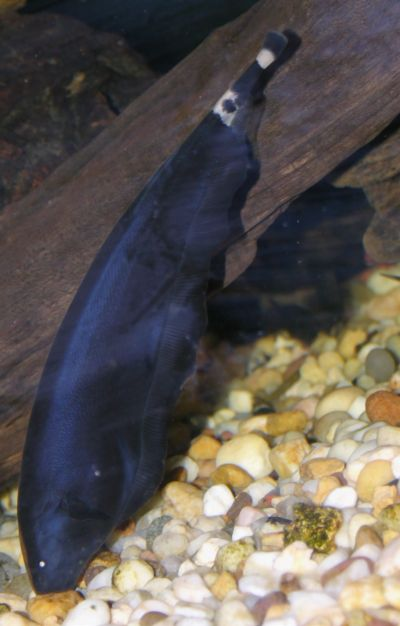

Conservation status
- Least Concern (IUCN 3.1)

Scientific classification
- Kingdom: Animalia
- Phylum: Chordata
- Class: Actinopterygii
- Division: Teleostei
- Order: Gymnotiformes
- Family: Apteronotidae
- Genus: Apteronotus
- Species: A. albifrons

Binomial name
- Apteronotus albifrons (Linnaeus, 1766)

Synonyms
- Gymnotus albifrons Linnaeus, 1766; Apteronotus passan Lacépède, 1800; Sternarchus lacepedii Castelnau, 1855; Sternarchus maximilliani Castelnau, 1855

= Black ghost knifefish =

Species of fish

The black ghost knifefish (Apteronotus albifrons) is a tropical ornamental fish belonging to the ghost knifefish family (Apteronotidae). They originate in freshwater habitats in South America where they range from Venezuela to the Paraguay–Paraná River, including the Amazon Basin. They are popular in aquaria. The fish is all black except for two white rings on its tail, and a white blaze on its nose, which can occasionally extend into a stripe down its back. It moves mainly by undulating a long fin on its underside. It will grow to a length of 45–50 centimetres (18–20 in).

Black ghost knifefish are nocturnal. They are a weakly electric fish which use an electric organ and receptors distributed over the length of their body in order to locate prey, including insect larvae.

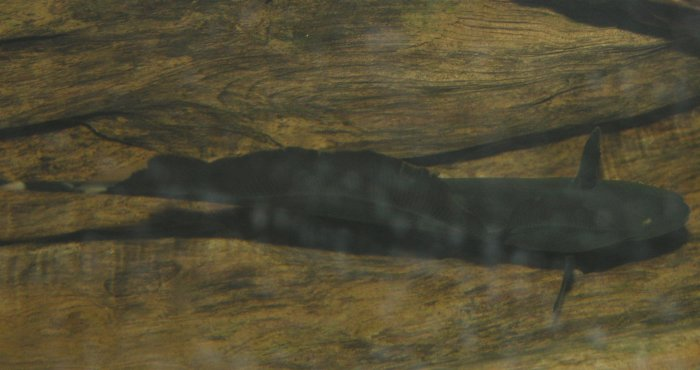
Black ghost knifefish with its underside pointing towards the camera

== Description ==
The black ghost knifefish has an elongate compressed body with a finless back, short snout, large mouth and a long fin along its abdomen. This fin is a long fused ventral and anal fin as these fish typically have an absent caudal fin. It has cycloid scales. Adults can reach mature lengths of 45–50 cm (18–20 in). Its body is entirely black, save for two white bands circling the body: one near its caudal fin and the other near its anal fin. It may also have a white band extending from the snout to the top of its head. Pale bands on the tail are a synapomorphy for its monophyletic clade. The presence of these two semi-clear bands encircle the caudal end of the fish throughout its development, clearly signifying the A. albifrons species complex. The black ghost knifefish is benthopelagic, so they live in the water column and the bottom of bodies of water.

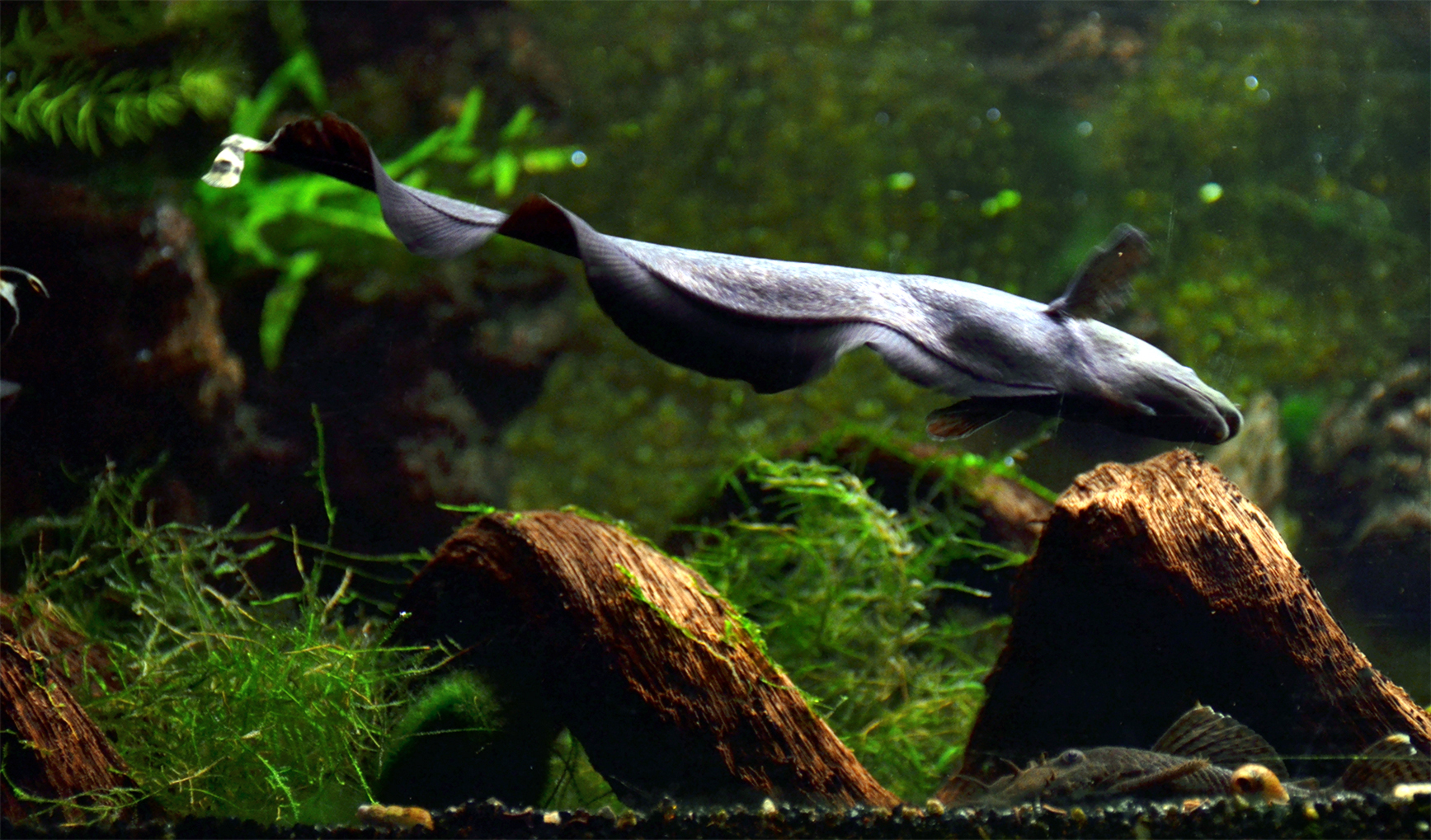
Black ghost knifefish from another underside view to show the undulating movement of the large extended dorsal/caudal fin

== Systematics ==
The first recorded species of the Gymnotidae family is the Gymnotus carapo in Brazil discovered by Georg Maregraf in 1648. The black ghost knifefish was then first recorded in 1766 by Carl Linnaeus.

The black ghost knifefish is of the order Gymnotiformes, which are known for being able to generate electric fields used for sensing the environment and communication with other fish. More specifically, it belongs to the family Apteronotidae, which have the most number of current species (96) in the Gymnotiformes order. Apteronotus albifrons is the sister taxa to Parapteronotus.

== Electricity ==
The black ghost knifefish is a weakly electric fish as a result of the electromotor and electrosensory systems it possesses. While some fish can only receive electric signals, the black ghost knifefish can both produce and sense the electrical impulses. Electrogenesis occurs when a specialized electric organ found in the tail of the fish generates electrical signals, which are thus called electric organ discharges (EODs). Then, for these EODs to be sensed by the fish, electroreception occurs when groups of sensory cells embedded in the skin, known as electroreceptor organs, detect the electrical change. The EODs are used for two major purposes: electrolocation and communication.

The kind of EOD produced can be used to distinguish between two types of weakly electric fish: the pulse-type and the wave-type. The black ghost knifefish are considered to be the latter type, because they can continuously generate EODs in small intervals. Wave-type EODs have a narrow power spectra, and can be heard as a tonal sound, where the discharge rate establishes the fundamental frequency. By emitting its own continuous sinusoidal train of EODs, the fish can determine the presence of nearby objects by sensing perturbations in timing and amplitude of electric fields, an ability known as active electrolocation. The particular organs used to sense the self-generated high-frequency EODs are tuberous electroreceptor organs. On the other hand, when low-frequency electric fields are generated by external sources instead of the fish itself, a different class of electroreceptor organs is used for this passive electrolocation, called ampullary organs. Therefore, the black ghost knifefish uses an active and a passive electrosystem, each with its own corresponding receptor organs. The fish can also use a mechanosensory lateral line system, which detects water disturbances created by the motion of the fish's body. As nocturnal hunters, the fish can rely on all three systems to navigate through dark environments and detect their prey.

Each species has a characteristic EOD baseline frequency range, which varies with sex and age within the species, as well. It was found that the black ghost knifefish that originated from the Orinoco were extremely sexually dimorphic in EODs. Females would have much higher EOD's than males. However black ghosts that originated from the Amazon were significantly less sexually dimorphic in EOD's. The baseline frequency is maintained to be almost constant at stable temperature, but will usually be changed due to the presence of others of the same species. Such changes in frequency relevant to social interaction are called frequency modulations (FMs). The role these FMs have in communication is significant, as black ghost knifefish have developed jamming avoidance responses, which are behavioral responses that avoid the overlapping of EOD frequencies between conspecific individuals to prevent sensory confusion. Moreover, a study was conducted that focused on sexual dimorphism in electrocommunication signals. Female black ghost knifefish generate EODs at a higher frequency than the males, an FM which can be used for gender recognition. A study found the subordinate black ghost knifefish exhibited noticeable gradual frequency rises (GFRs) in their EODs whereas the dominant fish did not, supporting the researchers' hypothesis that GFRs during communication are indicative of submissive signals.

== Locomotion ==
The black ghost knifefish propels itself by sending waves along a long anal fin attached to the midline on the ventral side of the fish. Undulating dorsal or anal fins are a common mode of swimming among fish that has evolved independently in multiple teleost fish. This undulating motion is useful for swimming with little to no bending of the body and allows for reversing swimming direction and speed in less than a second. Since the body remains mostly rigid, their swimming motion is described to be "knife-like" as they look as if they are slicing through the water. This ribbon-fin locomotion likely evolved to allow specialization in fish for higher maneuverability. This unusual locomotive system gives the fish the ability to swim in all directions (forwards, backwards, and sideways) and also hover. They can even swim upside down.

== Diet ==
The black ghost knifefish is considered one of the large-mouthed species of the Apteronotidae family and has been observed eating other smaller fish and shrimp. They are carnivores and hunt during the night. Their diet mainly consists of insect larvae, small crustaceans, and smaller fish. Black ghost knifefish use their electrosensory systems to hunt in the dark of night and in turbid muddy water. Their high maneuverability allows for excellent foraging in cluttered environments. Prey is often captured with a short but quick lunge. Some predatory fish will prey on the black ghost knifefish in the wild and will result in lots of damage on the caudal end of the bodies of wild knifefish. As a response to this pressure, gymnotiforms have evolved the ability to regenerate tails and parts of the caudal spinal cord with efficiency.

== Life history ==
In regards to reproduction, members of the gymnotiform order are fractional spawners, so the black ghost knifefish spawn their sticky eggs irregularly, as the number of eggs spawned is not consistent every time. Their fecundity can range from 1 to 105 eggs. They also choose spawning sites carefully to ensure well-hidden eggs. The Apteronotus species will hide eggs one at a time in tiny holes or gaps in the environment. Eggs are also deposited at night to early morning between 11 pm and 2 am using their electrosensory object location abilities. Juvenile black knife ghostfish often reach the minimum size of maturity when they are around 1 year old or even earlier. Research is limited on reproduction of Apteronotus albifrons, but it has been shown that they share many similarities with Apteronotus leptorhynchus. The juveniles are shown to have a larger head than their adult counterparts. Apteronotus also seem to have a larger yolk sac than other species in their order. Gonad maturation can be induced by decreasing the conductivity of and increasing the height level of water they reside in. The black ghost knifefish will choose a single male to spawn. If there is more than one male, a rivalry will occur while the males compete by driving away other males aggressively.

== Distribution ==
The black ghost knifefish is distributed in the river systems and small creeks of South America, including the Orinoco, Guianas, the Amazon, Ucayale, Rio Paraguay, and Rio Parana. Some native-given names of this fish are "Cheeogaa" and "Tovira cavallo". They are often regarded as the most widespread apteronotid species, and can be seen from Ecuador to Brazil.

== Importance to humans ==
The black ghost knifefish has a low 2n (diploid chromosome number) of 24 and different groups of chromosome types, making it a useful model aquatic vertebrate for experimental studies on drug effects, pollutant effects, and other environmental agents. This is one of the lowest diploid chromosome numbers reported for teleost fish, further emphasizing this species importance as a bioassay animal. This fish is useful in inspiring new designs for underwater vehicles due to their high maneuverability while maintaining a straight and rigid body. The black ghost knifefish is mostly considered ornamental, and is widely cultivated as ornamental fish in Indonesia, and extremely popular in aquaria. Natives of South America regard the black ghost knifefish with superstition, believing it is inhabited by a ghost of the departed or evil spirits.

== Conservation status and efforts ==
The black ghost knifefish has been listed as Least Concern on the IUCN Red list since 2020. However, the ornamental fish market demand is high, and with black ghost knifefish being a popular ornamental fish in aquaria, many are often taken straight from their natural habitats. Around half of the ornamental fish taken from their natural habitats in the Amazons are not included in official export registers. Intensive fishing is very capable of causing commercial extinction of these fish among others in the near future. Some conservation efforts include improved techniques in fish care and aquaria, environmental education in public aquariums, and overall collaboration between government and fishing industries. Bringing awareness to the public and ecotourism can promote conservation of endangered species and not yet endangered species to maintain biodiversity in these biological hotspots.
