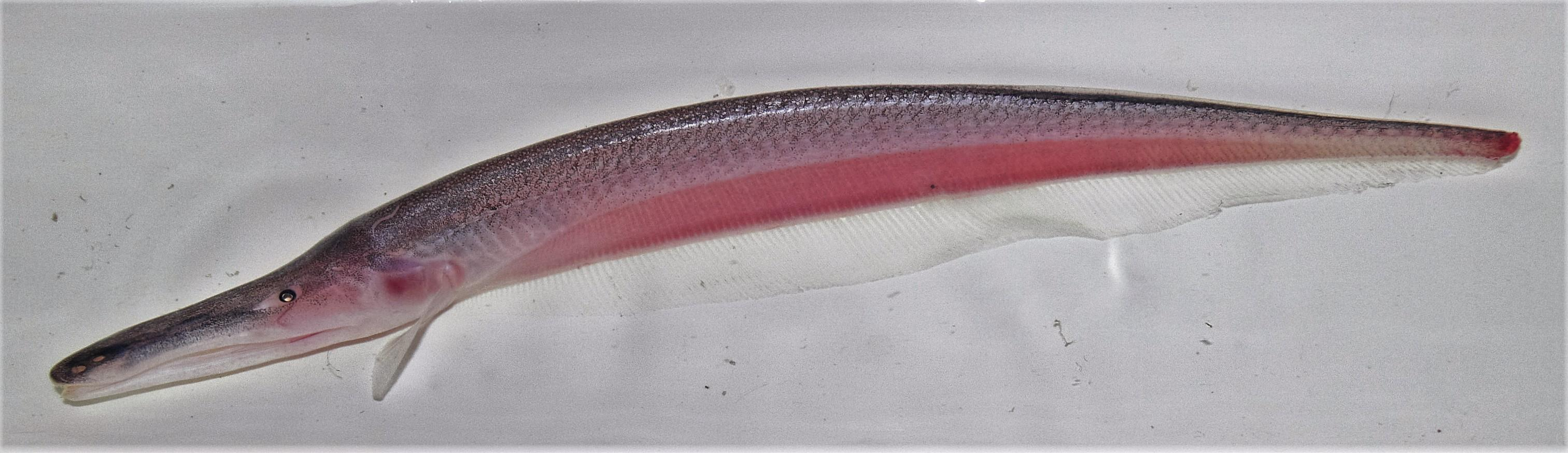
- Male specimen with elongated jaws

Conservation status
- Least Concern (IUCN 3.1)

Scientific classification
- Kingdom: Animalia
- Phylum: Chordata
- Class: Actinopterygii
- Order: Gymnotiformes
- Family: Apteronotidae
- Genus: Compsaraia
- Species: C. samueli

Binomial name
- Compsaraia samueli Albert & Crampton, 2009

= Compsaraia samueli =

Species of fish

Compsaraia samueli, the pelican knifefish, is a species of apteronotid knifefish from the western Amazon basin of Brazil and Peru. Like other gymnotiform knifefish, it is an electric fish. It exhibits pronounced sexual dimorphism in which mature males develop extremely elongated snouts and jaws. This phenotype is found in several other apteronotid species and is used in agonistic jaw-locking behaviors between males.

A study comparing skull shape and jaw-closing performance in males and females of Compsaraia samueli suggested that males with elongated faces for use in fights also had lower mechanical advantages, indicating a trade-off between sexual weaponry and jaw leverage.

Named in honor of the senior author's father, Samuel Albert, who accompanied his son on an electric-fish collecting trip to Peru, and purchased type specimens from a fish market near Iquitos when he recognized that they differed from all the other electric fishes they had been collecting by the prominent elongate jaws of mature males.
