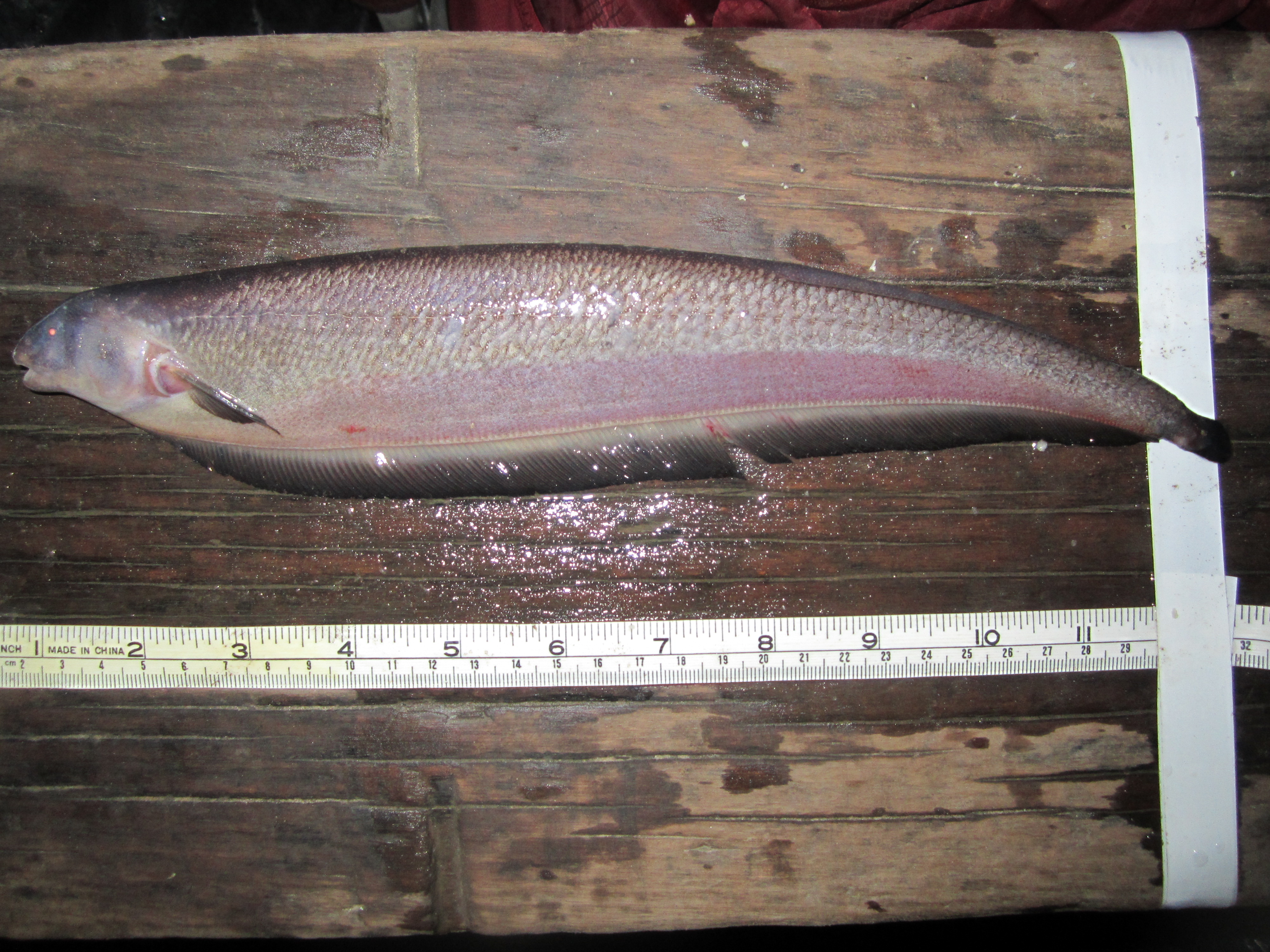

Conservation status
- Least Concern (IUCN 3.1)

Scientific classification
- Kingdom: Animalia
- Phylum: Chordata
- Class: Actinopterygii
- Order: Gymnotiformes
- Family: Apteronotidae
- Subfamily: Apteronotinae
- Genus: Tenebrosternarchus; Bernt, Fronk, Evans & Albert, 2020
- Species: T. preto

Binomial name
- Tenebrosternarchus preto (de Santana & Crampton, 2007)

Synonyms
- Sternarchogiton preto de Santana & Crampton, 2007

= Tenebrosternarchus =

Species of fish

Tenebrosternarchus is a monospecific genus of weakly electric knifefish in the family Apteronotidae. The only species in the genus is Tenebrosternarchus preto. It is native to large river channels and major side branches in the Amazon Basin, and is common in the Tefé River and the Rio Solimões to a depth of 14 m (46 ft). It is found in both whitewater and blackwater habitats. The species name preto comes from the Portuguese word for "black", referring to its coloration. Prior to 2020, it was placed in the genus Sternarchogiton.

As its scientific name suggests, it can be distinguished by its entirely dark brown to purplish black color. The fins have hyaline rays and dark brown membranes. The body is a laterally compressed and knife-shaped, with a nearly straight dorsal profile. The head is laterally compressed with a convex dorsal profile and small eyes that are covered by a membrane. Unlike Sternarchogiton species it has long, conical teeth (numbering 5 plus 2-3 replacements) on the premaxillary of the upper jaw; there is one row of teeth (numbering 10 plus 3 replacements) on the dentary bone of the lower jaw. Both upper and lower pharyngeal tooth plates are present, bearing 6 and 4-5 teeth respectively.

The long anal fin contains 189-210 soft rays. The pectoral fins are broad and pointed, with 12-14 rays. The tail is frequently missing or regenerated; when intact it is compressed and short, with a small lanceolate caudal fin containing 13-20 rays. The origin of the whip-like dorsal electroreceptive appendage is in the latter half of the body. There are 5-8 rows of scales above the lateral line. There is no sexual dimorphism in morphology or pigmentation. T. preto grows to about 30 cm (12 in) long.

As in other apteronotids, T. preto generates a continuous, weak electric field for electrolocation and communication. This electric organ discharge (EOD) has a fundamental frequency of 1266–1922 Hz and 2 phases. There is no obvious sexual dimorphism in frequency or waveform. Reproduction is believed to occur early in the rising water period, with individuals in breeding condition in October. Juveniles have been caught in floating meadows alongside the Tefé River throughout the flooding season (December to April).
