= Porotergus =

Scientific classification
- Kingdom: Animalia
- Phylum: Chordata
- Class: Actinopterygii
- Order: Gymnotiformes
- Family: Apteronotidae
- Subfamily: Apteronotinae
- Genus: Porotergus; M. M. Ellis in C. H. Eigenmann, 1912

Type species
- Porotergus gymnotus M. M. Ellis, 1912

Genus of fishes

Porotergus is a genus of ghost knifefishes found in the Amazon and Essequibo basins in tropical South America. They are found over sandy bottoms in shallow (P. gymnotus) or deep rivers (two remaining). They feed on small aquatic insect larvae. They have a stubby snout and are fairly small knifefish, with the largest species reaching up to 27 cm (11 in) in total length.

== Species ==
There are currently three described species in this genus:

- Porotergus duende de Santana & Crampton, 2010
- Porotergus gimbeli M. M. Ellis, 1912, named for Jacob Gimbel, who financed the expedition on which it was discovered. P. gimbeli is depicted on a brass plaque appearing on the base of a flagpole which Gimbel later donated to UCLA.
- Porotergus gymnotus M. M. Ellis, 1912
- Porotergus sambaibensis
