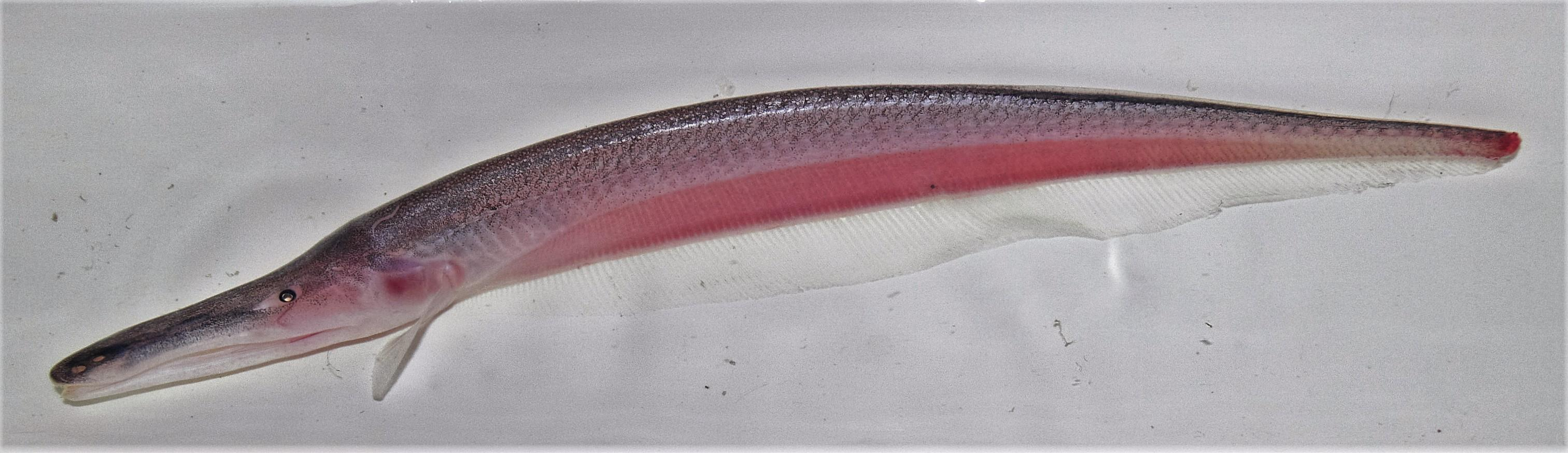
- Compsaraia samueli

Scientific classification
- Kingdom: Animalia
- Phylum: Chordata
- Class: Actinopterygii
- Division: Teleostei
- Order: Gymnotiformes
- Family: Apteronotidae
- Subfamily: Apteronotinae
- Genus: Compsaraia; Albert, 2001

Type species
- Porotergus compsus Mago-Leccia, 1994

= Compsaraia =

Genus of fishes

Compsaraia is a genus of ghost knifefishes found in tropical South America. There are currently three described species in this genus. They are found deep in large rivers in the Amazon and Orinoco basins, and have small eyes and little pigment (appearing whitish or pink in colour).

== Species ==
There are three species:

- Compsaraia compsa (Mago-Leccia, 1994)
- Compsaraia iara Bernt & Albert, 2017
- Compsaraia samueli Albert & Crampton, 2009
