= Apteronotus magdalenensis =

Scientific classification
- Kingdom: Animalia
- Phylum: Chordata
- Class: Actinopterygii
- Order: Gymnotiformes
- Family: Apteronotidae
- Genus: Apteronotus
- Species: A. magdalenensis

Binomial name
- Apteronotus magdalenensis (Miles, 1945)

Synonyms
- Ubidia magdalenensis Miles, 1945 (basionym)

Species of knifefish

Apteronotus magdalenensis is a species of ghost knifefish (Apteronotidae) endemic to Colombia. The species was initially placed in the newly described genus Ubidia, of which it was the type species, but was subsequently moved to Apteronotus.

Though often reported to be 1.3 m (4 ft 3 in) long (specifically, 1,294 mm (50.9 in) long), this appears to stem from a misidentification of Sternopygus aequilabiatus; A. magdalenensis is actually much smaller, commonly around 30 cm (12 in) in total length, and the largest male specimens being 449 mm (17.7 in) long.

The species is only found in the Rio Magdalena-Cauca basin, inhabiting river stretches with sandy to rocky substrate and turbidity from heavy sediment load. Like all gymnotiformes, this species is an electric fish; they produce a continuous-wave electric organ discharge (EOD) that are used to detect their prey, being the larvae of aquatic insects.
