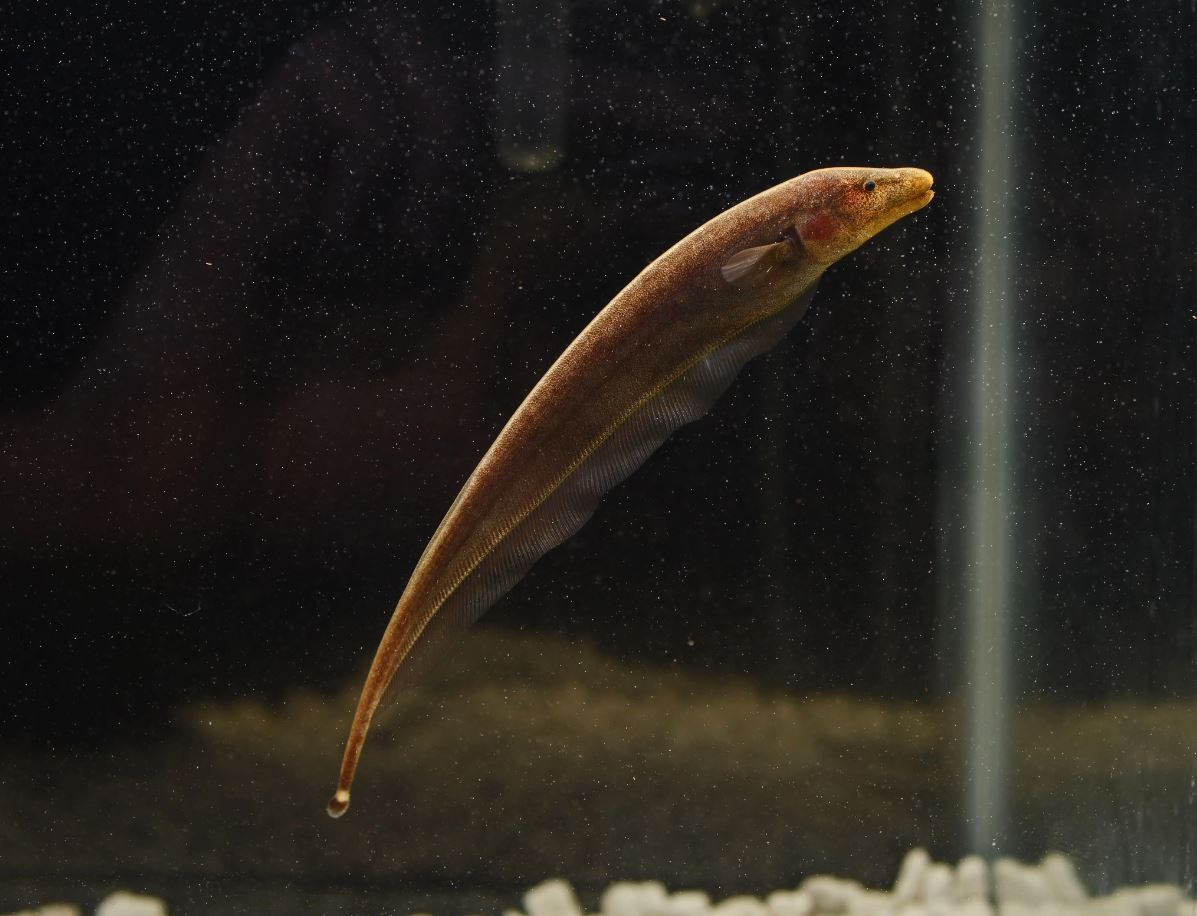

Conservation status
- Endangered (IUCN 3.1)

Scientific classification
- Kingdom: Animalia
- Phylum: Chordata
- Class: Actinopterygii
- Division: Teleostei
- Order: Gymnotiformes
- Family: Apteronotidae
- Genus: Apteronotus
- Species: A. leptorhynchus

Binomial name
- Apteronotus leptorhynchus (M. M. Ellis, 1912)

Synonyms
- Sternarchus leptorhynchus M. M. Ellis, 1912

= Brown ghost knifefish =

Species of fish

The brown ghost knifefish (Apteronotus leptorhynchus) is a species of weakly electric knifefish in the family Apteronotidae. The brown ghost knifefish is the only vertebrate proven to have negligible brain aging thus far. As such, they are extensively researched as a model species for neurological and developmental studies. In the wild, A. leptorhynchus is understudied known only to inhabit deep channels of large, lowland rivers, specifically the Essequibo River drainage in Guyana, where it is active nocturnally and seeks vegetated retreat sites during the day. They are listed as an endangered species by the ICUN.

== Taxonomy ==
Apteronotus leptorhynchus is a ray-finned fish belonging to the Neotropical knifefish order Gymnotiformes. Brown ghost knifefish are within the Apteronotidae family, which are distinguished from other Gymnotiforms by the presence of a caudal tail.

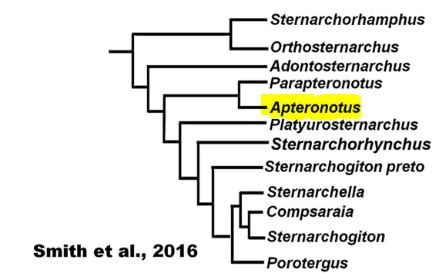
Phylogenetic tree of the family Apteronotidae with the genus Apteronotus highlighted

The clade to which A. leptorhynchus belongs, historically named A. leptorhynchus and thought to be monophyletic, was recently split into nine separate species native to tropical South America. All species within this clade are similar in morphology and osteology, likely due to extreme morphological convergence within similarly structured riparian habitats. The remaining species of Apteronotus leptorhynchus was redefined to a genetically and geographically isolated population inhabiting the Essequibo River and its drainage basin.

== Description ==
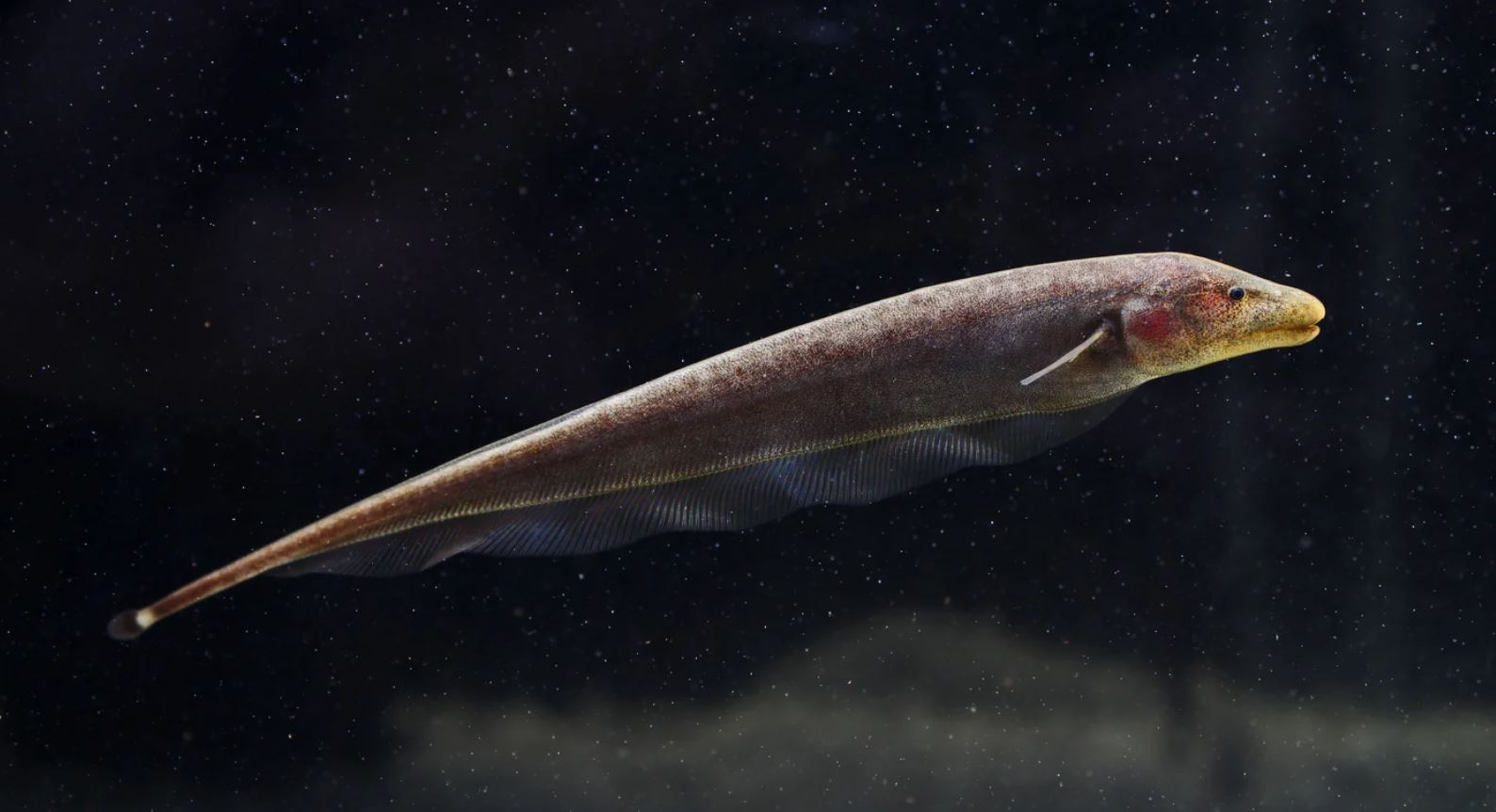
The ribbon-like anal fin of the brown ghost knifefish (Apteronotus leptorhynchus) extends along the ventral side and aids in locomotion

As a member of the family Apteronotidae, brown ghost knifefish are laterally compressed and sport a long, posteriorly tapered body form. They lack pelvic and dorsal fins, yet retain a pointed pectoral fin and a greatly reduced caudal tail, an identifying trait of Apteronotids among the Gymnotiforms. Brown ghost knifefish possess an elongated, ribbon-like anal fin which extends along the majority of its ventral side. This fin comprises around one hundred and fifty fin rays and is utilized as the species' main source of locomotion. Among teleost fishes, this species has relatively restricted gill openings. Brown ghost knifefish have a laterally compressed head, a terminal mouth, and small, laterally located eyes covered by a thin membrane. The urogenital papilla and anus are located beneath the head, posterior to the eyes. Generally, they possess 17–18 pectoral-fin rays, 151–156 anal-fin rays, 17–21 caudal-fin rays, 78–82 scales along the lateral line, 18 precaudal vertebrae, and 78–81 total vertebrae. Among collected individuals, brown ghost knifefish range in total length between 93.1 and 260.0 mm. Tail length ranges from 13.0 to 20.7 mm. Head length ranges from 15.0 to 46.7 mm.

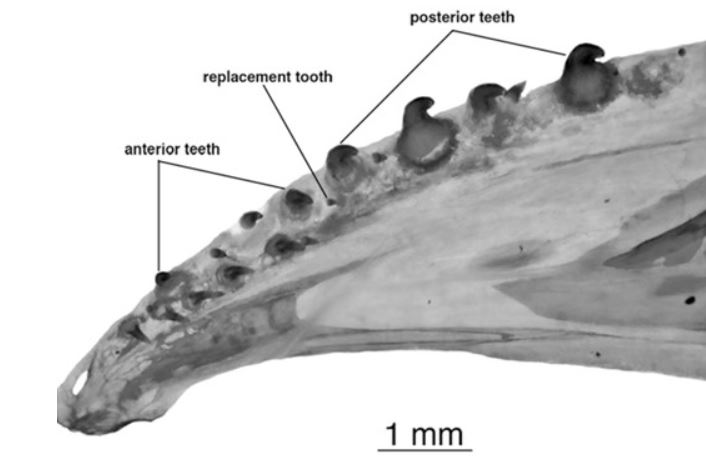
Dentary bone of the brown ghost knifefish; the posterior teeth are twice the size of the anterior teeth

Brown ghost knifefish can be distinguished from other genera within the family Apteronotidae based on a multitude of distinct synapomorphies. Brown ghost knifefish can be identified externally by the pale median stripe running longitudinally from the chin through the dorsal half of the fish. Their teeth are also distinct in that the posterior teeth of the dentary bone are twice the size of the anterior teeth. Less conspicuous identifiers of brown ghost knifefish include the notable elongation and anterior positioning of some cranial bones, including the anguloarticular, endopterygoid, and quadrate bones.

There are few inconspicuous, yet observable, traits that distinguish A. leptorhynchus from other members of the Apteronotus genus. Among Apteronotus, the number and morphology of the infraorbital ossifications is variable. A. leptorhynchus is distinct in the tubular form of its fifth infraorbital.

When preserved in alcohol, the body and head of brown ghost knifefish are light to dark brown in coloration. The anal and pectoral fins are dark brown and encircled by translucent membrane bands. The caudal fin is encircled by a pale band at the base and is dark brown posteriorly. A prominent pale band runs laterally along the dorsal midsection of the body.

== Geographic distribution ==
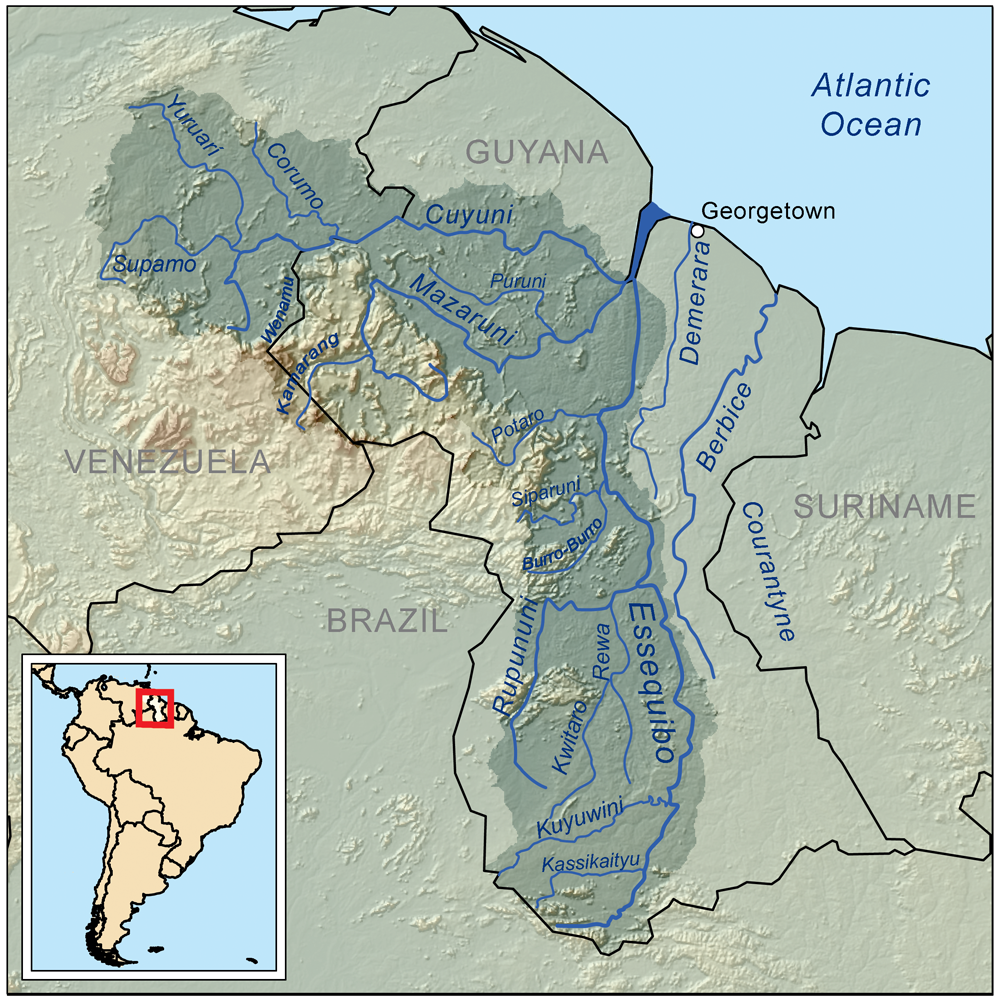
Brown ghost knifefish inhabit the Essequibo River and its drainage basin

The brown ghost knifefish is endemic to the Essequibo River and its drainage basin in Guyana. Historically, this fish was thought to inhabit broad regions of northern South America, including the Pacific and Caribbean drainages of Colombia, Venezuela, and Peru. These populations were either misidentified or now belong to newly described, distinct species.

== Ecology and habitat preference ==
Within the Essequibo River and its drainage basin, brown ghost knifefish prefer deep channels where limited light can reach. They are active nocturnally and move from deep waters to the shore during dark hours. During the day, they seek refuge among roots and under logs to avoid diurnal predators. Intraspecific competition among shelter sites is determined by dominance hierarchies. These hierarchies are influenced by the size and electric signal intensity of males. Males take shelter alone while female fish group together within retreat sites.

Electric organ discharges (EOD) are frequently produced by brown ghost knifefish, serving a variety of functions including prey capture, navigation, and social dominance. Six distinct signal types have been observed, the most common being short, low frequency "chirps". Chirp production is dependent on the close proximity between individual brown ghost knifefish. Individuals relay an "echo" signal in response to these hardly detectable chirps, indicating a substantially high sensitivity to electrocommunication within this species. Signals increase in frequency as individuals approach or are approached by a focal target. EODs do not seem to incur a significant metabolic costs when in oxygen-abundant conditions. In hypoxic environments however, brown ghost knifefish reduce the amplitude of EODs to maintain a healthy metabolic rate.

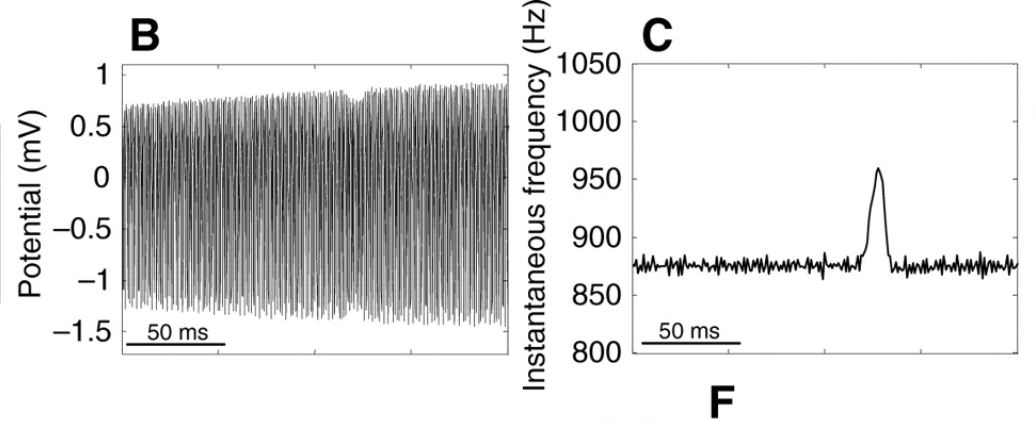
Frequency-time chart and oscillogram of a brown ghost knifefish's "chirp" signal

Electrocommunication appears to serve different functions between male and female brown ghost knifefish. Among males, electric signals are intense and pronounced, utilized to establish social dominance and access to higher quality resources. During contact between males, aggressive signals characterized as abrupt frequency rises are sent to battle over dominance. Even amongst females, short rises in electric signals serve an aggressive intrasexual function. Long rises, conversely, serve an intersexual role and act as an advertisement of reproductive condition or status towards potential mates.

== Diet ==
Based on diet analysis of closely related and morphologically similar species, brown ghost knifefish likely feed on benthic invertebrates, shrimp, and small fish.

== Use in research ==
Due to their capacity to produce electric signals and their unique lack of brain senescence, brown ghost knifefish are heavily researched in the fields of electrocommunication neuroethology. Many research projects focused on the use of electric signals in this species have shed light on their natural behaviors and the functions of electric communication in similarly electric species. This species has been extensively studied to understand cellular, molecular, and morphological mechanisms underlying adult neurogenesis and neuronal regeneration in both the brain and the spinal cord. Researchers aim to determine the specific genetic and osteological components that prevent brain senescence in this species. However, a complete genome of this fish has yet to be sequenced.

== In recreation ==
The brown ghost knifefish, along with the closely related black ghost knifefish, are popular aquarium pets and are readily available to purchase within the fish trade.

== Threats and Conservation ==
Because the brown ghost knifefish is not well-studied in its natural habitat, not much is known about the threats that impact its population. As such, it is unclear how this species is responding to most human impacts, such as habitat degradation or climate change. Commercially farmed catfish within the Essequibo River are a prominent predator of this species and represent a growing biotic threat. A. leptorhynchus is currently listed as an endangered species according to the ICUN.

== See also ==
- Electric fish
- Bioelectromagnetism
