= Apteronotus galvisi =

Conservation status
- Data Deficient (IUCN 3.1)

Scientific classification
- Kingdom: Animalia
- Phylum: Chordata
- Class: Actinopterygii
- Order: Gymnotiformes
- Family: Apteronotidae
- Genus: Apteronotus
- Species: A. galvisi

Binomial name
- Apteronotus galvisi de Santana, Maldenado-Ocampo & Crampton, 2007

Species of fish

Apteronotus galvisi is a species of ghost knifefish that was first described in a 2007 scientific paper. It is endemic to Colombia. It has a mostly brown body, with some areas of yellow or white.

Named in honor of Germán Galvis Vergara (Universidad Nacional de Colombia, Sede Bogotá).
