= Pariosternarchus =

Conservation status
- Least Concern (IUCN 3.1)

Scientific classification
- Kingdom: Animalia
- Phylum: Chordata
- Class: Actinopterygii
- Order: Gymnotiformes
- Family: Apteronotidae
- Subfamily: Apteronotinae
- Genus: Pariosternarchus; Albert & Crampton, 2006
- Species: P. amazonensis

Binomial name
- Pariosternarchus amazonensis Albert & Crampton, 2006
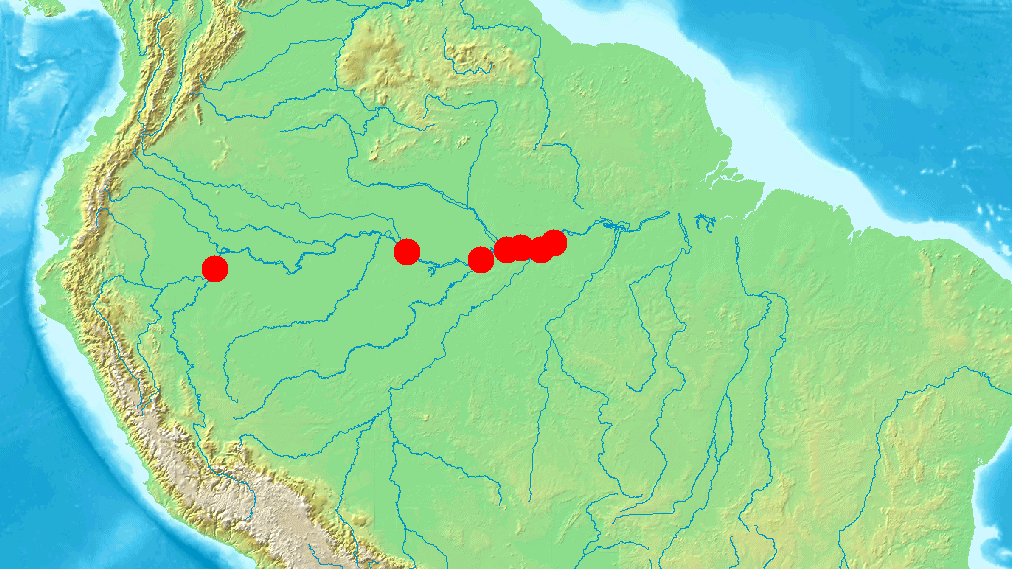
- Occurrences of P. amazonensis

Genus of fishes

Pariosternarchus is a monospecific genus of freshwater ray-finned fish belonging to the family Apteronotidae, the ghost knifefishes, the only species in the genus is Pariosternarchus amazonensis. It is found in the main channel of the Amazon River in Brazil and Peru, likely near the bottom in deep, fast-moving water. This species is characterized by a wide head with a flat bottom, and very large sensory canals along the lower jaw. Like several other knifefishes found in deep river channels, it has reduced eyes, scales, and body pigmentation.

== Taxonomy ==
Ichthyologists James S. Albert and William G.R. Crampton described P. amazonensis in 2006, in the scientific journal Ichthyological Exploration of Freshwaters; the type specimen is a 12.1 cm (4.8 in) long fish caught near the municipality of Alvarães in the Brazilian state of Amazonas. The authors coined for it the new genus Pariosternarchus, from the Greek pario ("cheek", referring to the wide head), and sternon + archos ("chest" + "rectum", a commonly used name for apteronotids that refers to the anterior position of the urogenital opening). From morphological similarities, P. amazonensis is thought to belong to the navajini, an informal taxonomic group of apteronotids adapted to fast-flowing, large rivers, with the genus Sternarchella being its closest relatives.

== Distribution and habitat ==
Pariosternarchus amazonensis occurs in the Amazon River, along the Rio Solimões in Brazil from the confluence of the Rio Japurá to the confluence of the Rio Madeira, and near the city of Iquitos in Peru. It can be found in deep river channels, flooded beaches, and the mouths of large whitewater tributaries.

== Description ==
Pariosternarchus amazonensis has a wide head, measuring up to a seventh as wide as long, with a completely flat ventral surface. The mouth is small and slung beneath the moderately long snout; conical teeth are present in both jaws. The sensory canals along the mandible are highly expanded. P. amazonensis is laterally compressed with a short body cavity. Like other members of its family, it has a long anal fin, a minute caudal fin, no pelvic or dorsal fins, and an electroreceptive dorsal appendage that originates about halfway along the back. There are 155–168 anal fin rays, 14–15 pectoral fin rays, and 16–17 caudal fin rays. The scales are large and diamond-shaped, with 6–8 rows above the lateral line but not reaching the upper surface of the head and body. Virtually unpigmented aside from tiny chromatophores speckling the bottom of the head and branchiostegal membranes, P. amazonensis is uniformly white-pink with translucent fins. The largest known specimen is 15.2 cm (6.0 in) long.

== Biology and ecology ==
The highly compressed form, small eyes, and reduced scales and coloration of P. amazonensis are consistent with living in deep (up to 25 m), fast-moving waters in large rivers. Its broad, flat-bottomed head and small, subterminal mouth suggest that it is a benthic forager. P. amazonensis is presumably capable of producing an electric field for electrolocation and communication like all other gymnotiforms, though its electric organ discharge (EOD) has not been described.

== Human interactions ==
The conservation status of P. amazonensis has been evaluated as Least Concern by the International Union for Conservation of Nature (IUCN).
