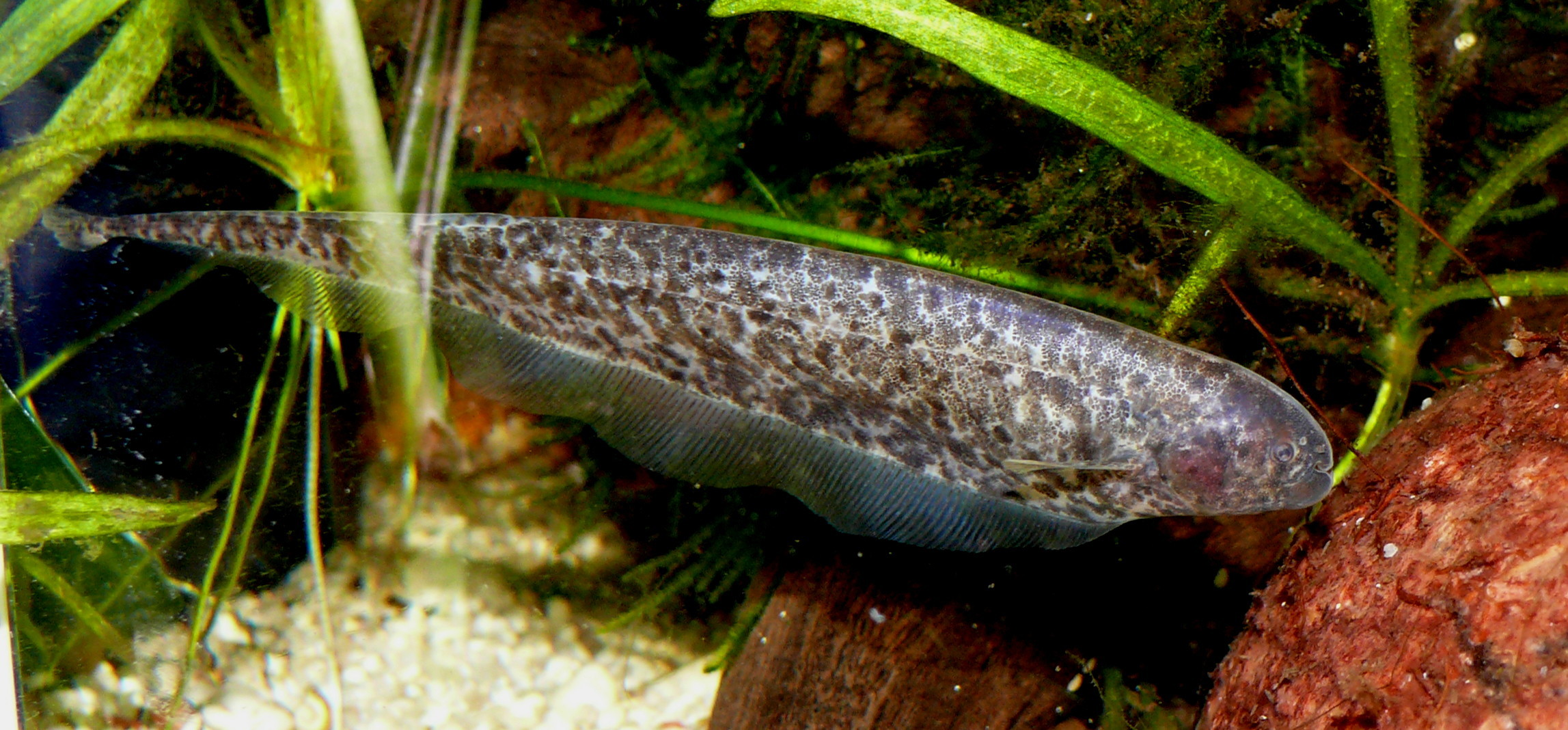
- Adontosternarchus clarkae

Scientific classification
- Kingdom: Animalia
- Phylum: Chordata
- Class: Actinopterygii
- Order: Gymnotiformes
- Family: Apteronotidae
- Subfamily: Apteronotinae
- Genus: Adontosternarchus; M. M. Ellis, 1912

Type species
- Sternarchus sachsi Peters, 1877

= Adontosternarchus =

Genus of fishes

Adontosternarchus is a genus of ghost knifefishes found in the Amazon and Orinoco river basins in tropical South America. They have blunt snouts, a dark-spotted or -mottled pattern on a pale background (however, spotting/mottling can be so dense that individuals appear almost all dark) and reach up to 18.5–32.2 cm (7.3–12.7 in) in total length. They feed on zooplankton and can be found quite deep, with A. devenanzii recorded down to 84 m (276 ft).

== Species ==
There are currently six recognized species in this genus:

- Adontosternarchus balaenops (Cope, 1878)
- Adontosternarchus clarkae Mago-Leccia, Lundberg & Baskin, 1985
- Adontosternarchus devenanzii Mago-Leccia, Lundberg & Baskin, 1985
- Adontosternarchus duartei de Santana & Vari, 2012
- Adontosternarchus nebulosus Lundberg & Cox Fernandes, 2007
- Adontosternarchus sachsi (W. K. H. Peters, 1877)
