= Megadontognathus =

Scientific classification
- Kingdom: Animalia
- Phylum: Chordata
- Class: Actinopterygii
- Order: Gymnotiformes
- Family: Apteronotidae
- Subfamily: Apteronotinae
- Genus: Megadontognathus; Mago-Leccia, 1994

Type species
- Megadontognathus cuyuniense Mago-Leccia, 1994

Genus of fishes

Megadontognathus is a genus of ghost knifefishes found in river rapids in tropical South America. They are brown with a stubby snout and reach about 20–25 cm (8–10 in) in total length.

== Species ==
There are currently two described species in this genus:

- Megadontognathus cuyuniense Mago-Leccia, 1994
- Megadontognathus kaitukaensis Campos-da-Paz, 1999
