= Melanosternarchus =

Scientific classification
- Domain: Eukaryota
- Kingdom: Animalia
- Phylum: Chordata
- Class: Actinopterygii
- Order: Gymnotiformes
- Family: Apteronotidae
- Subfamily: Apteronotinae
- Genus: Melanosternarchus; Bernt, Crampton, Orfinger & Albert, 2018
- Species: M. amaru

Binomial name
- Melanosternarchus amaru Bernt, Crampton, Orfinger & Albert, 2018

Genus of fishes

Melanosternarchus is a genus of ghost knifefish found in the Amazon basin of Brazil and Peru. The single species in this genus, Melanosternarchus amaru is primarily found in the deep channels of large blackwater rivers. This species can be recognized by its large mouth, slender body and an absence of scales on its nape and dorsum. Its maximum recorded size is 272 mm (10.7 inches).
