= Sternarchogiton =

Scientific classification
- Domain: Eukaryota
- Kingdom: Animalia
- Phylum: Chordata
- Class: Actinopterygii
- Order: Gymnotiformes
- Family: Apteronotidae
- Subfamily: Apteronotinae
- Genus: Sternarchogiton; C. H. Eigenmann, 1905

Type species
- Sternarchus nattereri Steindachner, 1868

Synonyms
- Oedemognathus Myers, 1936

Genus of fishes

Sternarchogiton is a genus of weakly electric knifefish in the family Apteronotidae, all living in the main channel of large rivers in the Amazon and Orinoco basins in South America.

They have a blunt snout and depending on the exact species reach up to 20–40 cm (8–16 in) in total length. The adult males of S. nattereri have teeth on the outside of the jaw, believed to be used in fights with other males, and it was formerly placed in its own genus because of this unique feature. Sternarchogiton are distinguished from other apteronotid genera by details of the skull and the broad descending blades of the pterygiophores in the anal fin. They are related to the genera Adontosternarchus and Porotergus.

== Species ==
Sternarchogiton contains the following valid species:

- Sternarchogiton labiatus de Santana & Crampton, 2007
- Sternarchogiton nattereri (Steindachner, 1868)
- Sternarchogiton porcinum C. H. Eigenmann & W. R. Allen, 1942
- Sternarchogiton zuanoni de Santana & Vari, 2010
