= Sternarchorhamphus =

Conservation status
- Least Concern (IUCN 3.1)

Scientific classification
- Kingdom: Animalia
- Phylum: Chordata
- Class: Actinopterygii
- Order: Gymnotiformes
- Family: Apteronotidae
- Subfamily: Sternarchorhamphinae
- Genus: Sternarchorhamphus; C. H. Eigenmann, 1905
- Species: S. muelleri

Binomial name
- Sternarchorhamphus muelleri (Steindachner, 1881)

Synonyms
- Sternarchus (Rhamphosternarchus) muelleri Steindachner, 1881

Genus of fishes

Sternarchorhamphus is a monospecific genus of weakly electric belonging to the family Apteronotidae, the ghost knifefishes. The only species in the genus is Sternarchorhamphus muelleri. This fish occurs in the Amazon and Orinoco river basins in tropical South America. It has a long pointed snout and reaches up to about 45 cm (18 in) in total length. It is one of two species in the subfamily Sternarchorhamphinae.
