= Parapteronotus =

Conservation status
- Least Concern (IUCN 3.1)

Scientific classification
- Kingdom: Animalia
- Phylum: Chordata
- Class: Actinopterygii
- Order: Gymnotiformes
- Family: Apteronotidae
- Subfamily: Apteronotinae
- Genus: Parapteronotus; Albert, 2001
- Species: P. hasemani

Binomial name
- Parapteronotus hasemani (M. M. Ellis, 1913)

Synonyms
- Sternarchus hasemani M. M. Ellis, 1913; Apteronotus anas C. H. Eigenmann & W. R. Allen, 1942

Genus of fishes

Parapteronotus hasemani, the duckbill knifefish, is a species of ghost knifefish found in main river channels and along the margins in the Amazon basin of Brazil and Peru. It is the only member of the genus Parapteronotus. This dark-colored knifefish reaches up to about 38 cm (15 in) in total length.

Named in honor of John D. Haseman (1887-1969), field collector in the Carnegie Museum of Natural History's Department of Ichthyology from 1908 to 1911, who collected the type specimen.
