= Platyurosternarchus =

Scientific classification
- Kingdom: Animalia
- Phylum: Chordata
- Class: Actinopterygii
- Order: Gymnotiformes
- Family: Apteronotidae
- Subfamily: Apteronotinae
- Genus: Platyurosternarchus; Mago-Leccia, 1994

Type species
- Sternarchus macrostomus Günther, 1870

Genus of fishes

Platyurosternarchus is a genus of ghost knifefishes found in the Amazon, Orinoco and Essequibo river basins in tropical South America. They are medium-sized knifefish that reach up to 41.5 cm (16.3 in) in total length and have a relatively long, downwards-pointed tubular snout. They are typically found in streams or near the shore of rivers, often among submerged tree trunks and branches over a leaf-covered bottom where they find their invertebrate prey.

== Species ==
There are two currently recognized species:

- Platyurosternarchus crypticus de Santana & Vari, 2009
- Platyurosternarchus macrostomus (Günther, 1870)
