= Sternarchogiton nattereri =

Conservation status
- Least Concern (IUCN 3.1)

Scientific classification
- Kingdom: Animalia
- Phylum: Chordata
- Class: Actinopterygii
- Order: Gymnotiformes
- Family: Apteronotidae
- Genus: Sternarchogiton
- Species: S. nattereri

Binomial name
- Sternarchogiton nattereri (Steindachner, 1868)

Synonyms
- Oedemognathus exodon Myers, 1936; Sternarchus nattereri Steindachner, 1868

Species of weakly electric knifefish

Sternarchogiton nattereri is a species of weakly electric knifefish in the family Apteronotidae. It is native to the Amazon River system and feeds on sponges. Unlike other members of the genus Sternarchogiton, there is pronounced sexual dimorphism in S. nattereri, with reproductively mature males developing strong external teeth on tips of their jaws. These males are so different from the females and juveniles that they were thought to be a different genus and species, the "tooth-lip knifefish" Oedemognathus exodon, for over 40 years.

== Distribution and habitat ==
S. nattereri is restricted to large river channels in the lowlands of the Amazon basin. Its habitat ranges from high-conductivity, sediment-rich whitewater rivers such as the Rio Solimões, to low-conductivity, sediment-poor blackwaters such as the Rio Negro. It is one of the most common gymnotiforms in Rio Solimões.

== Description ==
S. nattereri has a laterally compressed, knife-shaped body. The dorsal profile of the head is sharply curved from the nape to the snout. The mouth is terminal, with the upper jaw longer than the lower. The dentary is as long as deep, bearing a row of 7–8 conical teeth on the posterior portion, and there are upper and lower pharyngeal tooth plates bearing 9–11 and 7–9 teeth respectively. The eyes are small and covered by translucent skin. The long anal fin contains 180–198 rays. The pectoral fins are broad and pointed with 13–15 rays each, and the lanceolate caudal fin contains 11–15 rays and is almost completely covered with scales. There is a whip-like dorsal appendage anchored into a groove along the back by many fine threads of tendon.

In reproductively mature males, the head becomes elongated and prominent external teeth develop on the upper and lower jaws. Males with teeth tend to have larger gonads than those without. The coloration is a uniform pale white with a pinkish hue caused by subdermal capillaries, especially over anal fin pterygiophores (fin support bones). The operculum is pink due to the presence of the gills underneath. The dorsal surface is gray, with tuberous electroreceptors visible as white dots. All the fins are hyaline, without dark chromatophores. The maximum known length is 25 cm (10 in), with males tending to be larger than females.

== Etymology ==
The fish is named in honor of Johann Natterer.

== Biology and ecology ==
The diet of S. nattereri consists of freshwater sponges growing on submerged trees, stumps, and other woody debris. Before they were recognized to be the males of S. nattereri, "Oedemognathus exodon" was speculated to use its dentition to feed on fish scales. The external teeth of male S. nattereri are now thought to be used in combat for territory or mates; scars and scratches have been found on the napes of several specimens.

In the Tefé region of Brazil, breeding occurs during the rising water period, with adults spawning in floating meadows along the edges of paraná channels (side branches of whitewater rivers that run through adjacent várzea floodplains). As water levels rise further and dissolved oxygen levels drop, the growing juveniles eventually disperse out of these floodplains within floating rafts of vegetation.

Like other apteronotids, S. nattereri produces a continuous, weak electric field for the purposes of electrolocation and communication; this electric organ discharge (EOD) has a fundamental frequency between 732–1465 Hz, one of the largest ranges in the Apteronotidae. The waveform of this discharge has 2–4 phases and exhibits significant variation amongst individuals, but there is no obvious sexual dimorphism. S. nattereri is additionally able to modulate the frequency and amplitude of its EOD to produce communication signals called "chirps" (short-duration, high-frequency signals) and "gradual frequency rises" (long-duration, low-frequency signals). The frequency elevation of S. nattereri chirps ranges between 50 and 300 Hz above baseline, with a maximum of 500 Hz.
