= Pharyngeal teeth =

Teeth in the throat of a number of fish species

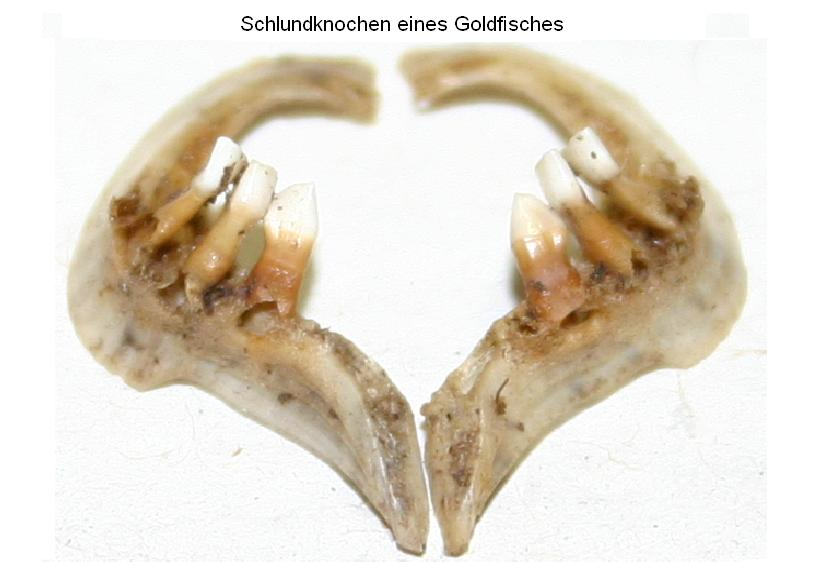
Pharyngeal teeth of a goldfish

Pharyngeal teeth are teeth in the pharyngeal arch of the throat of cyprinids, suckers, and a number of other fish species otherwise lacking openly visible teeth.

Many popular aquarium fish such as goldfish and loaches have these structures. Members of the genus Botia such as clown loaches are known to make distinctive clicking sounds when they grind their pharyngeal teeth. Grunts (family Haemulidae) are so called because of the sound they make when they grind them. Molas are said to be able to produce sound by grinding their long, claw-like pharyngeal teeth.

The Chinese high fin banded shark (Myxocyprinus asiaticus) (family Catostomidae) has a single row of pharyngeal teeth with comb-like arrangements. The Cape Fear shiner (family Cyprinidae) only has pharyngeal teeth, similar to the teeth of other omnivorous shiners. The redear sunfish (family Centrarchidae) has thick pharyngeal teeth composed of hard, movable plates, which it uses to crush the exoskeletons of prey. The pharyngeal jaws of the moray eel (family Muraenidae) possess their own set of teeth. The dentary of the ghost knifefish species Sternarchogiton nattereri (family Apteronotidae) has upper and lower pharyngeal tooth plates bearing 9–11 and 7–9 teeth, respectively.

The mouth cone ("everted pharynx") of a possible new species of Meiopriapulus, a marine worm in the Priapulida, bears pharyngeal teeth.

Fossils of the Yunnanozoon and Haikouella possess pharyngeal teeth.

The lower pharyngeal bones of cichlids also carry specialized teeth which augment their normal mandibular teeth in the breakdown of food.

== See also ==
- Animal tooth development
- Fish jaw: The primary oral jaws open and close the mouth, and a second set of pharyngeal jaws are positioned at the back of the throat.
- Ichthyology terms
- Hallucigenia
