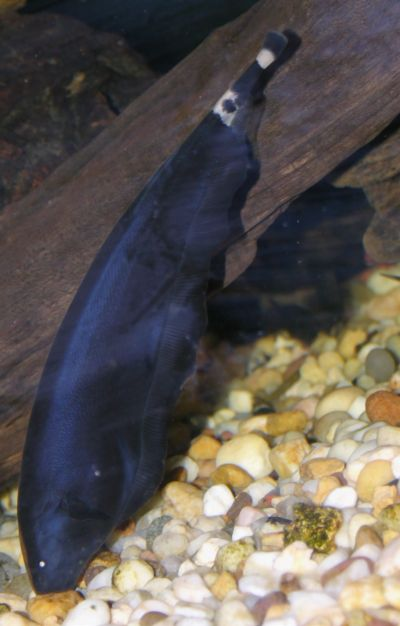
- Black ghost knifefish (Apteronotus albifrons)

Scientific classification
- Kingdom: Animalia
- Phylum: Chordata
- Class: Actinopterygii
- Clade: Siluriphysi
- Order: Gymnotiformes
- Family: Apteronotidae; D. S. Jordan, 1923

= Ghost knifefish =

Ghost knifefishes

Family of fishes

The ghost knifefishes consist of the family Apteronotidae, which are ray-finned fishes in the order Gymnotiformes. These fish are native to Panama and South America. They inhabit a wide range of freshwater habitats, but more than half the species in the family are found deep in rivers (typically deeper than 5 m or 16 ft) where there is little or no light. The genus Apteronotus is "artificial" and some of the species do not actually belong in it; it is polyphyletic.

They are distinguished from other gymnotiform fishes by the presence of a caudal fin (all other families lack a caudal or tail fin) as well as a fleshy dorsal organ represented by a longitudinal strip along the dorsal midline. They vary greatly in size, ranging from about 15 cm (6 in) in total length in the smallest species to 60 cm (2 ft) in the largest. It has been claimed that Apteronotus magdalenensis is up to 130 cm (4.3 ft), but this is not supported by recent studies, which indicate that it does not surpass about 50 cm (1.6 ft). These nocturnal fish have small eyes, and some species may exhibit sexual dimorphism in their snout shape and jaws.

Like all gymnotiformes, Apteronotids are electric fish, using a high frequency tone-type (also called wave-type) electric organ discharge (EOD) to communicate.

Many Apteronotids are aggressive predators of small aquatic insect larvae and fishes, though there is great variation in their diets. Species of the genus Sternarchella are very unusual, preying on the tails of other electric fishes. Other species, such as Sternarchorhynchus and Sternarchorhamphus, have tubular snouts and forage for aquatic insect larvae and other small animals which burrow into the river bed (the benthos). At least one species (Sternarchogiton nattereri) eats freshwater sponges which grow on submerged trees, stumps, and other woody debris. Some species are even planktivorous.

The black ghost knifefish (Apteronotus albifrons) and brown ghost knifefish (Apteronotus leptorhynchus) are readily available as aquarium fish. Others are known to appear in the trade but are quite rare.

== Genera ==
FishBase lists 89 species in 16 genera, However, after a number of recent taxonomic advances, Eschmeyer's Catalog of Fishes recognizes 94 species in 16 genera and 2 subfamilies.

- Subfamily Apteronotinae Jordan, 1923
  - Genus Adontosternarchus Ellis, 1912
  - Genus Apteronotus Lacépède, 1800
  - Genus Compsaraia Albert, 2001
  - Genus Megadontognathus Mago-Leccia, 1994
  - Genus Melanosternarchus Bernt, Crampton, Orfinger & Albert, 2018
  - Genus Parapteronotus Albert, 2001
  - Genus Pariosternarchus Albert & Crampton, 2006
  - Genus Platyurosternarchus Mago-Leccia, 1994
  - Genus Porotergus Ellis, 1912
  - Genus Sternarchella C. H. Eigenmann, 1905
  - Genus Sternarchogiton Eigenmann, 1905
  - Genus Sternarchorhynchus Castelnau, 1855
  - Genus Tembeassu Triques, 1998
  - Genus Tenebrosternarchus Bernt, Fronk, Evans & Albert, 2020
- Subfamily Sternarchorhamphinae Albert, 2001
  - Genus Orthosternarchus Ellis, 1912
  - Genus Sternarchorhamphus Eigenmann, 1905
Members of Apteronotidae

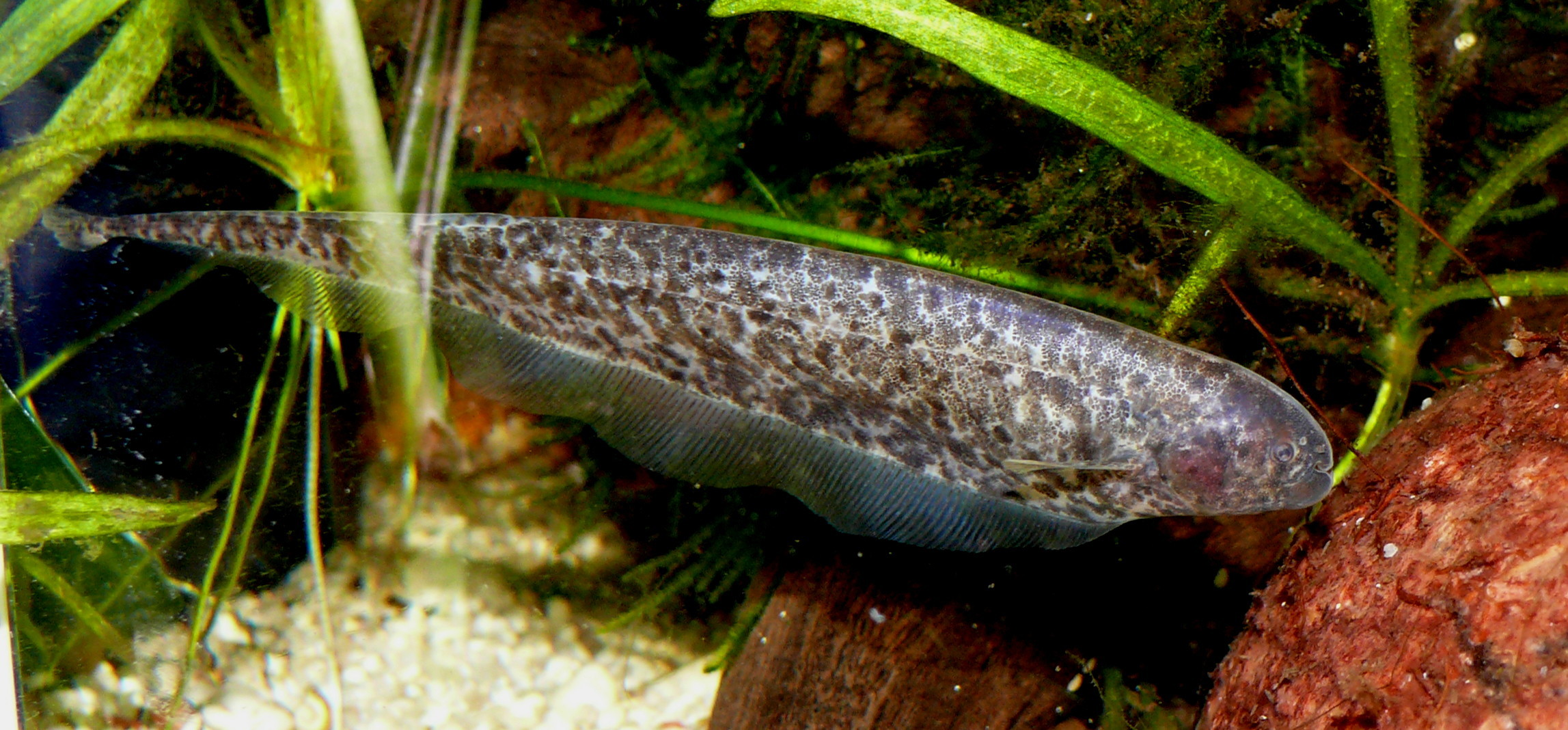
Adontosternarchus balaenops

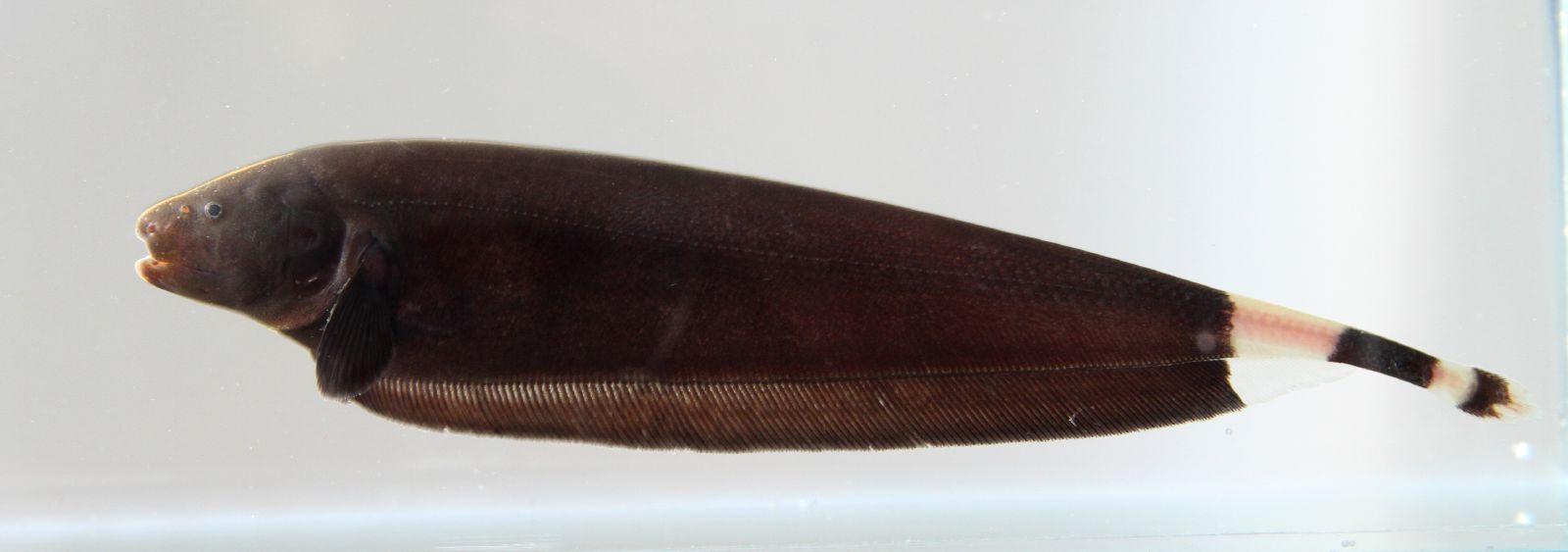
Apteronotus albifrons

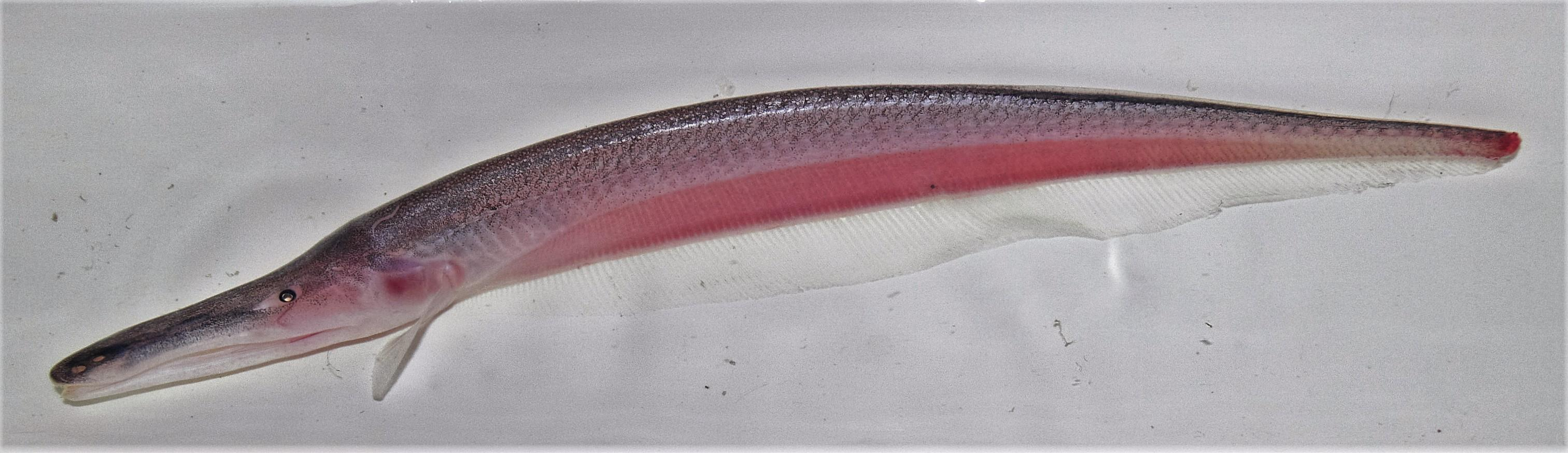
Compsaraia samueli

Melanosternarchus amaru

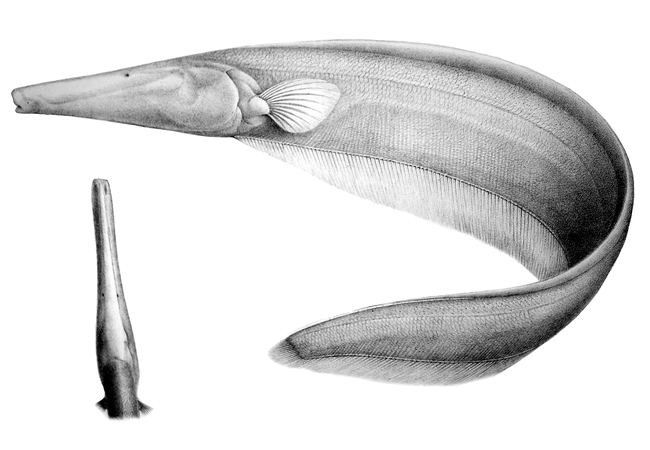
Orthosternarchus tamandua

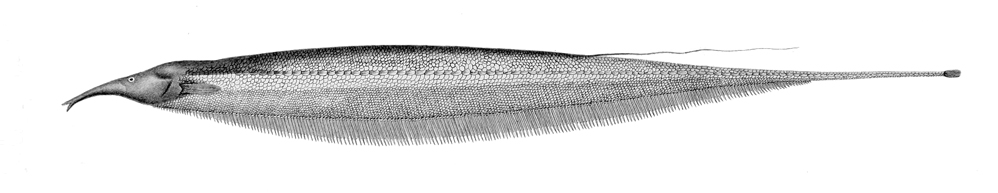
Sternarchorhynchus oxyrhynchus

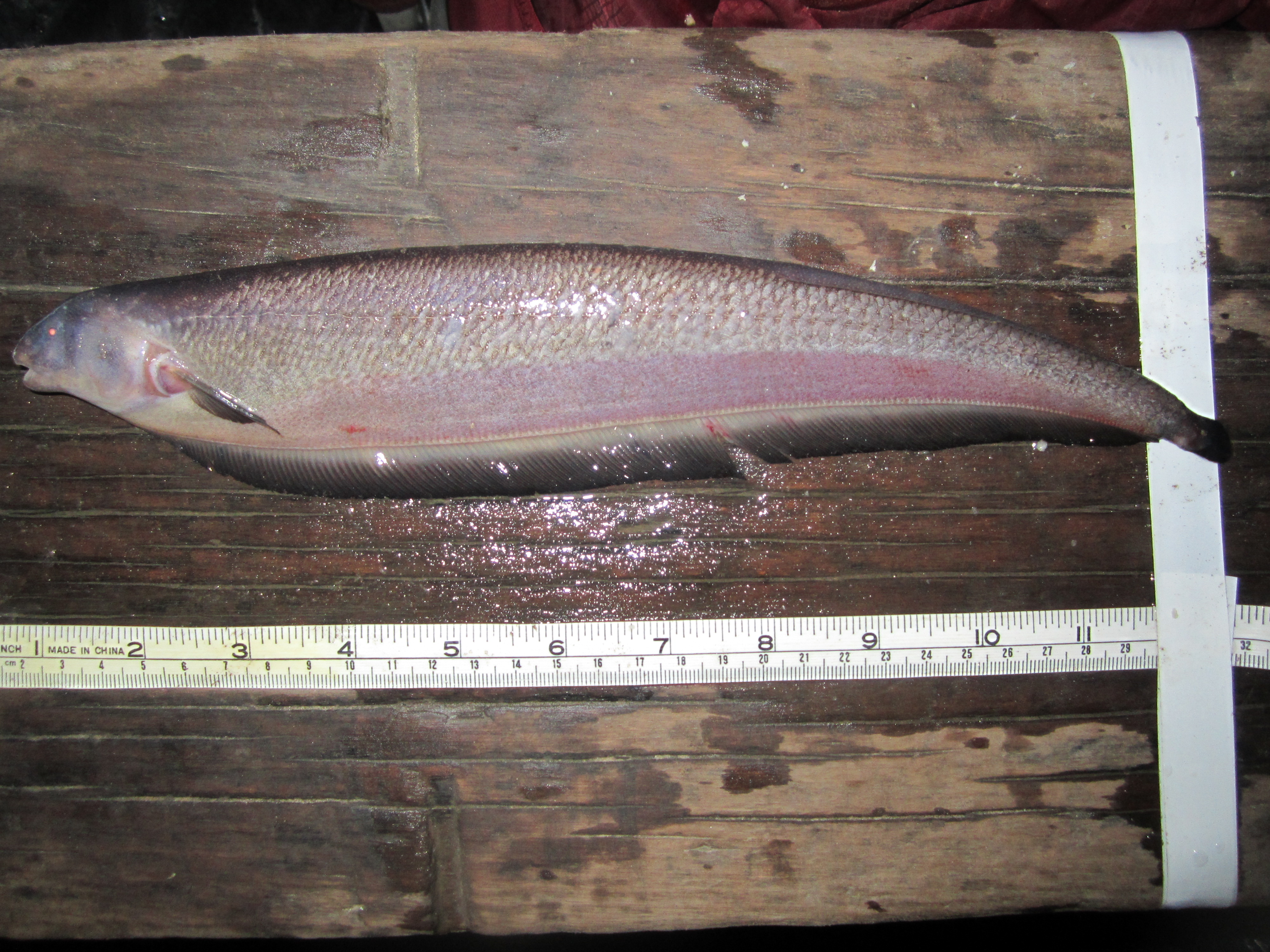
Tenebrosternarchus preto

The following cladogram is based on a 2019 phylogenetic study analyzing both mitochondrial and nuclear gene sequences of Apteronotidae:

- - Sternarchorhamphinae
    - Orthosternarchus tamandua
    - Sternarchorhamphus muelleri
  - Apteronotinae
    - Adontosternarchus
    - - Apteronotus cuchillejo
      - - - - Navajini
              ⊞
              ⊟
              - - - Apteronotus bonapartii
                  - Sternarchella
                - - - - Melanosternarchus
                      - Compsaraia
                    - Pariosternarchus
                  - Sternarchogiton
              - Tenebrosternarchus
            - Sternarchorhynchus
          - Platyurosternarchus
        - Apteronotini
          ⊞
          ⊟
          - - - Parapteronotus hasemani
              - Apteronotus albifrons
            - Apteronotus mariae
          - - - Megadontognathus kaitukaensis
              - Apteronotus acidops
            - - - Apteronotus eschmeyeri
                - Apteronotus magdalenensis
              - - Apteronotus baniwa
                - Apteronotus galvisi
- - - Distocyclus conirostris
    - Eigenmannia macrops
  - Rhabdolichops cf. stewarti
