= Max Mapes Ellis =

- Born: December 3, 1887; Lawrence, Indiana
- Died: August 26, 1953 (aged 65); Los Angeles, California
- Education: Vincennes University; Indiana University (PhD)
- Known for: Mussel propagation research Gimbel expedition Water pollution research
- Spouse: Marion Durbin Ellis
- Children: Cornelia Ellis
- Scientific career
- Fields: Physiology; Ichthyology
- Workplaces: University of Colorado; University of Michigan; University of Missouri; U.S. Bureau of Fisheries
- Patrons: Indiana University; Carnegie Museum of Natural History; U.S. Bureau of Fisheries

Max Mapes Ellis (December 3, 1887 – August 26, 1953) was an American physiologist. He married American ichthyologist Marion Durbin Ellis (1887–1972) in 1909.

== Early life and career ==
Ellis, born in Lawrence, Indiana, and raised in West Lafayette, Indiana, was the son of Horace and Grace V. Ellis. He completed his undergraduate studies at Vincennes University in 1907, where he was an active member of the Sigma Pi fraternity. In 1908, he attended Sigma Pi's inaugural National Congress as a delegate. Subsequently, Ellis earned his PhD from Indiana University in 1909. Following his graduation, he assumed the role of assistant professor of biology, overseeing the zoological department at the University of Colorado at Boulder, situated in Boulder, Colorado.

In 1909 he was published in The Journal of Experimental Zoology for his experimentation with tadpoles.

As a young man, Ellis also served in the National Guard for four years for Indiana and then Idaho rising to the rank of sergeant.

== Gimbel expedition ==
In 1911 he headed the Gimbel exploration into the regions of the headwaters of the Amazon River. Under the joint auspices of Indiana University and the Carnegie Museum of Natural History this expedition made valuable biological discoveries about the gymnotidae eels and fish of the region. These discoveries were chronicled in his paper Gymnotid Eels of Tropical America which was published in 1913.

== Mid career ==
In 1913, he and Frank Marion Andrews were published in the Bulletin of the Torrey Botanical Club with an article about the leaf hairs of salvinia natans. His first book, The Amphibia and Reptilia of Colorado, which he co-wrote with Junius Henderson was published in 1913. His second book, Fishes of Colorado, was published in 1914.

During this time, he and his wife Marion had their first child, Cornelia Grace, who was born in October 1914.

By 1914 he was on staff at the University of Michigan Biological Station.

He published many articles about plant and animal life in the American West. He had two articles published in the journal Nautilus. The first in 1916 and the second, with M. Keim, in 1918. He was published twice in the Proceedings of the United States National Museum, first in 1912 and again in 1919. He was also published in Transactions of The American Microscopical Society (1913) and Copeia (1917).

In 1917 Ellis became a charter member of the Ecological Society of America.

In 1921 Ellis was a member of the faculty of the University of Missouri.

== U.S. Bureau of Fisheries ==
Beginning in 1925 and through the 1940s Ellis worked in association with the Fairport, Iowa lab of the U.S. Bureau of Fisheries on the Mississippi River. His work centered on an effort to propagate mussels, which were then used by the button industry, in the river. Finding a way to increase the number of mussels became a near obsession for him.

He had a few early successes. In 1925 he found that ultraviolet rays were fatal to glochidia, which was why mussels fared better in the dark. He also found that the acid-alkali balance of the blood the glochida fed on was important. This led to his use of a nutritive solution in 1926 which became known as the Ellis Method. This method was thought to be a way around the parasitic stage of mussel life and was published in Science magazine that year. However, this process did not transfer well from the laboratory to the field.

In the fall of 1927 he took a sabbatical and visited European labs in an attempt to gain further insight. He visited the University of Glasgow where he worked under Dr. D. Noel Paton and with protein chemist Dr. E.P. Cathcart. He also visited the Marine Laboratory on the island of Great Cumbrae, Firth of Clyde where he was able to use the Coates Research Room and Table. With the help of Paton's introductions he also visited several medical labs in England and travelled to the Netherlands, Germany, Czechoslovakia, Austria, Switzerland, and Belgium. On his return to the U.S. in 1928 he designed several apparatus to culture mussels.

Ellis', and other scientists', work on the problem lead them to see the problems in broader terms than just the mussel population. Beginning in 1930, they began to study the river as a whole and Ellis was able to prove mussels were sensitive to water quality. His eleven-person team, working out of the University of Missouri School of Medicine in Columbia, would later develop techniques for water chemistry analysis for river water. They also found that it was better to transport mussels in damp material rather than in ice.

In 1932 Ellis was chosen to supervise the Investigations in Interior Waters which combined the mussel propagation study with pollution studies. The study looked at 800 miles of the Mississippi river, streams in 21 states, and mining pollution in Idaho, North Dakota, and Montana. In 1937 he published an article on assay techniques. The pollution study continued until 1940 but Ellis continued to write about the subject with (what in 1940 became) the U.S. Fish and Wildlife Service until 1947.

In 1932 the U.S. Bureau of Fisheries Fort Worth, TX station began experiments on mussels. He moved his study of mussels there because of the suitable water and relatively warm winters. He continued to refine his method and to study the effect of pollution on mussels needed for the button industry. A portion of his work had been funded by the industry. The program stayed there until the US Fish and Wildlife Service cut funding for it in 1942 Reasons for the cut include the beginning of World War II, Ellis's refusal to make a demonstration, and the belief that the button industry was fading away. He was also secretive and did not apply for a copyright for his method because he would have to write it down.

Ellis died in Los Angeles, California in 1953. He is described as a careful scientist with a respectable career and reputation. It is doubtful that he would tarnish it with false claims. Lab work since that time has confirmed that some species can skip their parasitic stage. In 1982 Billy G. Isom and Robert G. Hudson published information on a solution they used to attain the same results as Ellis' group in the 1930s.

== Lost work ==
In the late 1990s, historian Philip Scarpino had arranged with the University of Missouri to inspect Ellis's equipment and papers which had been stored in the attic of a science building. Unfortunately, when he arrived he found that everything had been discarded. Anyone finding more of his records, pertinent to the history of mussels and the U.S. Bureau of Fisheries, should contact the D.C. Booth Historic National Fish Hatchery in Spearfish, South Dakota so that the records may be preserved.

== See also ==
- Category:Taxa named by Max Mapes Ellis

== Patronymi ==
The Knifefish Parapteronotus ellisi is named after Ellis. The Armoured catfish Corydoras ellisae and tetrane Hyphessobrycon ellisae is not named after him, but after his wife, Marion Durbin Ellis.

== Other publications ==
Dr. Ellis also published these works:

- M.M. Ellis and M.D. Ellis, "Growth and Transformation of Parasitic Glochidia in Physiological Nutrient Solutions," Science 64 (No. 1667, December 10, 1926): 579–80.
- M.M. Ellis, Amanda D. Merrick, and Marion D. Ellis, "The Blood of North American Fresh-Water Mussels Under Normal and Adverse Conditions," Bulletin of the Bureau of Fisheries 46 (1930): 509–542, esp. 540.
- M.M. Ellis, "Memorandum of Propagation and Natural Replacement of Fresh Water Mussels." c. 1930
- M.M. Ellis, "Detection . . . . of Stream Pollution," 1937, Fish 280
- M.M. Ellis, "Report on Status of F.P. 41, Stream-Pollution Studies," Fisheries Service Bulletin No. 235, 1 December 1934, DCB.
- M.M. Ellis, "Summer Pollution Surveys," Fisheries Service Bulletin No. 304, 1 September 1940, DCB.
- M.M. Ellis, "Investigations of mussels and pollution in interior waters," Report of the United States Commissioner of Fisheries, 1931, 621–25.
- Ellis, M.M. "Some factors affecting the replacement of commercial fresh-water mussels." United States Bureau of Fisheries Economic Circular 57. Washington, D.C.: U.S. Bureau of Fisheries, 1931.
- Ellis, M.M. "A Survey of conditions affecting Fisheries on the Upper Mississippi River." Fishery Circular No. 5, United States Bureau of Fisheries, 1931.
- Ellis, M.M. "Water Purity Standards for Fresh Water Fishes." Fish and Wildlife Service Special Scientific Report No. 2, 1935.
- Ellis, M.M. "Erosion Silt as a Factor in Aquatic Environments." Ecology 17 (No. 1, 1936): 29–42.
- Ellis, M.M. "Detection and Measurement of Stream Pollution. Bulletin of the U.S. Bureau of Fisheries 48 (1937): 365-437. Also listed as Bulletin No. 22.
- Ellis, M.M. "Pollution of the Coeur D'Alene River and Adjacent Waters by Mine Wastes." USDI Bureau of Fisheries, Special Scientific Report No. 1, 1940.
- Ellis, M.M. "Stream Pollution Studies in the State of Mississippi." Fish and Wildlife Service Scientific Report No. 3, 1943.
- Ellis, M.M., and M.D. Ellis. "Growth and Transformation of Parasitic Glochidia in Physiological Nutrient Solutions." Science 64 No. 1667 (1926): 579–80.
- Ellis, M. M., Amanda D. Merrick, and Marion D. Ellis. "The Blood of North American Fresh-Water Mussels Under Normal and Adverse Conditions." Bulletin of the Bureau of Fisheries 46 (1930): 509–542. [also * identified as Bureau of Fisheries Doc. No. 1097].
- Ellis, M.M., B.A. Westfall, and M.D. Ellis. "Determination of Water Quality." Fish and Wildlife Service Research Report No. 9, pp. 1–122, 1946.
- Ellis, M.M., B.A. Westfall, D.K. Meyer and W.S. Platner. "Water Quality Studies of the Delaware River with Reference to Shad Migration." Fish and Wildlife Service Special Scientific Report No. 38, 1947.
