= Francisco Mago Leccia =

Venezuelan ichthyologist (1931–2004)

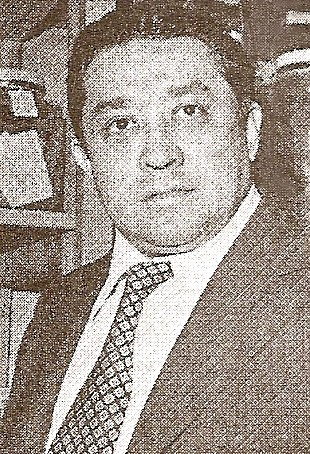
Francisco Mago Leccia

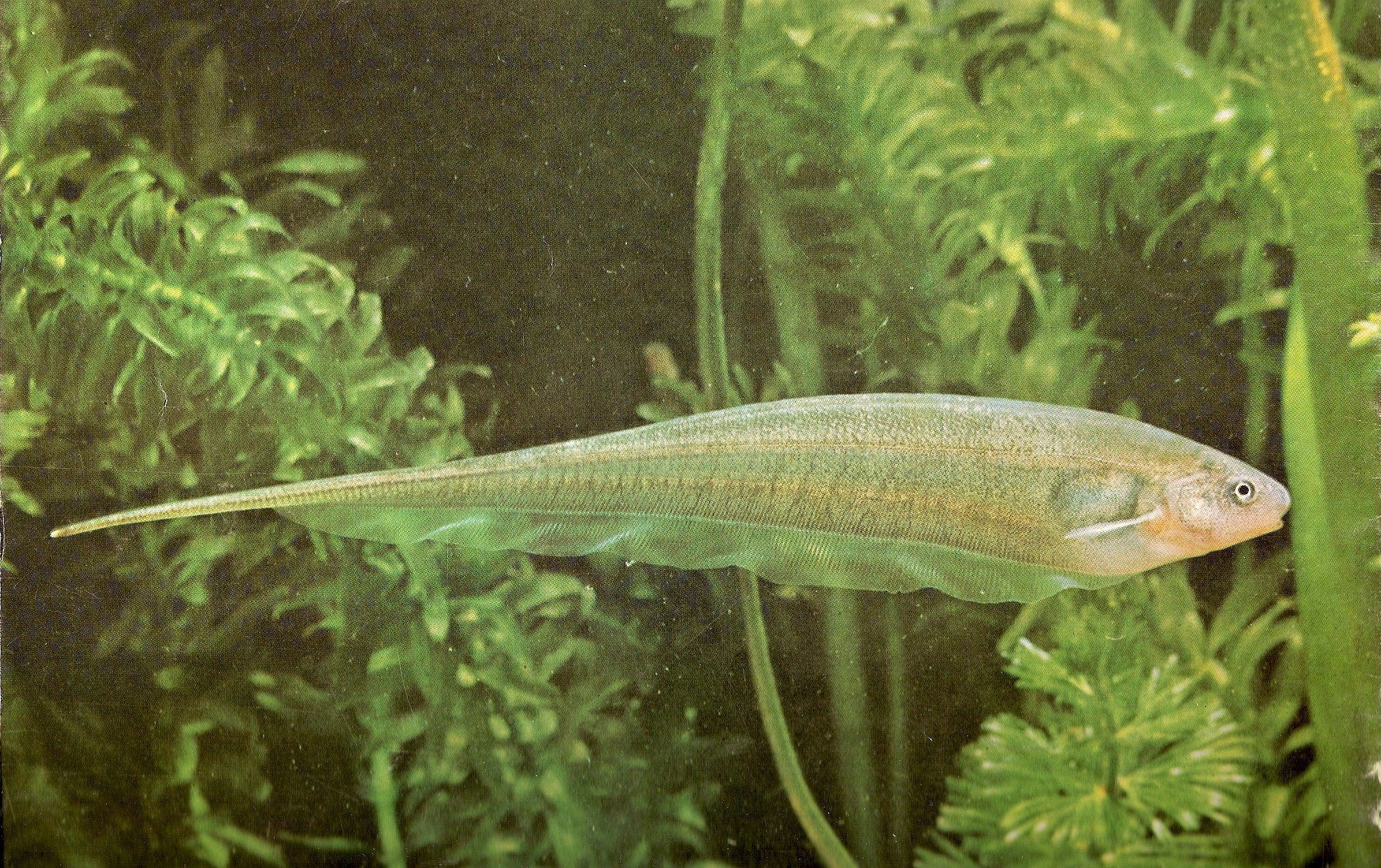
Eigemania viricens (Gymnotiformes: Sternopygidae)

Francisco Mago Leccia (“Mago”; May 21, 1931, in Tumeremo, Bolívar State, Venezuela – February 27, 2004, in Puerto La Cruz, Anzoátegui State, Venezuela), was a distinguished Venezuelan ichthyologist who specialized in electric fish of the rivers and lagoons of South America, particularly of Venezuela. His education was Docent in Biology and Chemistry graduate from the “Instituto Pedagógico de Caracas”, (today Universidad Pedagógica Experimental El Libertador), Master of Sciences (Marine Biology) from the University of Miami, Florida, U.S.A., Doctor in Sciences from Universidad Central de Venezuela. His Doctoral Thesis was entitled: “Los peces Gymnotiformes de Venezuela: un estudio preliminar para la revisión del grupo en la América del Sur” (The Gymnotiformes fish of Venezuela: a preliminary study for the revision of the group in South America).

Francisco Mago was a founding member of the Instituto Oceanográfico de la Universidad de Oriente in Cumaná Sucre state Venezuela and a founding member of the Instituto de Zoologia Tropical (IZT) de la Universidad Central de Venezuela situated in Caracas Venezuela. He was a teacher of the chair of Animal Biology, Vertebrate Biology and Systematic Ichthyology at the Biology School of Sciences Faculty of the Universidad Central de Venezuela. He was director of the Museo de Biología de la Universidad Central de Venezuela (MBUCV) and Acuario Agustín Codazzi. He was editor of the Acta Biologica Venezuelica (ABV). In 1968 he founded the Mago Collection of MBUCV considered the largest ichthyological collection in Latin America. It is a mandatory study resource on tropical fish for experts who wish to know more about this area. Currently the Mago Collection has a heritage of 33,000 fishes thousand preserved in alcohol and skeletons.

== Publications ==
=== Books ===
- MAGO LECCIA, FRANCISCO. 1970: “Lista de los peces de Venezuela incluyendo un estudio preliminar de la ictiogeografía del país”. Ministerio de Agricultura y Cría. Caracas – Venezuela 285p.
- MAGO LECCIA, FRANCISCO. 1976: “Los peces Gymnotiformes de Venezuela: un estudio preliminar para la revisión del grupo en la América del Sur”. Universidad Central de Venezuela. Tesis Doctoral. Caracas – Venezuela 376p.
- MAGO LECCIA, FRANCISCO. 1978: “Los peces de agua dulce de Venezuela”. Cuadernos Lagoven. Lagoven, S. A. Caracas – Venezuela. 36p.
- MAGO LECCIA, FRANCISCO. 1978: “Los peces de la Familia Sternopygidae de Venezuela”. Acta Científica Venezolana. 29(supl.1):1–91.
- MAGO LECCIA, FRANCISCO. 1994: “Electric Fishes of the continental waters of América”. Biblioteca de la Academia de Ciencias Físicas, Matemáticas y Naturales. XXIX:1–229p.

=== Review, magazines and journals ===
- MAGO LECCIA, FRANCISCO. 1958: “The comparative osteology of the scombroid fishes of the genus Scomberomorus from Florida”. Bulletin of the Marine Sciences of the Gulf and Caribbean. 8(4):299–341.
- MAGO LECCIA, FRANCISCO. 1962: “Osteología comparada en ocho especies de Pamadassyidae (Pisces-Perciformes) del golfo de Cariaco, Venezuela y áreas adyacentes”. Boletín del Instituto Oceanográfico. Universidad de Oriente. 1(2):396–473.
- MAGO LECCIA, FRANCISCO. 1965: “Contribución a la sistemática y ecologia de los peces la laguna de Unare, Venezuela. Bulletin of the Marine Sciences. 15(2):274–330.
- MAGO LECCIA, FRANCISCO. 1965: “Nuevas adiciones a la ictiofauna de Venezuela. I”. Acta Biologica Venezuelica. 4(13):365–420.
- MAGO LECCIA, FRANCISCO. 1966: “Los peces de los llanos de Venezuela” Universidad Central de Venezuela. Instituto de Zoología Tropical. Caracas – Venezuela. 33p.
- MAGO LECCIA, FRANCISCO. 1967: “Notas preliminares sobre los peces de los llanos de Venezuela”. Boletín de la Sociedad Venezolana de Ciencias Naturales. 27(112):237–263.
- MAGO LECCIA, FRANCISCO. 1968: “Notas sobre los peces de río Guaire”. En: Estudios de Caracas Ecologia Vegetal y Fauna. Universidad Central de Venezuela. Caracas - Venezuela. 2 volúmenes. Pp:227–256.
- MAGO LECCIA, FRANCISCO. 1970: “Estudio preliminar sobre la ecología de los peces de los llanos de Venezuela”. Acta Biologica Venezuelica. 7(1):715–102.
- MAGO LECCIA, FRANCISCO. 1971: “La ictiofauna del Río Casiquiare”. 'Revista Defensa de la Naturaleza'. 1(4):5–6; 8-11.
- MAGO LECCIA, FRANCISCO. 1972: “Consideraciones sobre la sistemática de la familia Prochilodontidae (Osteichthyes, Cypriniformes), con una sinopsis de las especies de Venezuela”. Acta Biologica Venezuelica. 8(1):35–96.
- MAGO LECCIA, FRANCISCO. 1977: “Sistemática, biogeografía y piscicultura de los peces de agua dulce de Venezuela”. Primer Simposium Latinoamericano de Acuicultura, Maracay – Venezuela. 15p.
- MAGO LECCIA, FRANCISCO. 1983: “Entomocorus gameroi una nueva especie de bagre auqueniptérido (Teleostei, Siluriformes) de Venezuela, incluyendo la descripción de su dimorfismo sexual secundario”. Acta Biologica Venezuelica. 11(4):215–236.
- MAGO LECCIA, FRANCISCO. 1995: “El cultivo del camarón de río Macrobrachium carcinus, un potencial desestimado en Venezuela”. FONAIAP Divulga. 50:
- MAGO LECCIA FRANCISCO., Lumdberg, John G. & Bassin, J. N. 1985: Systematic of the South American freshwater fish genus Adontostenarchus (Gymnotiformes, Apteronotidae). Scientific Contributions of the Natural History Museum, Los Angeles County. 358:1–19.
- MAGO LECCIA FRANCISCO., Nass, Pedro. y Castillo. Otto. 1986. “Larvas, juveniles y adultos de bagres de la Familia Pimelodidae (Teleostei, Siluriformes) de Venezuela”. Proyecto S1-1500-CONICIT, Informe Final, 168 pp.
- MAGO LECCIA FRANCISCO. & Zares, T. M. 1978: “The taxonomic status of Rhabdolichops troscheli (Kaup, 1856), and speculations on gymnotiform evolution”. Env. Biol. Fish. 3(4):379–384:
- López Rojas, Hector., Machado Allison, Antonio. y MAGO LECCIA FRANCISCO. 1988: “Ecological studies in tropical fish communities”, Copeia. 2:503–505.
- Lumdberg, John G., Lewis, W. M., Saunders, J. F. y MAGO LECCIA FRANCISCO. 1987: “A major food web component in the Orinoco river channel: evidence from planktivorous electric fishes. Science. 237:81–83.
- Lumdberg, John G. & MAGO LECCIA FRANCISCO. 1986: “A review of Rhabdolichops (Gymnotiformes, Sternopygidae), a genus of South American freshwater fishes, with descriptions of four new species”. Proceedings of the Academic of Natural Sciences of Philadelphia. 138(1):53–85.
- Lundberg J. G., MAGO LECCIA FRANCISCO. y Nass, Pedro. 1991: Exallodontus aguanai, a new genus and species of pimelodidae (pisces: siluriformes) from deep river channels of South America, and delimitation of the subfamily pimelodinae. Proceedings of the Biological. Society of Washington. 104 (4): 840–869.
- Machado Allison, Antonio, Chernoff, Barry., Royero, Ramiro., León, MAGO LECCIA, FRANCISCO., Velásquez, Justiniano., Lasso, Carlos., López Rojas, Héctor., Bonilla Rivero, Ana, Provenzano, Francisco., y Silvera, Cristina. 2000: “Ictiofauna de la cuenca del Río Cuyuní en Venezuela”. Interciencia. 25(1):13–21.
- Taphorn, Donald., Royero, Ramiro., Machado Allison, Antonio. y MAGO LECCIA FRANCISCO. 1997: “Lista actualizada de los peces de agua dulce de Venezuela”. En: La Marca, E. (Editor): Vertebrados actuales y fósiles de Venezuela. Serie Catalogo Zoológico de Venezuela. Vol. 1. Museo de Ciencia y Tecnología de Mérida. Mérida – Venezuela. Pp:55–100.

=== Docents Manuals ===
- BELLO, ROSAURA, BODINI, ROBERTA., CHACÍN, HAYDEÉ DE., GUGIG, MIREYA DE., MAGO LECCIA FRANCISCO., RADA, DELIA. “Phylum Chordata: Subphylum Vertebrata”. En: En: Bodini, R y Rada D. “Biología Animal”. Editorial Ateneo de Caracas. Pp:87–95. Caracas – Venezuela.
- MAGO LECCIA FRANCISCO. 1980: “Phylum Porifera”. En: En: Bodini, R y Rada D. “Biología Animal”. Editorial Ateneo de Caracas. Pp:87–95. Caracas – Venezuela.
- MAGO LECCIA FRANCISCO. 1980: “Subphylum Cephalocordata”. En: En: Bodini, R y Rada D. “Biología Animal”. Editorial Ateneo de Caracas. Pp:256–261. Caracas – Venezuela.
- RACENIS, JANIS. Y MAGO LECCIA FRANCISCO. 1980: “Taxonomía”. En: En: Bodini, R y Rada D. “Biología Animal”. Editorial Ateneo de Caracas. Pp: 35-50. Caracas – Venezuela.
- MAGO LECCIA FRANCISCO. 1983: “Ictiología sistemática laboratorio”. Universidad Central de Venezuela. Caracas – Venezuela.

=== Species described by Francisco Mago Leccia ===
- Family Apteronotidae
- Adontosternarchus clarkae Mago-Leccia, Lundberg & Baskin, 1985
- Adontosternarchus devenanzii Mago-Leccia, Lundberg & Baskin, 1985
- Compsaraia compsus (Mago Leccia, 1994)
- Megadontognathus cuyuniense Mago-Leccia, 1994
- Porotergus compsus Mago-Leccia, 1994
- Sternarchella orinoco Mago-Leccia, 1994
- Sternarchella orthos Mago-Leccia, 1994
- Sternarchorhynchus roseni Mago-Leccia, 1994
- Family Auchenipteridae
- Entomocorus gameroi Mago-Leccia, 1983
- Family Gymnotidae
- Gymnotus cataniapo Mago-Leccia, 1994
- Gymnotus pedanopterus Mago-Leccia, 1994
- Gymnotus stenoleucus Mago-Leccia, 1994
- Family Hypopomidae
- Hypopygus neblinae Mago-Leccia, 1994.
- Racenisia fimbriipinna Mago-Leccia, 1994
- Family Pimelodidae
- Exallodontus aguanai Lundberg, Mago-Leccia & Nass, 1991
- Gladioglanis conquistador Lundberg, Bornbusch & Mago-Leccia, 1991
- Gladioglanis machadoi Ferraris & Mago-Leccia, 1989
- Family Sternopygidae
- Eigenmannia nigra Mago-Leccia, 1994
- Rhabdolichops eastwardi Lundberg & Mago-Leccia, 1986
- Rhabdolichops electrogrammus Lundberg & Mago-Leccia, 1986
- Rhabdolichops stewarti Lundberg & Mago-Leccia, 1986
- Rhabdolichops zareti Lundberg & Mago-Leccia, 1986
- Sternopygus astrabes Mago-Leccia, 1994

== Honors and namesakes ==
=== Species named in honor to Francisco Mago Leccia ===
- Ageneiosus magoi Castillo & Brull, 1989
- Apteronotus magoi Santana, Castillo & Taphorn, 2006
- Creagrutus magoi Vari & Harold 2001
- Brachyglanis magoi Fernández-Yépez, 1967
- Serrabrycon magoi Vari, 1986
- Stellifer magoi Aguilera, 1983
- Magosternarchus Lundberg, Coz Fernandes & Albert 1996
