= James S. Albert =

American biologist, professor

James S. Albert is a professor of Biology at the University of Louisiana at Lafayette. Albert is an author of over 100 scientific papers on the evolution and diversity of fishes, and is an expert in the systematics and biodiversity of Neotropical electric fishes (Gymnotiformes). Albert and his colleagues to date have described 50 new species.

== Education ==
Albert received a Bachelor of Science degree in Zoology from the University of California, Berkeley in 1987, and went on to earn a Master of Science and Ph.D. in Zoology from the University of Michigan.

== Publications ==
Albert is co-editor with Roberto E. Reis of the book Historical Biogeography of Neotropical Freshwater Fishes, which explores the evolutionary forces underlying the formation of the Amazon and Neotropical fish faunas. Albert is also co-editor with Peter van der Sleen of the book Field Guide to the Fishes of the Amazon, Orinoco, and Guianas, which provides descriptions and identification keys for all the known genera of fishes that inhabit the Amazon basin and other regions of tropical South America.

== See also ==
- Category:Taxa named by James S. Albert
