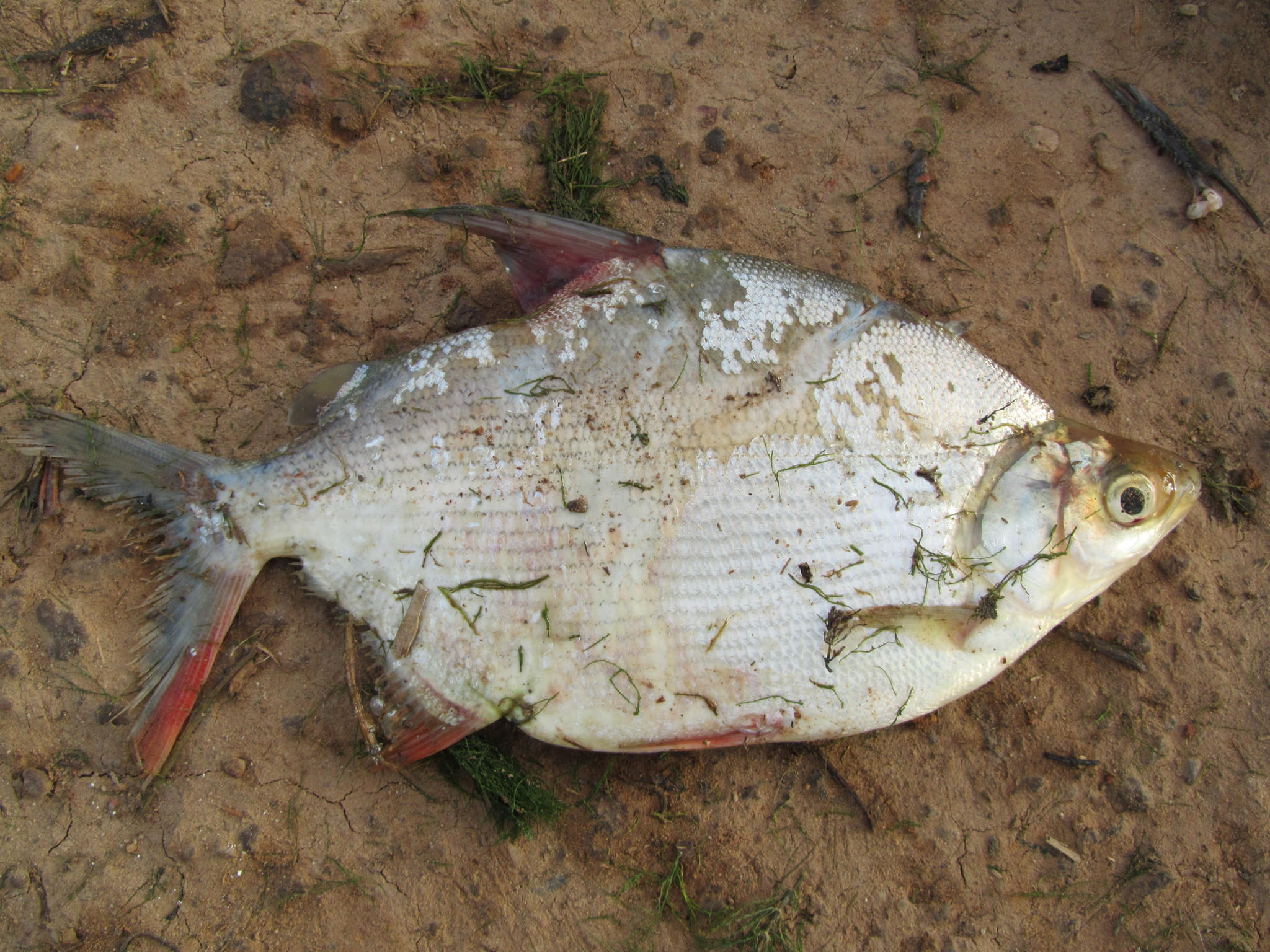
- Citharinus citharus

Scientific classification
- Kingdom: Animalia
- Phylum: Chordata
- Class: Actinopterygii
- Division: Teleostei
- Order: Characiformes
- Suborder: Citharinoidei; Buckup, 1993

= Citharinoidei =

Suborder of fishes

Clitharinoidei is a suborder of freshwater ray-finned fishes belonging to the order Characiformes, the order which includes the characins, tetras and related species. The fishes in this taxon are found in Africa.

== Taxonomy ==
Citharinoidei was first proposed as a suborder in 1993 by the Brazilian ichthyologist Paulo Andreas Buckup to include toe African characiform families. Other authorities classify this taxon as a valid order, the Cithariniformes, first proposed by Juan Marcos Mirande in 2017. Eschmeyer's Catalog of Fishes treats this taxon as a suborder of the Characiformes.

== Families ==
The suborder comprises 2 families:

- Citharinidae Günther, 1864 (citharinids)
- Distichodontidae Günther, 1864 (distichodontids)

The following cladogram is based on a 2017 maximum likelihood phylogenetic tree analyzing 5418 bp of Citharinoidei:

- - Citharinoidei
    - Distichodontidae
      - - - - - Nannocharax
              - - - - - Belonophago
                      - Eugnathichthys
                    - Phago
                  - - Eugnathichthys
                    - Microstomatichthyoborus
                - Mesoborus
            - Distichodus
          - - Ichthyborus
            - Hemistichodus
        - Nannaethiops
      - Xenocharax
    - Citharinidae
      Citharinus
  - Characoidei
- Siluriformes
  Ictalurus punctatus
