= Catoprion absconditus =

Conservation status
- Least Concern (IUCN 3.1)

Scientific classification
- Kingdom: Animalia
- Phylum: Chordata
- Class: Actinopterygii
- Order: Characiformes
- Family: Serrasalmidae
- Genus: Catoprion
- Species: C. absconditus

Binomial name
- Catoprion absconditus Bonani Mateussi, Melo & Oliveira, 2020

Species of fish

Catopruion absconditus, which shares the common name wimple piranha with its congener C. mento, is a lepidophagous species of freshwater ray-finned fishes belonging to the family Serrasalmidae, which includes the pacus, piranhas and related fishes. This fish is found in South America in the central and eastern Amazon river system of Brazil and in tributaries of the Essequibo in Guyana.
