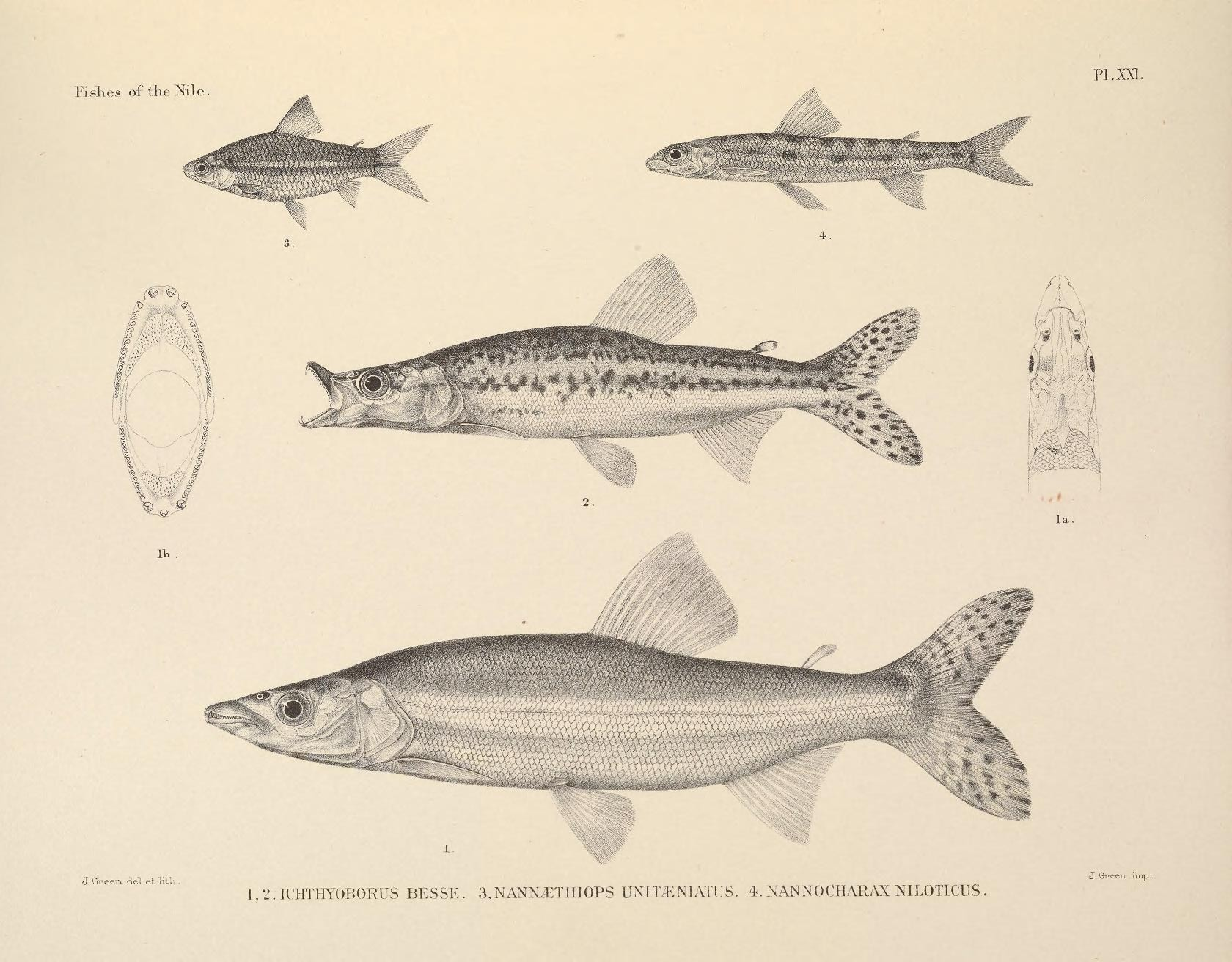
- Ichthyborus besse (middle and bottom), Nannaethiops unitaeniatus (top left), and Nannocharax niloticus (top right)

Scientific classification
- Kingdom: Animalia
- Phylum: Chordata
- Class: Actinopterygii
- Division: Teleostei
- Order: Characiformes
- Family: Distichodontidae
- Genus: Ichthyborus; Günther, 1864

Type species
- Ichthyborus microlepis (a synonym of Characinus besse) Günther, 1864

Synonyms
- Psalidostoma Kner, 1864; Neoborus Boulenger, 1899; Phagoborus Myers, 1924; Gavialocharax Pellegrin, 1927; Onouphrios Whitley, 1951; Ra Whitley, 1931

= Ichthyborus =

Genus of fishes

Ichthyborus is a genus of distichodontid fishes found in tropical Africa. They are piscivores that feed both on (whole) fish and fins of fish.

== Species ==
Ichthyborus contains the following valid species:

- Ichthyborus besse (de Joannis, 1835)
- Ichthyborus monodi (Pellegrin, 1927)
- Ichthyborus ornatus (Boulenger, 1899)
- Ichthyborus quadrilineatus (Pellegrin, 1904)
