= Perissodus eccentricus =

Conservation status
- Least Concern (IUCN 3.1)

Scientific classification
- Kingdom: Animalia
- Phylum: Chordata
- Class: Actinopterygii
- Order: Cichliformes
- Family: Cichlidae
- Genus: Perissodus
- Species: P. eccentricus

Binomial name
- Perissodus eccentricus Liem & D. J. Stewart, 1976

Species of fish

Perissodus eccentricus is a species of cichlid endemic to Lake Tanganyika where it is only known from Zambian waters. It feeds on the scales of other fishes. This species can reach a length of 16.4 centimetres (6.5 in) SL. This species can also be found in the aquarium trade.
