= Perissodus elaviae =

Conservation status
- Least Concern (IUCN 3.1)

Scientific classification
- Kingdom: Animalia
- Phylum: Chordata
- Class: Actinopterygii
- Order: Cichliformes
- Family: Cichlidae
- Genus: Perissodus
- Species: P. elaviae

Binomial name
- Perissodus elaviae (Poll, 1949)

Synonyms
- Plecodus elaviae Poll, 1949

Species of fish

Perissodus elaviae is a species of cichlid endemic to Lake Tanganyika. This schooling species is a scale-eater, plucking scales from other fishes. Both parents care for the offspring in this mouthbrooder. This fish can reach a length of 32 centimetres (13 in) TL.
