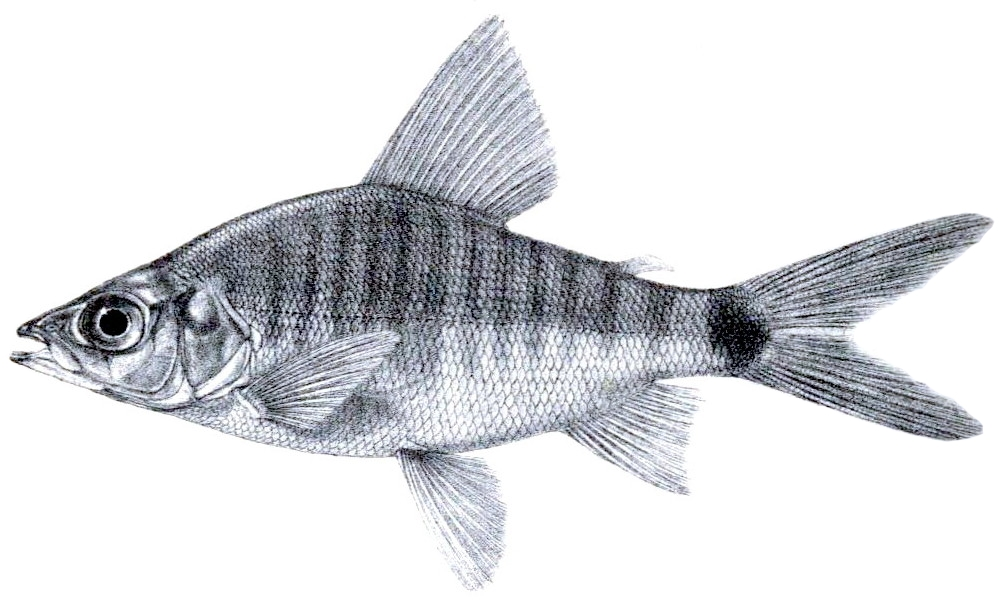

Scientific classification
- Domain: Eukaryota
- Kingdom: Animalia
- Phylum: Chordata
- Class: Actinopterygii
- Order: Characiformes
- Family: Distichodontidae
- Genus: Xenocharax
- Species: X. spilurus

Binomial name
- Xenocharax spilurus Günther, 1867

= Xenocharax spilurus =

Species of fish

Xenocharax spilurus is a species of distichodontid fish found in Cameroon, the Democratic Republic of Congo, and Gabon.
