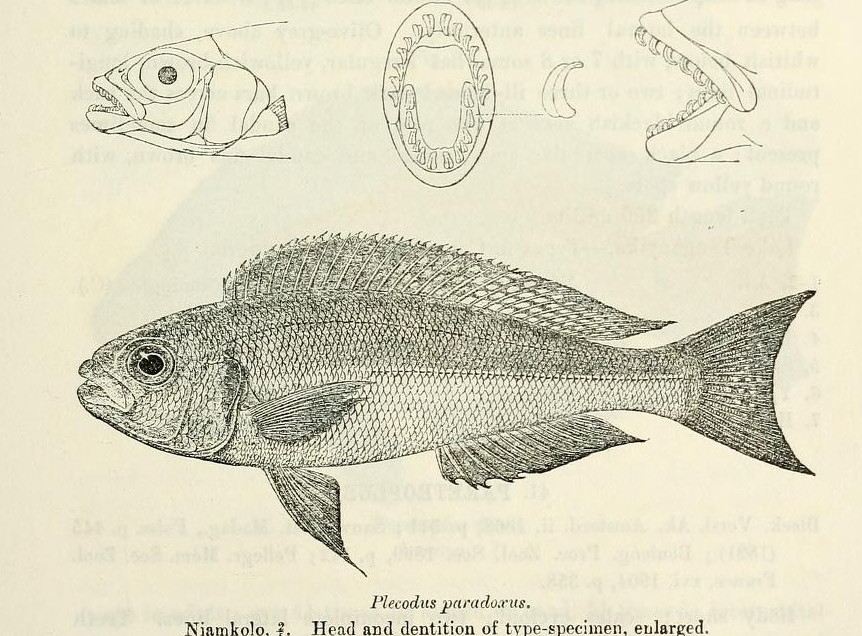

Conservation status
- Least Concern (IUCN 3.1)

Scientific classification
- Kingdom: Animalia
- Phylum: Chordata
- Class: Actinopterygii
- Order: Cichliformes
- Family: Cichlidae
- Genus: Perissodus
- Species: P. paradoxus

Binomial name
- Perissodus paradoxus (Boulenger, 1898)

Synonyms
- Plecodus paradoxus Boulenger, 1898; Plecodus bimaculatus Steindachner, 1909

= Perissodus paradoxus =

Species of fish

Perissodus paradoxus is a species of cichlid endemic to Lake Tanganyika. This fish is a scale-eater, gathering in large schools exceeding 500 individuals and eating the scales of other fish. This species can reach a length of 30 centimetres (12 in) TL.
