= Caprichromis liemi =

Conservation status
- Least Concern (IUCN 3.1)

Scientific classification
- Kingdom: Animalia
- Phylum: Chordata
- Class: Actinopterygii
- Order: Cichliformes
- Family: Cichlidae
- Genus: Caprichromis
- Species: C. liemi

Binomial name
- Caprichromis liemi (McKaye & Mackenzie, 1982)

Synonyms
- Cyrtocara liemi McKaye & Mackenzie, 1982; Maravichromis liemi (McKaye & MacKenzie, 1982)

Species of fish

Caprichromis liemi, the happy, is a species of haplochromine cichlid. It is endemic to the Lake Malawi region, being also found in Lake Malombe and the upper Shire River. It occurs over sandy substrates but it frequently remains in midwater. This species is a specialised predator, a paedophage, which steals the broods from mouthbrooding female cichlids by ramming the brooding female's head from below. Examination of their stomach contents resulted in the recovery of eggs, larvae and fry only. The juveniles act a cleaner fish, and so may the adults. The males build "sand castle" spawning sites. The specific name honours the Indonesian ichthyologist Karel F. Liem (1935–2009), in recognition of his studies of cichlids.
