= Caprichromis orthognathus =

Conservation status
- Least Concern (IUCN 3.1)

Scientific classification
- Kingdom: Animalia
- Phylum: Chordata
- Class: Actinopterygii
- Order: Cichliformes
- Family: Cichlidae
- Genus: Caprichromis
- Species: C. orthognathus

Binomial name
- Caprichromis orthognathus (Trewavas, 1935)

Synonyms
- Haplochromis orthognathus Trewavas, 1935; Cyrtocara orthognathus (Trewavas, 1935); Mylochromis orthognathus (Trewavas, 1935)

Species of fish

Caprichromis orthognathus is a species of haplochromine cichlid.

It is found in Lake Malawi and Lake Malombe and its range includes Malawi, Mozambique, and Tanzania. It is most commonly recorded off sandy beaches at depths of around 15 metres (49 ft) although it can be found in either shallow or deep water. It usually remains in midwater, sometimes over rocks. It is reported to be a paedophage, ramming the heads of mouth-brooding female cichlids from underneath.
