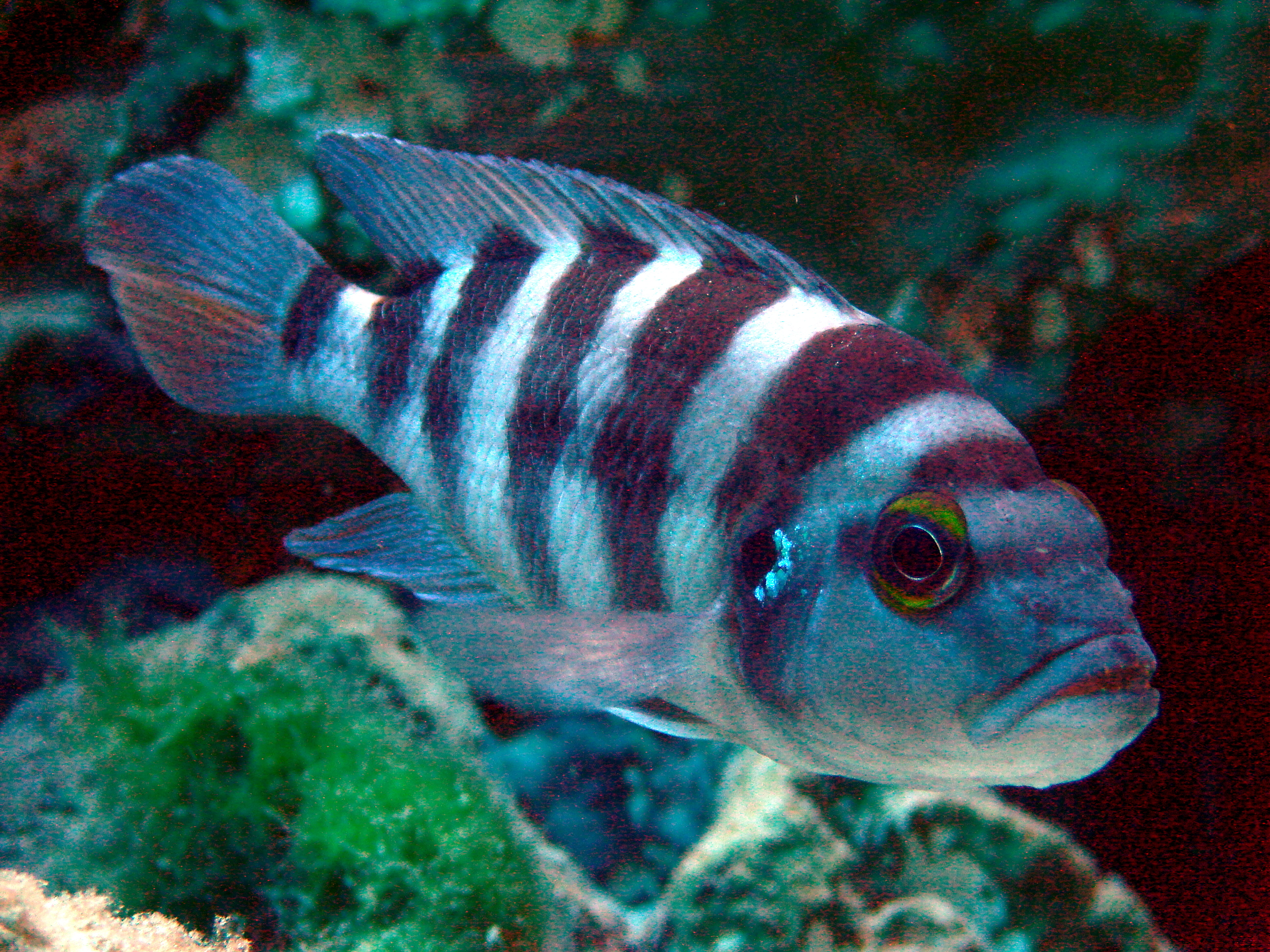

Conservation status
- Least Concern (IUCN 3.1)

Scientific classification
- Kingdom: Animalia
- Phylum: Chordata
- Class: Actinopterygii
- Order: Cichliformes
- Family: Cichlidae
- Genus: Neolamprologus
- Species: N. sexfasciatus

Binomial name
- Neolamprologus sexfasciatus (Trewavas & Poll, 1952)

Synonyms
- Lamprologus sexfasciatus Trewavas & Poll, 1952

= Neolamprologus sexfasciatus =

Species of fish

Neolamprologus sexfasciatus is a species of cichlid fish that is endemic to the southern half of Lake Tanganyika in East Africa. It can reach a length of 15 centimetres (5.9 in) TL. This species can also be found in the aquarium trade. It mainly eats snails, and its pharyngeal bones and teeth are adapted to this hard-shelled prey.

An aggressive mimic of this species is Plecodus straeleni, a scale-eating cichlid that is able to approach its victims by resembling a harmless species.
