= Perissodus multidentatus =

Conservation status
- Least Concern (IUCN 3.1)

Scientific classification
- Kingdom: Animalia
- Phylum: Chordata
- Class: Actinopterygii
- Order: Cichliformes
- Family: Cichlidae
- Genus: Perissodus
- Species: P. multidentatus

Binomial name
- Perissodus multidentatus (Poll, 1952)

Synonyms
- Plecodus multidentatus Poll, 1952

Species of fish

Perissodus multidentatus is a species of cichlid endemic to Lake Tanganyika. This species is a scale-eater, eating the scales off of other fishes. This species can reach a length of 12 centimetres (4.7 in) TL.
