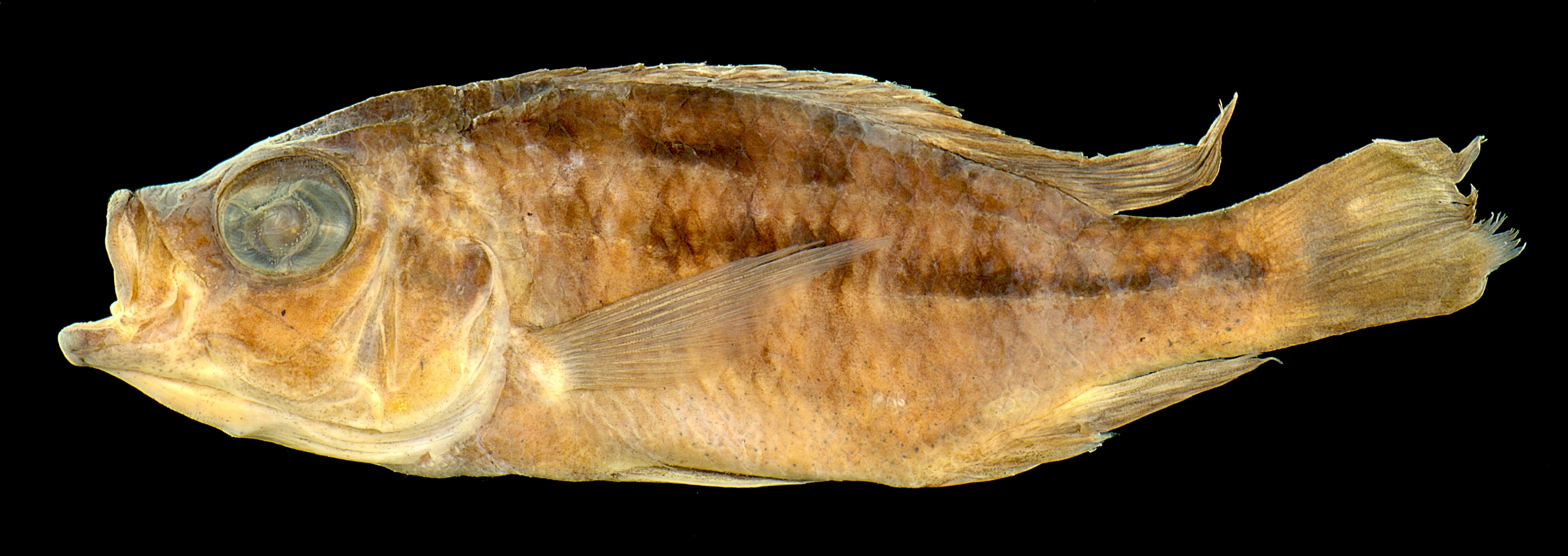
- Hemitaeniochromis brachyrhynchus (holotype)

Conservation status
- Least Concern (IUCN 3.1)

Scientific classification
- Kingdom: Animalia
- Phylum: Chordata
- Class: Actinopterygii
- Order: Cichliformes
- Family: Cichlidae
- Genus: Hemitaeniochromis
- Species: H. brachyrhynchus

Binomial name
- Hemitaeniochromis brachyrhynchus M. K. Oliver, 2012

= Hemitaeniochromis brachyrhynchus =

Species of fish

Hemitaeniochromis brachyrhynchus is a species of fish in the family Cichlidae. Its specific epithet brachyrhynchus (meaning: short snout) refers to the most distinctive characteristic of this species, the reduced length of the head in front of the eye (Oliver 2012: 42). Prior to the formal description of this species in 2012, the specimen which became the paratype was provisionally called Hemitaeniochromis sp. 'insignis big eye' (Snoeks & Hanssens 2004: 284 & fig. 52); however, the species has no accepted common name.

This species is suspected of being paedophagous, because it shares attributes of its dentition, a heavy dentary or lower jaw, and thickened oral mucous membrane in which the teeth are buried, all characteristics found especially in other known paedophagous cichlids (Oliver 2012: 45). However, this diet has not been confirmed since neither behavioral observation nor analysis of its stomach contents has been possible.

It has been found only at two widely separated localities in Malawi, Thumbi Island West at Cape Maclear and Nkhata Bay. It occurs in the deeper, rocky habitats of Lake Malawi, and is unknown in the aquarium trade.
