= Neolebias axelrodi =

Conservation status
- Endangered (IUCN 3.1)

Scientific classification
- Kingdom: Animalia
- Phylum: Chordata
- Class: Actinopterygii
- Division: Teleostei
- Order: Characiformes
- Family: Distichodontidae
- Genus: Neolebias
- Species: N. axelrodi

Binomial name
- Neolebias axelrodi Poll & Gosse, 1963

Species of freshwater fish

Neolebias axelrodi is a small species of freshwater fish native to West Africa. N. axelrodi is one of four West African Neolebias species (N. ansorgii, N. unifasciatus, N.powelli, and N. axelrodi). Neolebias comes from neo (Greek for new) and lebias (Greek for small fish). The species, axelrodi, is named after Dr. Herbert Axelrod, an ichthyologist known for his contributions to the study of tropical fish.

== Description ==
Neolebias axelrodi is distinguishable from other west African Neolebias species by a brown longitudinal line, which starts at the operculum and ends right before passing the anal fin. The dark brown line is situated near the middle row of scales. The maximum observed size of Neolebias axelrodi is 18.3mm.

== Range ==
This species has only been described in four locations: a spring 30km away from Lagos, the Azumini River near Azumini (Nigeria), the New Caliber River near Elele Alimini (Niger Delta), and Port Novo (Benin). The species is considered endangered, largely due to agriculture, urban development, deforestation, and oil exploration.
