= Perissodus straeleni =

Conservation status
- Least Concern (IUCN 3.1)

Scientific classification
- Kingdom: Animalia
- Phylum: Chordata
- Class: Actinopterygii
- Order: Cichliformes
- Family: Cichlidae
- Genus: Perissodus
- Species: P. straeleni

Binomial name
- Perissodus straeleni (Poll, 1948)

Synonyms
- Plecodus straeleni Poll, 1948

Species of fish

Perissodus straeleni is a species of cichlid fish that is endemic to Lake Tanganyika in East Africa. This species can reach a total length of 16 centimetres (6.3 in).

Like all species of Perissodus, this fish is a scale-eater. Unlike other members of its genus, it has a distinctive striped pattern and closely resembles the harmless Neolamprologus sexfasciatus. It uses this aggressive mimicry to be able to approach unsuspecting fish and rapidly take a mouthful of scales. It also resembles the larger Cyphotilapia and has been recorded swimming among their schools, but this may be protective rather than aggressive mimicry. Although it may attack the species it mimics, most victims are other species and under some circumstances it will feed on fish eggs.

The specific name honours the Belgian paleontologist and carcinologist Victor van Straelen (1889-1964) who was Director of the Royal Belgian Institute of Natural Sciences.
