= Neolebias lozii =

Conservation status
- Critically Endangered (IUCN 3.1)

Scientific classification
- Kingdom: Animalia
- Phylum: Chordata
- Class: Actinopterygii
- Order: Characiformes
- Family: Distichodontidae
- Genus: Neolebias
- Species: N. lozii

Binomial name
- Neolebias lozii Winemiller & Kelso-Winemiller, 1993

Species of fish

Neolebias lozii, the banded neolebias, is a species of freshwater ray-finned fish within the family Distichodontidae. It is found in Africa within Zambia, inhabiting the tributary of the Kataba River, the Sianda stream, and a small tributary system in upper Zambia that joins the eastern side of the Barotse Floodplain. The species inhabits small streams near seasonally flooded plains that are bordered by open woodlands, living under dense floating mats of vegetation and emergent vegetation. It feeds on small aquatic invertebrates and grows to a length of 1.8 centimetres (0.71 in).

== Conservation ==
The population of Neolebias lozii is currently unknown as specimens are rare, with the type series having only 6 specimens, and only 19 specimens of the type locality being caught. Because of this there is no estimation of the current population size available, but is believed to be low due to its restricted range and little number of individuals being found. Threats of the species include urban development, agriculture, dams, modifications to the ecosystem, pollution, and droughts. The Kataba River is canalised upstream where the type locality are located, and no N. lozii specimens were found in the canalised section. The river faces similar threats to the Sianda stream, which was also canalised, likely to aid in agricultural drainage. The area around its range is increasing in human population, leading to an intensification of agriculture, water usage, and well as deforestation in nearby woodlands bordering dambos. Pollution by fertilizer and herbicides that leak into the water are likely to threaten the environment. The Kataba River's flow is sustained by a large headwater swamp, and reduction in flow due to groundwater abstraction is seen as a potential threat, although this is not seen taking effect in the near future. No invasive fish currently occur in the species range, although the Nile tilapia is considered to be a major threat, likely to invade the area from the Zambezi River. There are currently no conservation efforts towards the species.

Due to the species restricted range, difficulty in finding, decline in habitat quality, unknown population, and the major threats it faces, it has been classified as a 'critically endangered' species by the IUCN Red List.
