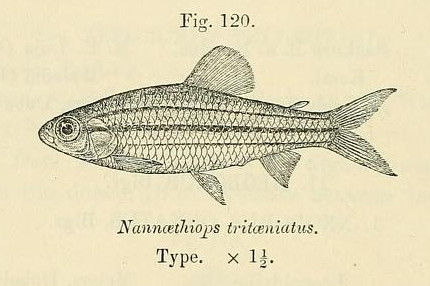
- Neolebias trilineatus

Scientific classification
- Domain: Eukaryota
- Kingdom: Animalia
- Phylum: Chordata
- Class: Actinopterygii
- Order: Characiformes
- Family: Distichodontidae
- Genus: Neolebias; Steindachner, 1894

Type species
- Neolebias unifasciatus Steindachner, 1894

Synonyms
- Rhabdaethiops Fowler, 1936; Micraethiops Daget, 1965

= Neolebias =

Genus of fishes

Neolebias is a genus of small distichodontid freshwater fishes found in Africa.

== Species ==
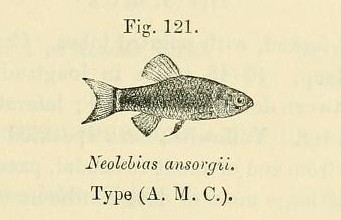
Neolebias ansorgii

There currently 12 recognized species:

- Neolebias ansorgii Boulenger, 1912
- Neolebias axelrodi Poll & J. P. Gosse, 1963
- Neolebias gossei ([Poll & J. G. Lambert, 1964)
- Neolebias gracilis Matthes, 1964
- Neolebias kerguennae Daget, 1980
- Neolebias lozii Winemiller & Kelso-Winemiller, 1993 (banded neolebias)
- Neolebias philippei Poll & Gosse, 1963
- Neolebias powelli Teugels & T. R. Roberts, 1990
- Neolebias spilotaenia Boulenger, 1912
- Neolebias trewavasae Poll & Gosse, 1963
- Neolebias trilineatus Boulenger, 1899 (three-line tetra)
- Neolebias unifasciatus Steindachner, 1894
