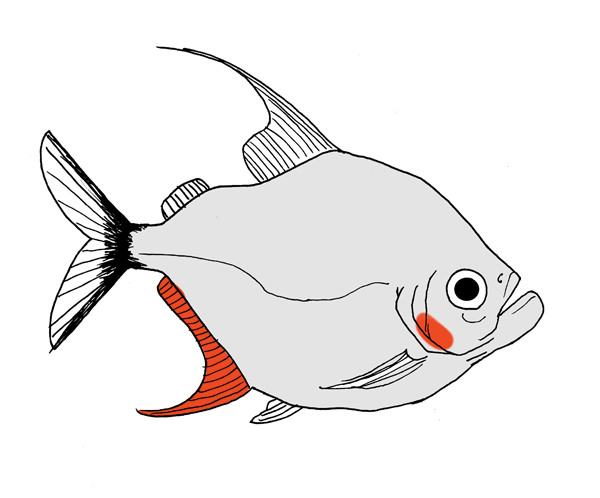
- Catoprion mento

Scientific classification
- Kingdom: Animalia
- Phylum: Chordata
- Class: Actinopterygii
- Order: Characiformes
- Family: Serrasalmidae
- Subfamily: Serrasalminae
- Genus: Catoprion; Müller & Troschel, 1844

Type species
- Serrasalmus mento Cuvier 1819

Species
- 2, see text

= Catoprion =

Fish genus native to South America

Catoprion is a genus of freshwater ray-finned fishes belonging to the family Serrasalmidae, which includes the pacus, piranhas and related fishes. These fishes are found in tropical South America, including the basins of the Amazon, Essequibo, Orinoco and Paraguay rivers. It was believed to be a monotypic genus until the 2020 description of C. absconditus.

== Species ==
There are 2 described species:

- Catoprion mento (G. Cuvier, 1819)
- Catoprion absconditus Bonani Mateussi, Melo & Oliveira, 2020
