= Sternarchella schotti =

Conservation status
- Least Concern (IUCN 3.1)

Scientific classification
- Kingdom: Animalia
- Phylum: Chordata
- Class: Actinopterygii
- Order: Gymnotiformes
- Family: Apteronotidae
- Genus: Sternarchella
- Species: S. schotti

Binomial name
- Sternarchella schotti (Steindachner, 1868)

Synonyms
- Sternarchus schotti Steindachner, 1868; Sternarchus capanemae Steindachner, 1868; Porotergus terminalis C. H. Eigenmann & W. R. Allen, 1942; Sternarchella terminalis (C. H. Eigenmann & W. R. Allen, 1942)

Species of fish

Sternarchella schotti, the sarapó, is a species of freshwater ray-fiinned fish belonging to the family Apteronotidae, the ghost knifefishes. This species is found in the Amazon and Orinoco river systems in South America.

== Taxonomy ==
Sternarchella schotti was first formally described as Sternarchus schotti in 1868 by the Austrian ichthyologist Franz Steindachner with its type locality given as Manaus. Steindachner actually described two species from the same specimen, he described Sternarchus capenemae in the abstract but S. schotti in the full text. S. capenemae is now regarded as a nomen oblitum under article 23.9.1 of the International Code of Zoological Nomenclature. In 1905 Carl H. Eigenmann proposed the new genus Sternarchella, designating Sternarchus schotti as its type species. The genus Sternarchella is classified within the subfamily Apteronotinae of the family Apteronotidae within the order Gymnotiformes.

== Etymology ==
Sternarchus schotti is the type species of the genus Sternarchella, a name which suffixes -ella, a diminutive, onto Sternarchus, the genus this species was originally classified in. This refers to the short snout and smaller mouth of S. schotti. The person honoured in the specific name, schotti, was not named by Steindachner but it is most likely to be the Austrian botanist Heinrich Wilhelm Schott, who was a member of the Austrian Brazil expedition of 1817-1821, on which the type of S. schotti was collected.

== Description ==
Sternarchella schotti is told apart from other species in the genus Sternarchella by the possession of a large eye which has a diameter equivalent to between 7% and 10% of the length of the head, most other species, except S. patriciae, having eyes that are between 6% and 9% of the head length. The third basibranchial is ossified and this speciesd has 4 or 5 curved displaced hemal spines. The swim bladder is elongated reaching past the rear limit of the body cavity. This species has a maximum total length of 40 cm (16 in). The colour of this species when preserved in alcohol is yellowish brown with a darker stripe along the back.

== Distribution and habitat ==
Sternarchella schotti is a benthopelagic fish which has a wide range in the deep channels of the Amazon and Orinoco basins in Bolivia, Brazil, Colombia, Peru and Venezuela.
