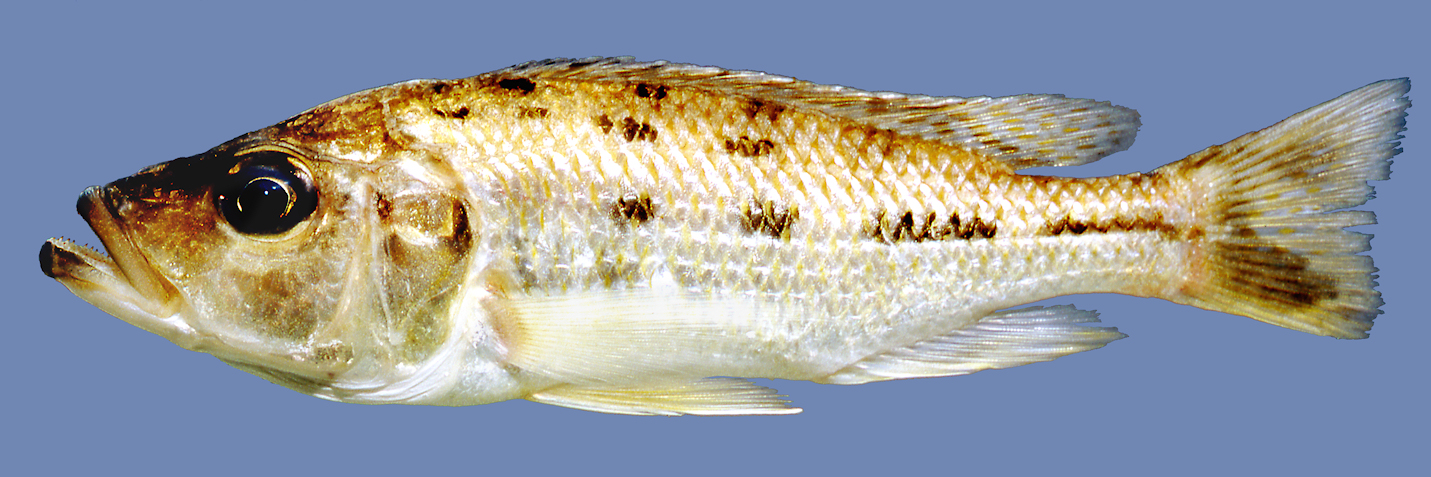

Conservation status
- Least Concern (IUCN 3.1)

Scientific classification
- Kingdom: Animalia
- Phylum: Chordata
- Class: Actinopterygii
- Order: Cichliformes
- Family: Cichlidae
- Genus: Hemitaeniochromis
- Species: H. urotaenia

Binomial name
- Hemitaeniochromis urotaenia (Regan, 1922)

Synonyms
- Haplochromis urotaenia Regan, 1922; Cyrtocara urotaenia (Regan, 1922); Protomelas urotaenia (Regan, 1922)

= Hemitaeniochromis urotaenia =

Species of fish

Hemitaeniochromis urotaenia is a species of fish endemic to Lake Malawi in East Africa. It is the type species of the genus Hemitaeniochromis, and is part of family Cichlidae in subfamily Pseudocrenilabrinae and the tribe Haplochromini.

== See also ==
- Cichlid
