= Caprichromis =

Scientific classification
- Kingdom: Animalia
- Phylum: Chordata
- Class: Actinopterygii
- Order: Cichliformes
- Family: Cichlidae
- Subfamily: Pseudocrenilabrinae
- Tribe: Haplochromini
- Genus: Caprichromis; Eccles & Trewavas, 1989

Type species
- Haplochromis orthognathus Trewavas, 1935

Genus of fishes

Caprichromis is a small genus of haplochromine cichlids endemic to Lake Malawi in East Africa. This genus contains noted paedophagous cichlids, specialising in the eating of eggs and fry of other cichlid species.

== Species ==
There are currently two recognized species in this genus:

- Caprichromis liemi (McKaye & Mackenzie, 1982) (Happy)
- Caprichromis orthognathus (Trewavas, 1935)
