= Sternarchella =

Scientific classification
- Kingdom: Animalia
- Phylum: Chordata
- Class: Actinopterygii
- Division: Teleostei
- Order: Gymnotiformes
- Family: Apteronotidae
- Subfamily: Apteronotinae
- Genus: Sternarchella; C. H. Eigenmann, 1905

Type species
- Sternarchus schotti Steindachner, 1868

Genus of fishes

Sternarchella, the bulldog knifefishes, is a genus of ghost knifefishes found at depths of 2–50 m (7–164 ft) in the main channel of large rivers in South America. Most are from the Amazon basin, but S. orthos is found both in the Amazon and Orinoco, S. orinoco is restricted to the Orinoco and S. curvioperculata restricted to the upper Paraná basin (however, the last species likely belongs in another genus, possibly Apteronotus). They are often common in their habitat.

They have a blunt or pointed snout (none have the greatly elongated snout found in some other knifefish), reduced pigmentation and reach up to 18.5–40.5 cm (7.3–15.9 in) in total length depending on the species. They feed on invertebrates and small fish.

== Species ==
The following species are currently placed in this genus. Two species that formerly comprised their own genus Magosternarchus were recently included in Sternarchella

- Sternarchella calhamazon Lundberg, Cox Fernandes, Campos-da-Paz & Sullivan, 2013
- Sternarchella duccis Lundberg, Cox Fernandes & Albert, 1996
- Sternarchella orinoco Mago-Leccia, 1994
- Sternarchella orthos Mago-Leccia, 1994
- Sternarchella patriciae K. M. Evans, Crampton & Albert, 2017
- Sternarchella raptor Lundberg, Cox Fernandes & Albert, 1996
- Sternarchella rex Evans, Crampton & Albert, 2017
- Sternarchella schotti (Steindachner, 1868)
- Sternarchella sima Starks, 1913
