= Congocharax =

Conservation status
- Least Concern (IUCN 3.1)

Scientific classification
- Kingdom: Animalia
- Phylum: Chordata
- Class: Actinopterygii
- Order: Characiformes
- Family: Distichodontidae
- Genus: Congocharax; Matthes, 1964
- Species: C. olbrechtsi

Binomial name
- Congocharax olbrechtsi (Poll, 1954)

Synonyms
- Hemigrammocharax olbrechtsi Poll, 1954; Neolebias olbrechtsi (Poll 1954)

Genus of fishes

Congocharax is a monospecific genus of freshwater ray-finned fish belonging to the family Distichodontidae. The only species in this genus is Congocharax olbrechtsi, a fish which is found in the central basin of the Congo River in the Democratic Republic of Congo.
