= Dundocharax =

Conservation status
- Data Deficient (IUCN 3.1)

Scientific classification
- Kingdom: Animalia
- Phylum: Chordata
- Class: Actinopterygii
- Order: Characiformes
- Family: Distichodontidae
- Genus: Dundocharax; Poll, 1967
- Species: D. bidentatus

Binomial name
- Dundocharax bidentatus Poll, 1967

Species of fish

Dundocharax is a monospecific genus of freshwater ray-finned fish belonging to the family Distichodontidae. The only species in this genus is Dundocharax bidentatus which is endemic to the Lucoge River, a tributary of the Kasai River in the Congo drainage in Angola. This is a pelagic fish which has a maximum standard length of 1.9 cm (0.75 in).
