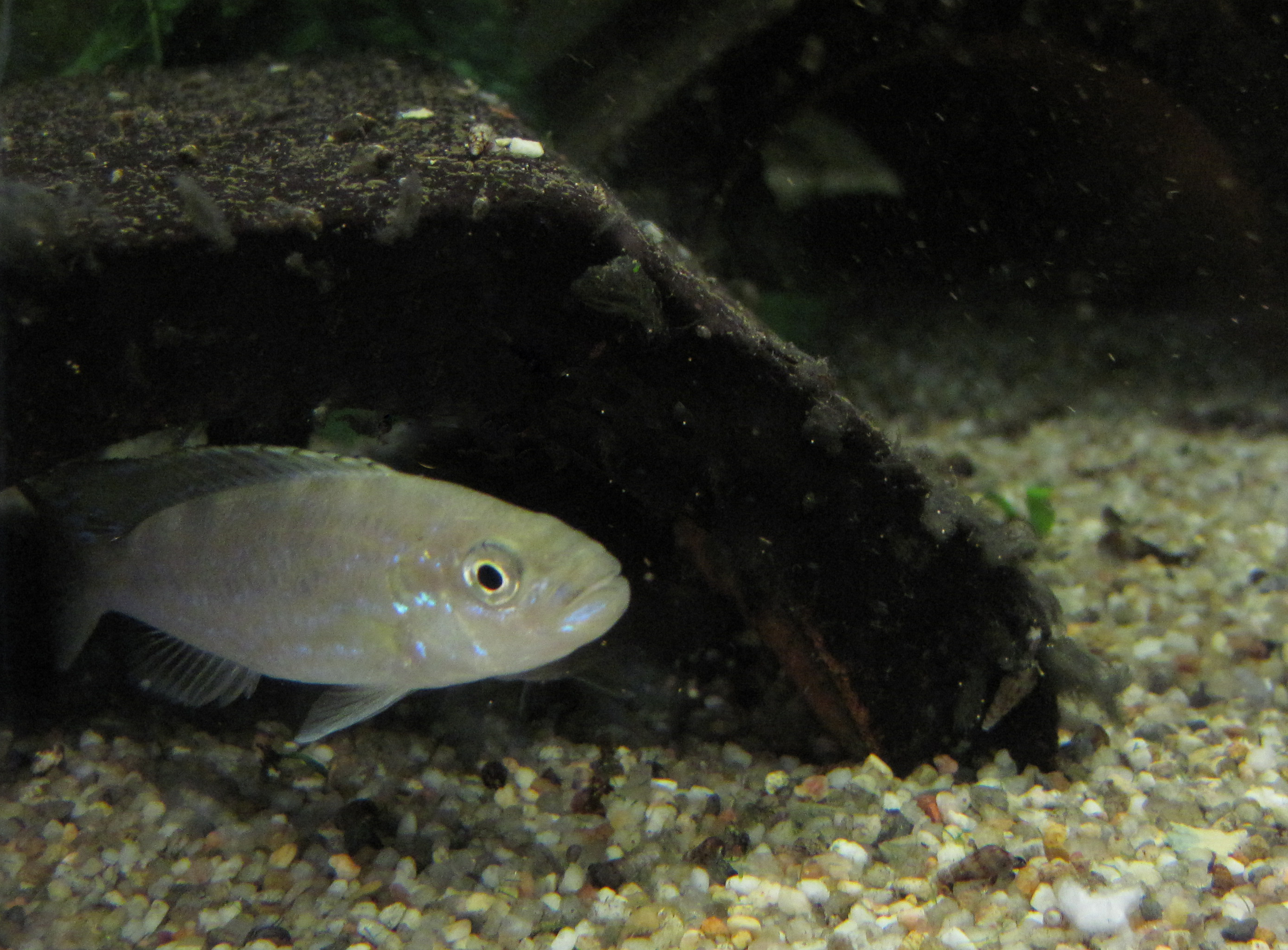
- Perissodus microlepis

Scientific classification
- Kingdom: Animalia
- Phylum: Chordata
- Class: Actinopterygii
- Order: Cichliformes
- Family: Cichlidae
- Tribe: Perissodini
- Genus: Perissodus; Boulenger, 1898

Type species
- Perissodus microlepis Boulenger, 1898

Synonyms
- Plecodus Boulenger, 1898

= Perissodus =

Genus of fishes

Perissodus is a genus of cichlids endemic to Lake Tanganyika in Africa. They feed on scales.

== Species ==
There are currently six recognized species in this genus:

- Perissodus eccentricus Liem & D. J. Stewart, 1976
- Perissodus elaviae (Poll, 1949)
- Perissodus microlepis Boulenger, 1898
- Perissodus multidentatus (Poll, 1952)
- Perissodus paradoxus (Boulenger, 1898)
- Perissodus straeleni (Poll, 1948)

P. elaviae, P. multidentatus, P. paradoxus & P. straeleni were formerly allocated to Plecodus
