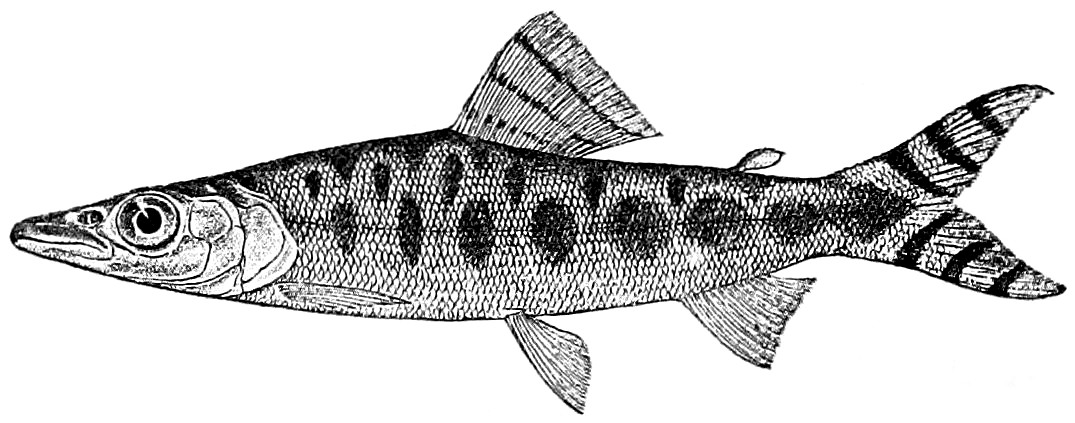

Conservation status
- Least Concern (IUCN 3.1)

Scientific classification
- Kingdom: Animalia
- Phylum: Chordata
- Class: Actinopterygii
- Order: Characiformes
- Family: Distichodontidae
- Genus: Mesoborus; Pellegrin, 1900
- Species: M. crocodilus

Binomial name
- Mesoborus crocodilus Pellegrin, 1900

Synonyms
- Champsoborus pellegrini Boulenger, 1909

= Mesoborus =

Species of fish

Mesoborus is a monospecific genus of freshwater ray-finned fish belonging to the family Distichodontidae. The only species in this genus is Mesoborus crocodilus It reaches up to 25 cm (9.8 in) in standard length. It is a specialized fish-eater (not a fin-eater, as some of the relatives). It hunts by waiting motionless at the surface and then charges at prey (ambush predator). Mesoborus crocodilus is often referred to as the crocodile tetra though is not official.
