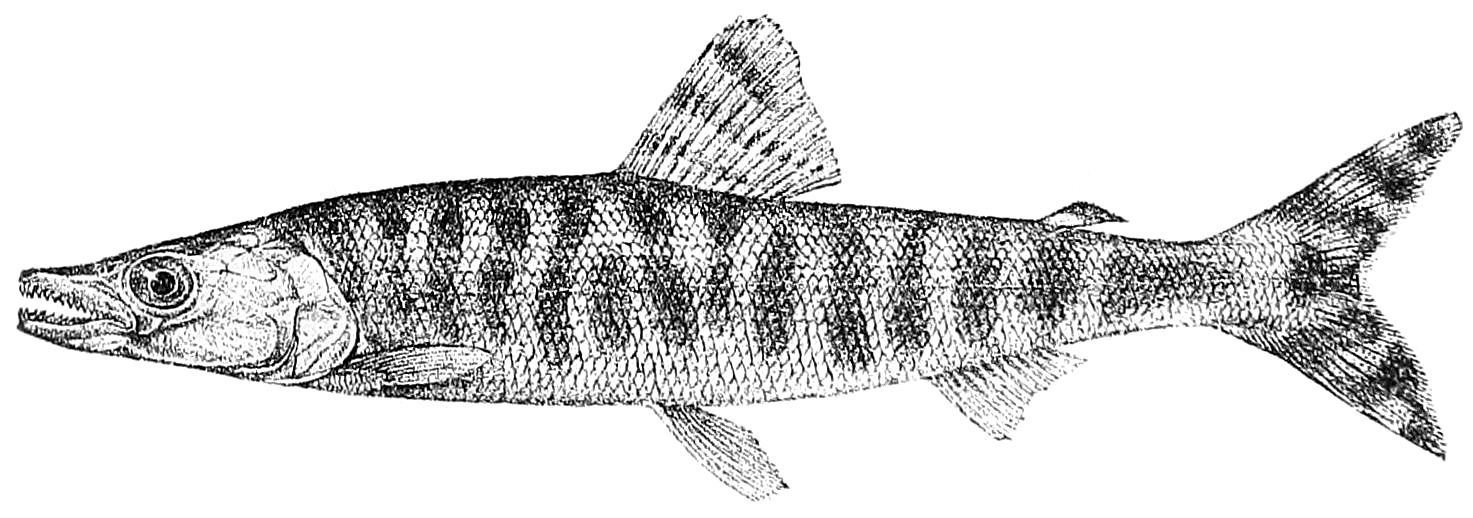

Conservation status
- Data Deficient (IUCN 3.1)

Scientific classification
- Kingdom: Animalia
- Phylum: Chordata
- Class: Actinopterygii
- Order: Characiformes
- Family: Distichodontidae
- Genus: Paraphago; Boulenger, 1899
- Species: P. rostratus

Binomial name
- Paraphago rostratus Boulenger, 1899

= Paraphago =

Species of fish

Paraphago is a monospecific genus of freshwater ray-finned fish belonging to the family Distichodontidae. The only species in this genus is Paraphago rostratus . A species endemic to the Democratic Republic of Congo.
