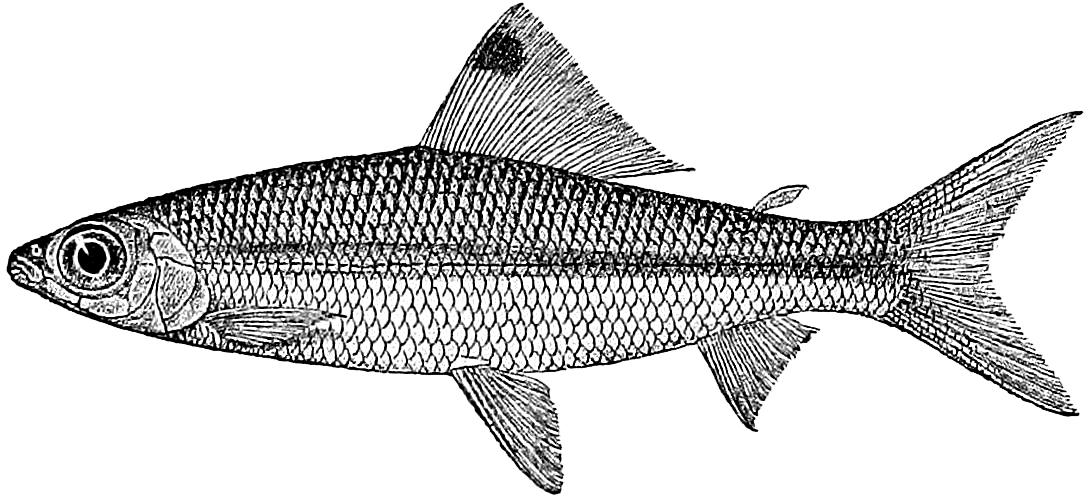

Conservation status
- Least Concern (IUCN 3.1)

Scientific classification
- Kingdom: Animalia
- Phylum: Chordata
- Class: Actinopterygii
- Order: Characiformes
- Family: Distichodontidae
- Genus: Paradistichodus; Pellegrin, 1922
- Species: P. dimidiatus

Binomial name
- Paradistichodus dimidiatus (Pellegrin, 1904)

Synonyms
- Nannocharax dimidiatus Pellegrin, 1904; Distichodus ansorgii Boulenger, 1911; Paradistichodus elegans Pellegrin, 1922

= Paradistichodus =

Species of fish

Paradistichodus is a monospecific genus of freshwater ray-finned fish belonging to the family Distichodontidae. The only species in this genus is Paradistichodus dimidiatus, this fish occurs in West Africa, in the catchment of Lake Chad, as well as the drainages of the Gambia, Casamance, Corubal, Niger and Volta.
