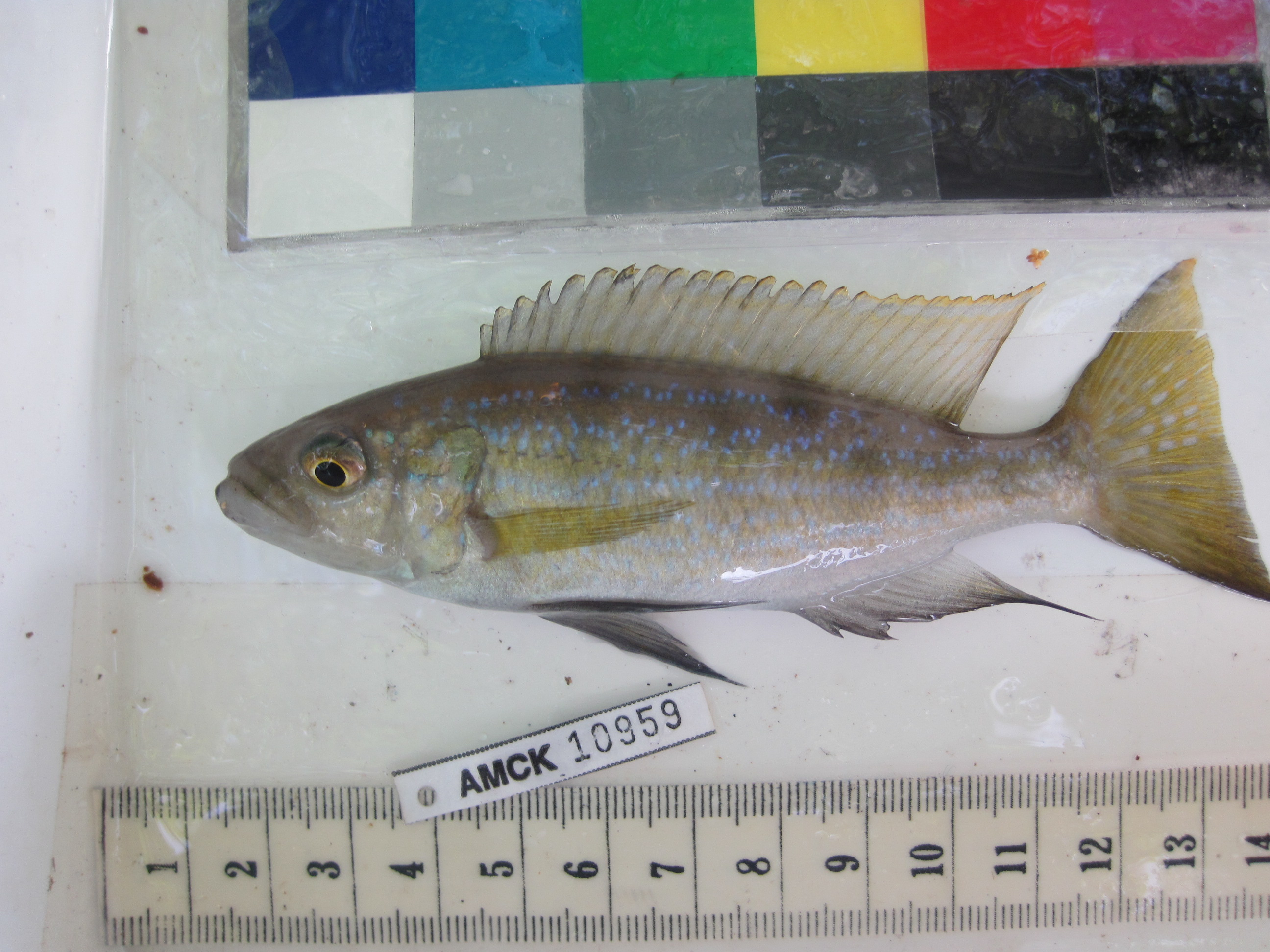
- Adult male
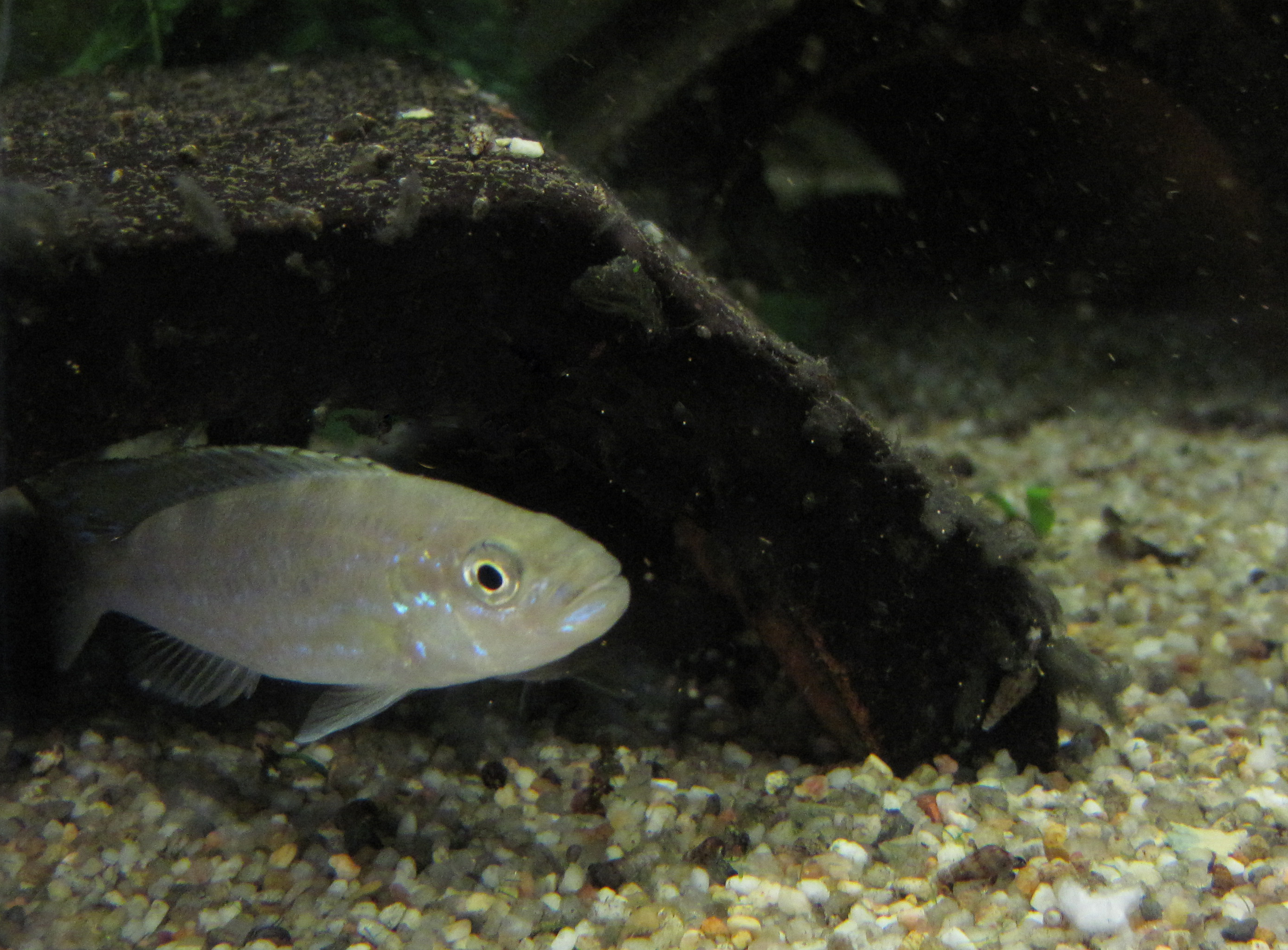
- Juvenile

Conservation status
- Least Concern (IUCN 3.1)

Scientific classification
- Kingdom: Animalia
- Phylum: Chordata
- Class: Actinopterygii
- Order: Cichliformes
- Family: Cichlidae
- Genus: Perissodus
- Species: P. microlepis

Binomial name
- Perissodus microlepis Boulenger, 1898

Synonyms
- Perissodus burgeoni L. R. David, 1936; Perissodus gracilis G. S. Myers, 1936

= Perissodus microlepis =

Species of fish

Perissodus microlepis is a species of cichlid endemic to Lake Tanganyika. It can also be found in the aquarium trade. This species reaches a length of 11 centimetres (4.3 in) TL. It is a scale-eating 'parasite' on other fish species. It occurs in two distinct morphological forms. One morph has mouth parts twisted to the left, enabling it to eat scales off its victim's right flank. In contrast, the other morph, whose mouth is twisted to the right, eats scales off its victim's left flank. The relative abundance of the two morphs in populations is regulated by frequency-dependent selection.

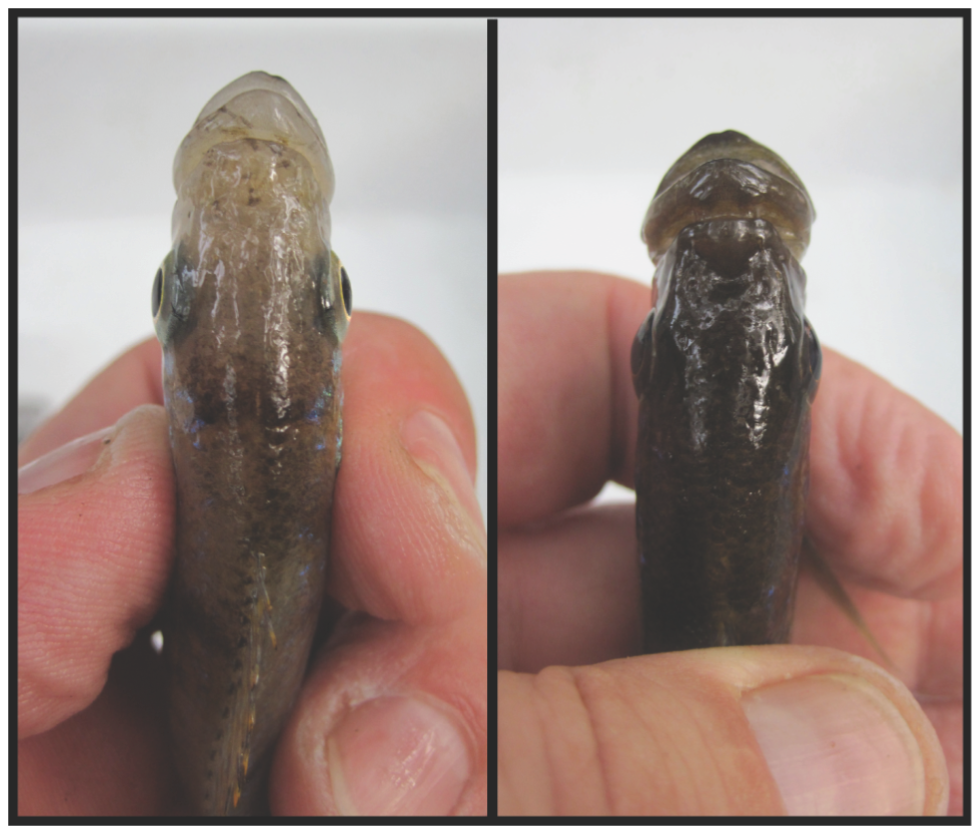
Dorsal view of right-bending (left) and left-bending (right) mouth morphs

Predation behaviour of a right-bending mouth morph
