= Haplochromis welcommei =

Conservation status
- Vulnerable (IUCN 3.1)

Scientific classification
- Kingdom: Animalia
- Phylum: Chordata
- Class: Actinopterygii
- Order: Cichliformes
- Family: Cichlidae
- Genus: Haplochromis
- Species: H. welcommei

Binomial name
- Haplochromis welcommei Greenwood, 1966

Synonyms
- Allochromis welcommei (Greenwood, 1966)

Species of fish

Haplochromis welcommei is a threatened species of cichlid endemic to Lake Victoria in Africa. This species reaches a length of 10.5 centimetres (4.1 in) SL. Although further surveys are needed to confirm its status, it is considered possibly extinct by the IUCN on the basis that there have been no definite records since 1985.

It is the only scale-eating cichlid in the Lake Victoria system.

The specific name honours Robin Welcomme, who was a fisheries biologist at the East African Freshwater Fisheries Research Organisation and who collected the type of this species.
