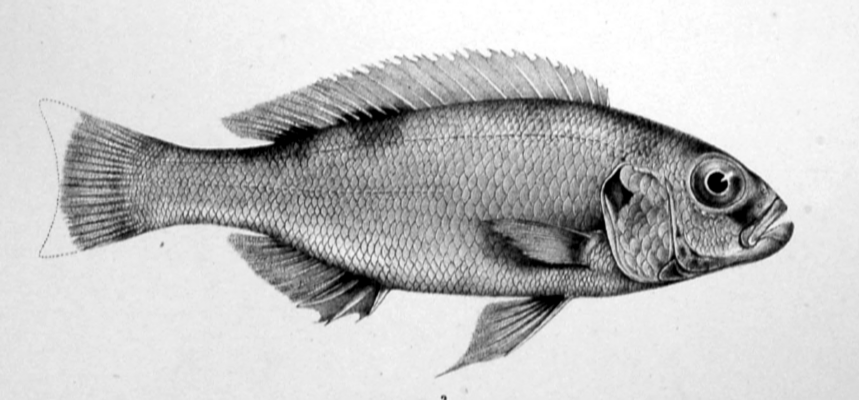
- Illustration from Boulenger's species description (1899)

Conservation status
- Data Deficient (IUCN 3.1)

Scientific classification
- Kingdom: Animalia
- Phylum: Chordata
- Class: Actinopterygii
- Order: Cichliformes
- Family: Cichlidae
- Genus: Xenochromis; Boulenger, 1899
- Species: X. hecqui

Binomial name
- Xenochromis hecqui Boulenger, 1899

Synonyms
- Perissodus hecqui (Boulenger, 1899)

= Xenochromis =

Genus of fishes

Xenochromis hecqui is a species of cichlid endemic to Lake Tanganyika in East Africa. It is mainly found at depths of 6–100 m (20–328 ft), but has been recorded somewhat deeper, even in waters virtually devoid of oxygen. This species is a scale eater, consuming the scales off of other fishes, but will also feed on copepods. It can reach a total length of up to 30 cm (12 in). Currently it is the only known member of its genus.

Its specific name honours the Belgian Lieutenant Célestin Hecq (1859–1910), a member of the Belgian colonial forces fighting the slave trade who collected the type of this species.
