= Microstomatichthyoborus =

Scientific classification
- Kingdom: Animalia
- Phylum: Chordata
- Class: Actinopterygii
- Order: Characiformes
- Family: Distichodontidae
- Genus: Microstomatichthyoborus; Nichols & Griscom, 1917

Type species
- Microstomatichthyoborus bashforddeani Nichols & Griscom, 1917

Synonyms
- Tristichodus Boulenger, 1920

Genus of fishes

Microstomatichthyoborus is a genus of freshwater ray-finned fishes belonging to the family Distichodontidae. The fishes in this genus are endemic to the Democratic Republic of Congo.

== Species ==
The currently described species in this genus are:

- Microstomatichthyoborus bashforddeani Nichols & Griscom, 1917
- Microstomatichthyoborus katangae L. R. David & Poll, 1937
