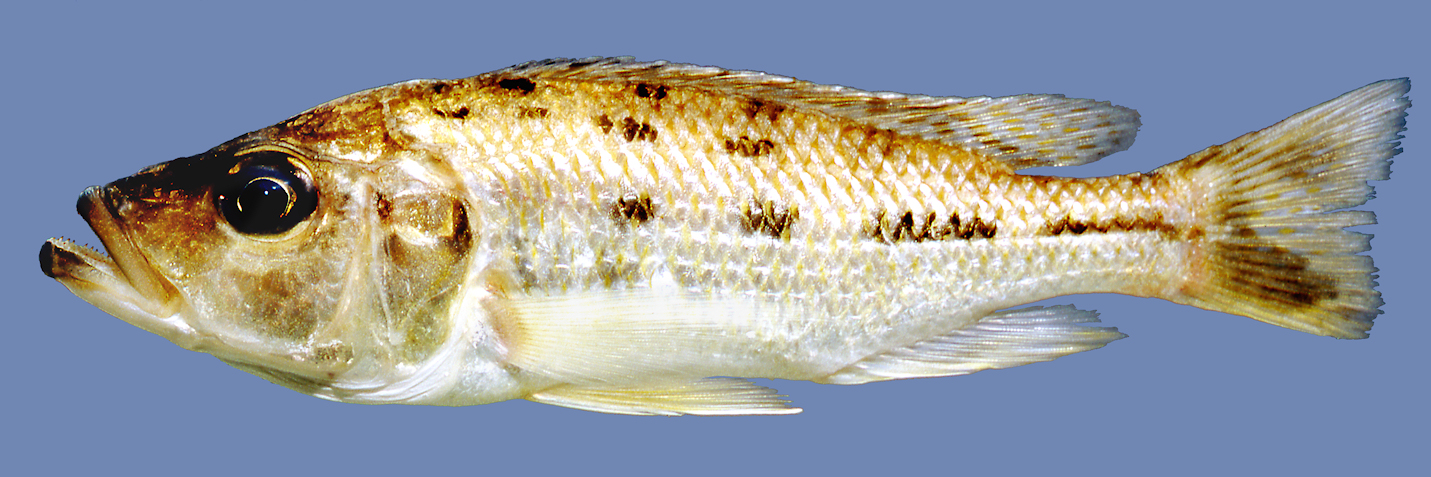
- H. urotaenia

Scientific classification
- Kingdom: Animalia
- Phylum: Chordata
- Class: Actinopterygii
- Order: Cichliformes
- Family: Cichlidae
- Tribe: Haplochromini
- Genus: Hemitaeniochromis; Eccles & Trewavas, 1989

Type species
- Haplochromis urotaenia Regan, 1922

= Hemitaeniochromis =

Genus of fishes

Hemitaeniochromis is a small genus of cichlid fishes endemic to Lake Malawi in east Africa. The genus is distinguished from other genera of Lake Malawi Haplochromini by details of its melanic color pattern and by its dentition. The color pattern includes (1) a midlateral horizontal stripe starting at least an eye length behind the operculum, this stripe broken into separate spots at least on its front half, more nearly continuous on its rear half, extending to the end of the caudal peduncle; (2) a second (supralateral) stripe above the midlateral one that is only on the front part of the flanks, and which is also at least partly broken into spots; (3) above this at the base of the dorsal fin are 4 or 5 dorsal midline spots. The dentition of the jaws is also distinctive in fish at least 10 centimetres (4 inches) in length (not counting the caudal fin); the outer teeth are roughly conical with a single cusp and are spaced apart from each other by about the width of the tooth.

== Species ==
There are currently two recognized species in this genus:

- Hemitaeniochromis brachyrhynchus M. K. Oliver, 2012
- Hemitaeniochromis urotaenia (Regan, 1922)

== In the aquarium ==
Hemitaeniochromis urotaenia is the only member of the genus seen in the aquarium trade. Like all cichlids from Lake Malawi these cichlids are best maintained in hard, alkaline water. Because H. urotaenia individuals can grow to at least 20 cm (8 inches) in length, excluding the caudal fin (Oliver 2012: 49), they are best kept in aquariums with volumes greater than 240 litres (63 gallons).
