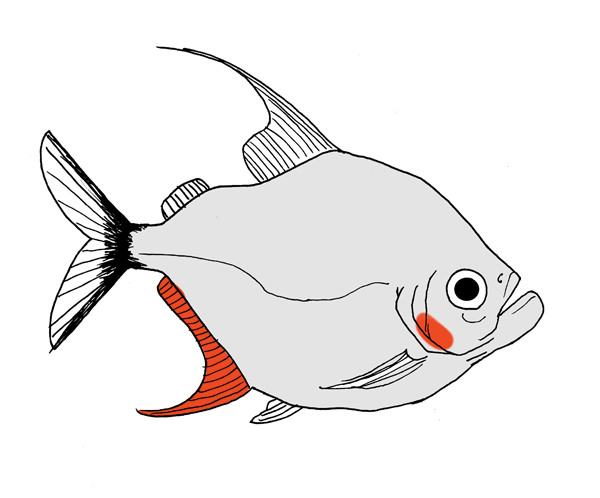

Conservation status
- Least Concern (IUCN 3.1)

Scientific classification
- Kingdom: Animalia
- Phylum: Chordata
- Class: Actinopterygii
- Order: Characiformes
- Family: Serrasalmidae
- Genus: Catoprion
- Species: C. mento

Binomial name
- Catoprion mento (Cuvier, 1819)

Synonyms
- Serrasalmus mento Cuvier, 1819; Mylesinus macropterus Ulrey, 1894

= Wimple piranha =

Species of fish

The wimple piranha (Catoprion mento) is a specialized, South American species of piranha that feeds on fish scales. There is some debate over whether or not this species is considered a true piranha. If considered a true piranha, it would be the smallest species of piranha in the world.

== Taxonomy ==
The wimple piranha is not traditionally considered to be a true piranha; the shape of its teeth and the presence of two rows of teeth (instead of one) on the upper jaw makes it different from the other piranha genera. However, through molecular analysis, this species should be included in the true piranha group if the piranha group is to be monophyletic (see piranha for further discussion).

== Distribution and habitat ==
The wimple piranha is found in the Amazon, Orinoco, Essequibo, and upper Paraguay River basins in South America. This species inhabits clear freshwater streams and lakes with abundant submerged vegetation.

== Description ==
The wimple piranha reaches about 15 cm (6.5 in) in standard length. The curve of its large, banana-shaped lower jaw creates a distinctive protuberance; this gave this fish the specific name mento, which means 'chin'. Its reduced, conical teeth on the upper jaw project forward when the jaws are closed. The wimple piranha has 62 chromosomes, which is more than average for related fishes (60 chromosomes).

== Ecology ==
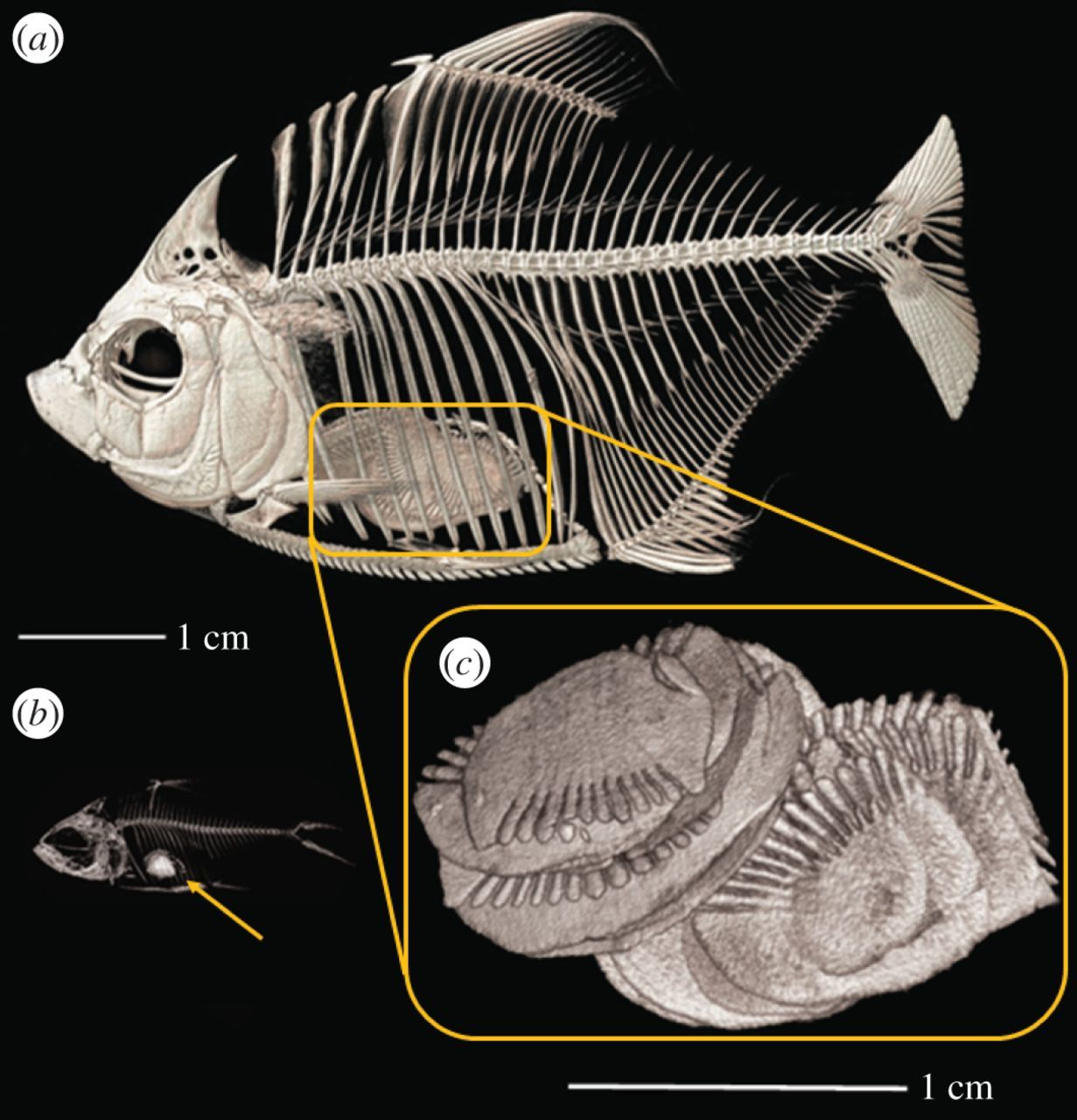
Skeleton, showing large consumed scales in the gut.

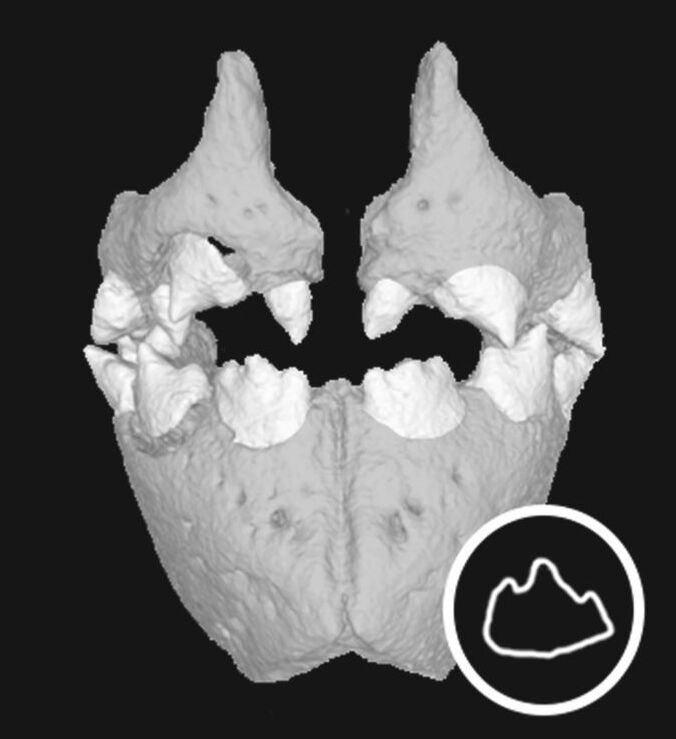
Jaws

This fish possesses powerful dentition and can inflict serious bites.

The dietary breadth of the wimple piranha is one of the narrowest reported for fishes; scales form an important proportion of the diet throughout most of its life, and adults feed almost entirely on them (see lepidophagy). In laboratory conditions, wimple piranhas are known to feed on scales from fish up to three times their own length, and are even known to feed on scales of conspecifics. Like most fish, when the wimple piranha feeds on small fish or scales floating in the water, it uses suction feeding. However, to feed on scales attached to fish, it uses ram feeding, where the predator will charge at the fish; the force of this collision actually knocks scales free. The teeth are used to scrape scales from the body. Scales are ingested both during the strike and after, when loose scales are also eaten. These attacks remove only scales without damaging the underlying musculature.
