= Monostichodus =

Scientific classification
- Kingdom: Animalia
- Phylum: Chordata
- Class: Actinopterygii
- Order: Characiformes
- Family: Distichodontidae
- Genus: Monostichodus; Vaillant, 1886

Type species
- Monostichodus elongatus Vaillant, 1886

Synonyms
- Hemistichodus Pellegrin, 1900

Genus of fishes

Monostichodus is a genus of fish in the family Distichodontidae found in tropical Africa.

== Species ==
There are currently 3 recognized species in this genus:

- Monostichodus elongatus Vaillant, 1886
- Monostichodus lootensi (Poll & Daget, 1968)
- Monostichodus mesmaekersi (Poll, 1959)
