= Magosternarchus =

Scientific classification
- Kingdom: Animalia
- Phylum: Chordata
- Class: Actinopterygii
- Order: Gymnotiformes
- Family: Apteronotidae
- Genus: Magosternarchus; Lundberg, Cox Fernandes & Albert, 1996

Type species
- Magosternarchus raptor Lundberg, Cox Fernandes & Albert, 1996
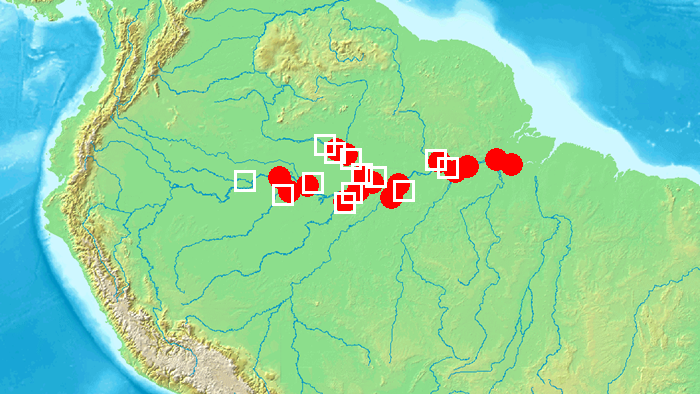
- Occurrences of M. raptor (red circles) and M. duccis (white squares)

Genus of fishes

Magosternarchus is a genus of weakly electric knifefish in the family Apteronotidae, containing two species. They are endemic to Brazil, occurring in large river channels in the Amazon River basin. Both species are unusual benthic predators that specialize in biting off the tails of other knifefishes, and are characterized by their greatly enlarged jaws and teeth. Recent systematic studies indicate that both species should be included in Sternarchella instead of being placed in their own genus.

== Taxonomy and etymology ==
The name Magosternarchus honors Dr. Francisco Mago Leccia, who has made many contributions to the study of gymnotiform knifefishes; the latter part of the name sternarchus is from the Greek sternon ("chest") and archos ("rectum"), referring to the forward placement of the urogenital opening in this group of fishes. The species name of M. raptor is from the Latin for "plunderer", referring to its tail-eating habits; the species name of M. duccis refers to the Duke University Center for Creative Ichthyology (DUCCIS), an ichthyology club. Based on several shared skeletal traits, the closest relative of Magnosternarchus is believed to be the genus Sternarchella. Several studies using both morphological and genetic data, published in 2013 and later, have strongly suggested that the genus should be merged into Sternarchella (making Magosternarchus a junior synonym) and this has been followed by the Catalog of Fishes. Nevertheless, FishBase continues to recognize the two genera as separate.

== Distribution and habitat ==
Both species of Magnosternarchus are believed to range widely in the Amazon basin, including in the Rio Negro to at least above the confluence of the Branco River. M. raptor has been collected as far upstream as the lower Jutai River and as far downstream to the lower Xingu River; M. duccis has been collected as far upstream as Ica River and as far downstream as Trombetas River. They are found in large, swift-flowing whitewater and blackwater river channels, at least 10 m (33 ft) from shore, at depths of 1–23 m (3.3–75.5 ft). They are absent from beaches, small streams, and other marginal habitats.

== Description ==
Magosternarchus species are immediately recognizable by their large jaws, allowing for a wide gape, and their numerous, large, conical teeth. Both the premaxilla and the dentary bone are elongated, the former bearing two to three rows of teeth (numbering 9–14 in the outermost row) and the latter bearing three rows of teeth (numbering 15–19 in the outermost row). The deeply concave dorsal margin of the opercle also serves to distinguish this genus. The eyes are small and placed towards the top of the head. The body is similar to other ghost knifefishes, being laterally compressed with a long anal fin, a small caudal fin, and no dorsal or pelvic fins. There is a dorsal filament originating posterior to the midpoint of the body.

The coloration is pinkish-white to translucent, with varying numbers of grayish-brown to black chromatophores on the upper sides of the body. The chromatophores are most concentrated at the dorsal midline, with the dorsal filament usually the darkest, and there are also thin, vertical lines of chromatophores on the connective tissue between the anal fin radial muscles. The pigmentation on the nape is interrupted by a pair of pale, comma-shaped lateralis tubes. Tiny light dots of electrosensory cell clusters are present over the back. The anal fin is clear, the caudal fin is clear to dusky, and the anal fin is clear in front and darkly pigmented along the base in the back.

== Biology and ecology ==
The only identifiable stomach contents of Magnosternarchus specimens have been the tails of other gymnotiform knifefishes. Most of the Magnosternarchus specimens thus far examined have also possessed regenerated tails. Like other apteronid knifefishes, Magnosternarchus is capable of producing a continuous weak electrical discharge for electrolocation and electrocommunication.

== Species ==
FishBase recognizes two species in this genus, while both are placed in Sternarchella by Catalog of Fishes.

- Magnosternarchus duccis Lundberg, Cox Fernandes & Albert, 1996 This species differs from M. raptor in having a markedly projecting lower jaw that often extends past and over the upper jaw and snout. The head is elongated and deep, with a concave dorsal profile. There are 204–212 fin rays in the anal fin, 14–16 rays in the pectoral fins, and 15 rays in a pointed caudal fin. The maximum reported length is 22.6 cm (8.9 in).

- Magnosternarchus raptor Lundberg, Cox Fernandes & Albert, 1996 This species has an elongated, deep head with a moderately elongated, conical snout. The jaws are of equal length or the upper jaw is slightly longer. There are 180–197 fin rays in the anal fin, 14–16 rays in the pectoral fins, and 17 rays in a rounded caudal fin. The maximum reported length is 19.9 cm (7.8 in).
