= Eugnathichthys =

Scientific classification
- Domain: Eukaryota
- Kingdom: Animalia
- Phylum: Chordata
- Class: Actinopterygii
- Order: Characiformes
- Family: Distichodontidae
- Genus: Eugnathichthys; Boulenger, 1898

Type species
- Eugnathichthys eetveldii Boulenger, 1898

Genus of fishes

Eugnathichthys is a genus of distichodontid fishes found in the Congo Basin in Africa. They are specialized predators that feed on the fins of other fish.

== Species ==
The currently recognized species in this genus are:

- Eugnathichthys eetveldii Boulenger, 1898
- Eugnathichthys macroterolepis Boulenger, 1899
- Eugnathichthys virgatus Stiassny, Denton & Monsembula Iyaba, 2013
