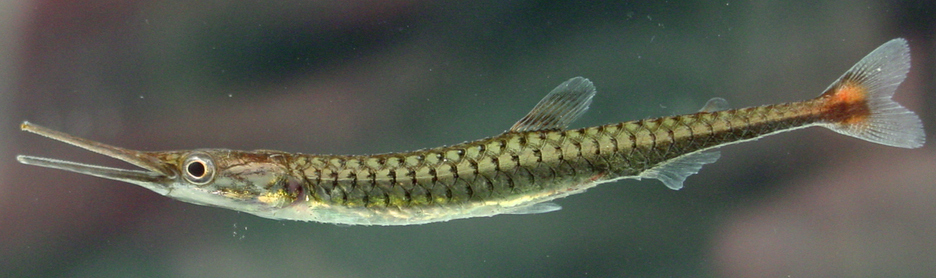
- Belonophago hutsebouti

Scientific classification
- Kingdom: Animalia
- Phylum: Chordata
- Class: Actinopterygii
- Order: Characiformes
- Family: Distichodontidae
- Genus: Belonophago; Giltay, 1929

Type species
- Belonophago hutsebouti Giltay, 1929

= Belonophago =

Genus of fishes

Belonophago is a small genus of freshwater ray-finned fish belonging to the family Distichodontidae. The fishes in this genus are found in the Congo River basin in Africa. They are specialized fin-eaters.

== Species ==
The currently recognized species are:

- Belonophago hutsebouti Giltay, 1929
- Belonophago tinanti Poll, 1939
