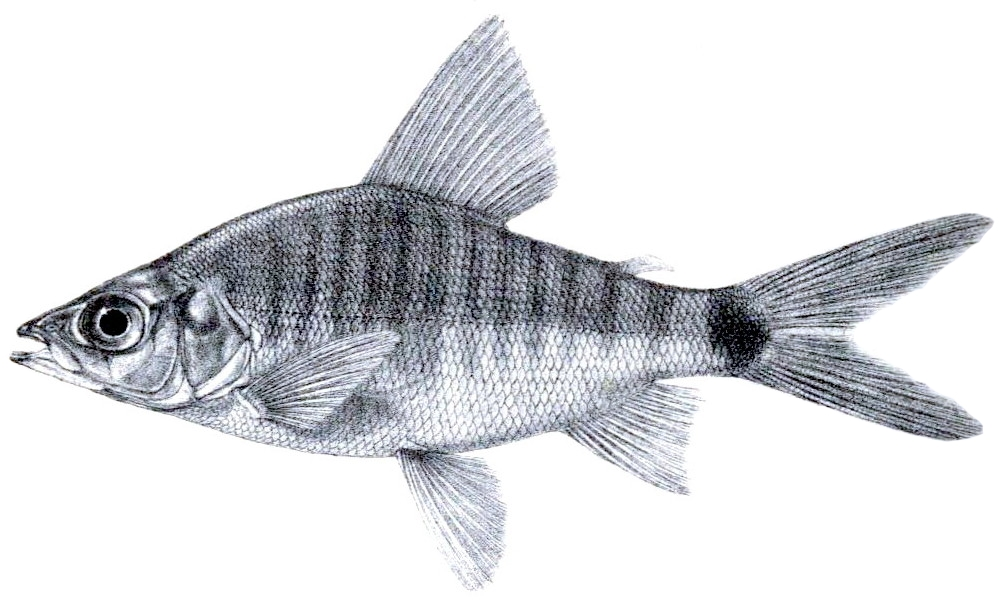
- Xenocharax spilurus

Scientific classification
- Kingdom: Animalia
- Phylum: Chordata
- Class: Actinopterygii
- Order: Characiformes
- Family: Distichodontidae
- Genus: Xenocharax; Günther, 1867

Type species
- Xenocharax spilurus Günther, 1867

= Xenocharax =

Genus of fishes

Xenocharax is a genus of freshwater fish in the family Distichodontidae found in the Congo River Basin in Middle Africa.

== Species ==
There are currently 2 recognized species in this genus:

- Xenocharax crassus Pellegrin, 1900
- Xenocharax spilurus Günther, 1867
