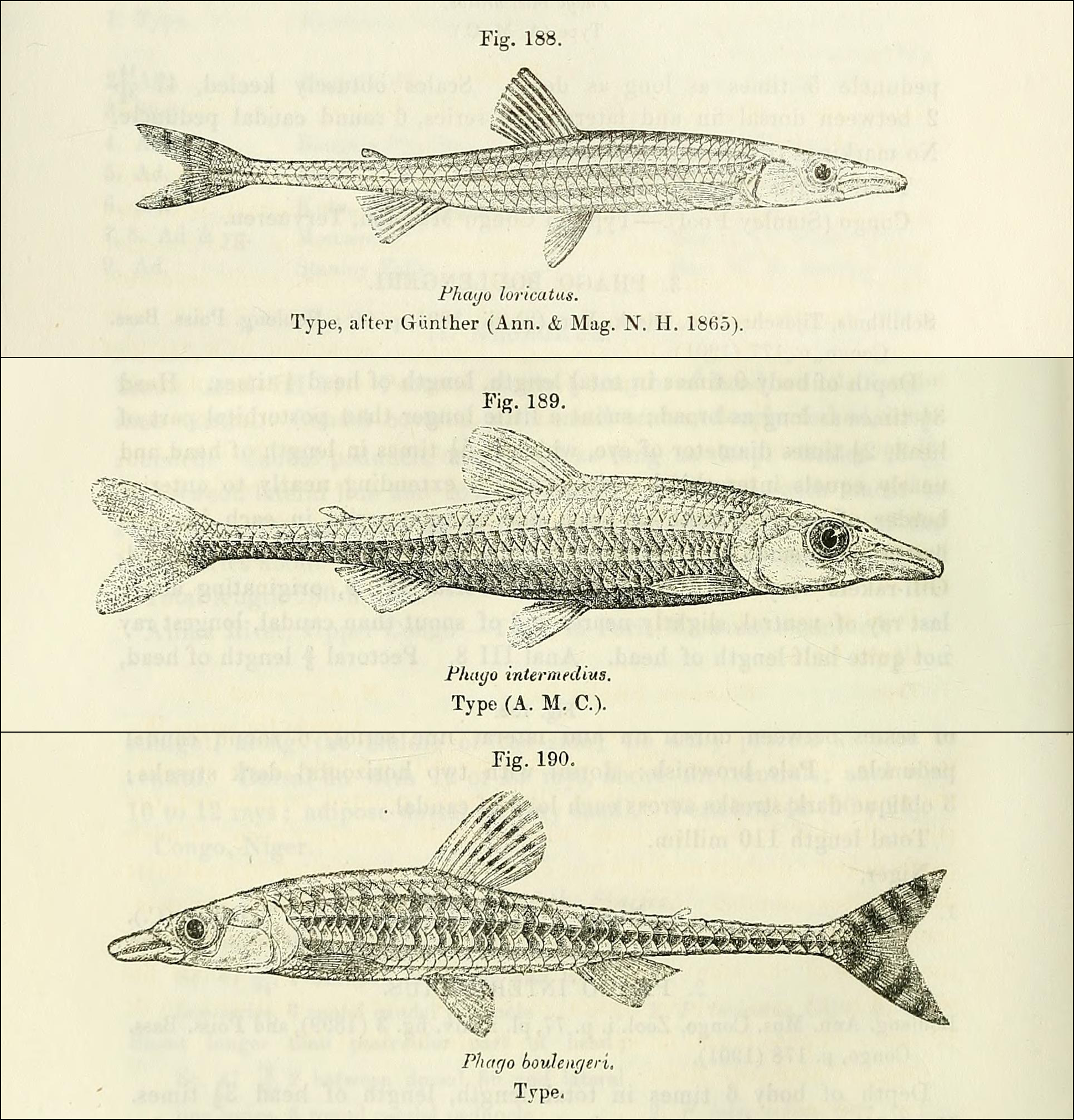
- P. loricatus, P. intermedius, and P. boulengeri.

Scientific classification
- Domain: Eukaryota
- Kingdom: Animalia
- Phylum: Chordata
- Class: Actinopterygii
- Order: Characiformes
- Family: Distichodontidae
- Genus: Phago; Günther, 1865

Type species
- Phago loricatus Günther, 1865

= Phago =

Genus of freshwater fishes

Phago is a genus of distichodontid freshwater fishes in tropical West and Middle Africa. They grow to 17 cm (6.7 in) in total length, are slender in their overall shape and have a beak-like snout. They are specialized fin-eaters which sometimes eat insects and whole fish.

== Species ==
Phago consists of three species:

- Phago boulengeri Schilthuis, 1891
- Phago intermedius Boulenger, 1899
- Phago loricatus Günther, 1865 (African pike-characin)
