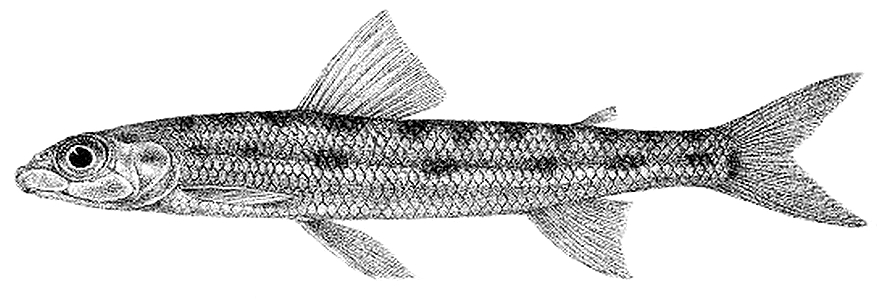
- Nannocharax niloticus

Scientific classification
- Kingdom: Animalia
- Phylum: Chordata
- Class: Actinopterygii
- Division: Teleostei
- Order: Characiformes
- Family: Distichodontidae
- Genus: Nannocharax; Günther, 1867

Type species
- Nannocharax fasciatus Günther, 1867

Synonyms
- Hemigrammocharax Pellegrin, 1923; Microdistichodus Pellegrin, 1926; Thrissocharax Myers, 1926; Hemigrammonannocharax Holly, 1930; Distichodina Fowler, 1935; Lepinannocharax Fowler, 1936

= Nannocharax =

Genus of fishes

Nannocharax is a genus of distichodontid freshwater fishes found in Africa.

== Species ==
Nannocharax contains the following valid species:

- Nannocharax altus Pellegrin, 1930
- Nannocharax angolensis (Poll, 1967)
- Nannocharax ansorgii Boulenger, 1911
- Nannocharax brevis Boulenger, 1902
- Nannocharax chochamandai Manda, Snoeks, Decru, Brecko & Vreven, 2023
- Nannocharax dageti Jerep, Vari & Vreven 2014
- Nannocharax elongatus Boulenger, 1900
- Nannocharax fasciatus Günther, 1867
- Nannocharax fasciolaris Nichols & Boulton, 1927
- Nannocharax gracilis Poll, 1939
- Nannocharax hadros Manda, Snoeks, Manda & Vreven, 2021
- Nannocharax hastatus Jerep & Vari, 2014
- Nannocharax hollyi Fowler, 1936
- Nannocharax intermedius Boulenger, 1903
- Nannocharax latifasciatus Coenen & Teugels, 1989
- Nannocharax lineomaculatus Blache & Miton, 1960
- Nannocharax lineostriatus (Poll, 1967)
- Nannocharax luapulae Boulenger, 1915
- Nannocharax machadoi (Poll, 1967)
- Nannocharax macropterus Pellegrin, 1926
- Nannocharax maculicauda Vari & Géry, 1981
- Nannocharax micros Fowler, 1936
- Nannocharax minutus Worthington, 1933
- Nannocharax monardi (Pellegrin, 1936)
- Nannocharax multifasciatus Boulenger, 1923
- Nannocharax niloticus (Joannis, 1835)
- Nannocharax occidentalis Daget, 1959
- Nannocharax ocellicauda Boulenger, 1907
- Nannocharax ogoensis Pellegrin, 1911
- Nannocharax parvus Pellegrin, 1906
- Nannocharax procatopus Boulenger, 1920
- Nannocharax pteron Fowler, 1936
- Nannocharax reidi Vari & Ferraris, 2004
- Nannocharax rubensteini (Jerep & Vari, 2013)
- Nannocharax rubrolabiatus Van den Bergh, Teugels, Coenen & Ollevier, 1995
- Nannocharax schoutedeni Poll, 1939
- Nannocharax seyboldi Schultz, 1942
- Nannocharax signifer Moritz, 2010
- Nannocharax skeltoni Jerep, Vari, Dillman & de Santana, 2024
- Nannocharax taenia Boulenger, 1902
- Nannocharax uniocellatus (Pellegrin, 1926)
- Nannocharax usongo Dunz & Schliewen, 2009
- Nannocharax wittei (Poll, 1933)
- Nannocharax zebra Dunz & Schliewen, 2009
