= Paedophagy =

Feeding behaviour

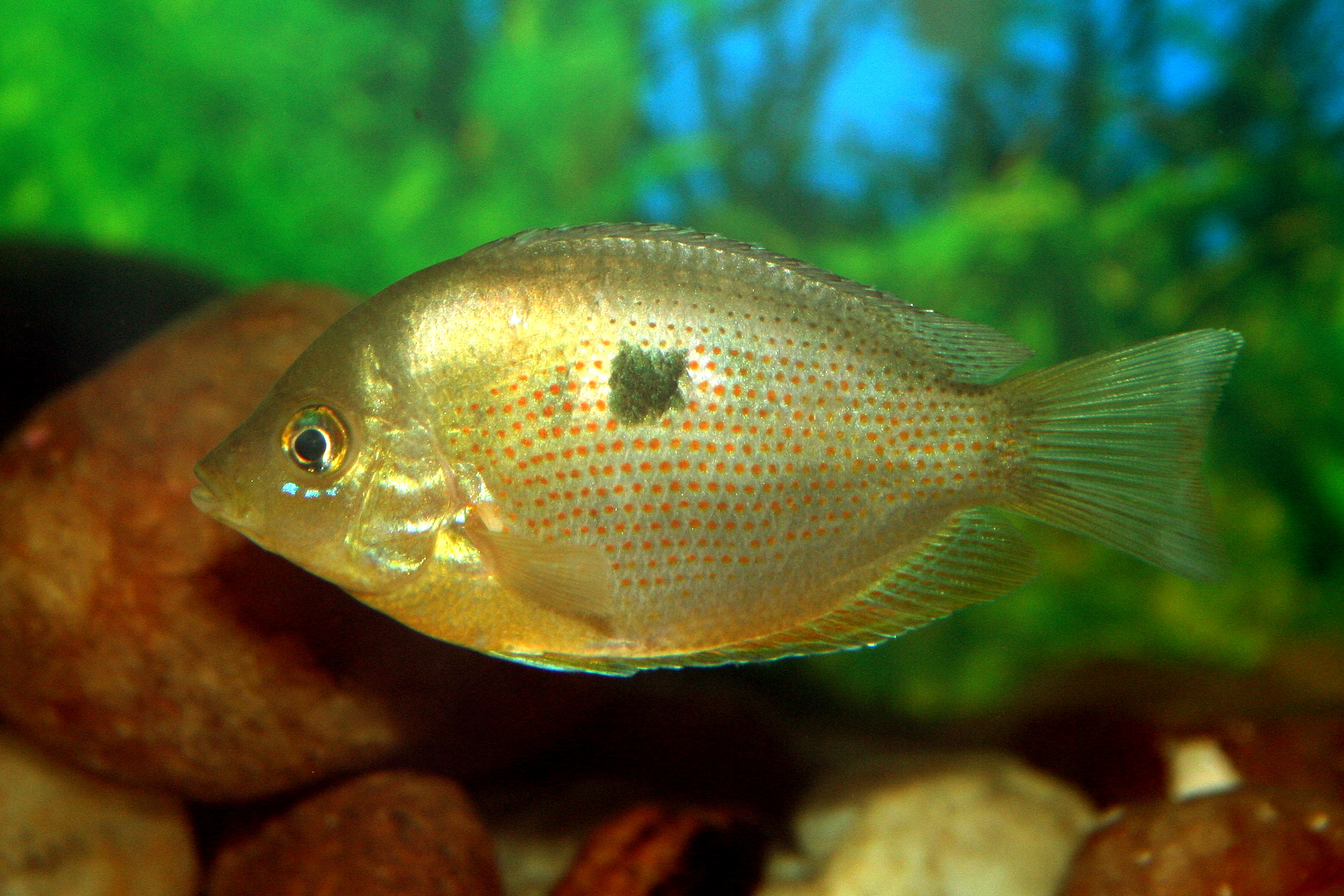
The orange chromide, (Pseudetroplus maculatus) will feed on eggs

Paedophagy (literally meaning the "consumption of children") in its general form is the feeding behaviour of fish or other animals whose diet is partially, or primarily the eggs or larvae of other animals. However, P. H. Greenwood, who was the first to describe paedophagia, defines it to be a feeding behaviour evolved among cichlid fishes.

== Location ==
Paedophagy is found in fishes from Lake Victoria in Africa which in total has 200-300 species, but in regards to paedophages it is known to contain 8 species. Lake Malawi in Africa has in total 500-1000 species, but in paedophages contains only several species. Other lakes which contain paegophages include Lake Edward and Lake George, both in Africa, and each contain only one species of paedophage. From Lake Malawi there are various species of cichlid fish that exhibit paedophagia, they include fishes from the genera Caprichromis, Hemitaeniochromis, and Naevochromis. In Lake Tanganyika species of the genus Haplotaxodon and Greenwoodochromis bellcrossi may also carry out this sort of feeding strategy.

== Mouth brooding ==
Mouth brooding is the most common form of parental care in African cichlids, and is thought to have evolved from the ancestral mode of care known as substrate-guarding. As mouth brooding is so well known in cichlids, one of the main approaches of paedophages is to steal the brood directly from the mouth of a mother. Upon hatching, development occurs in the mouth until juveniles are well-formed fry, the fry then develop further in the mouth until ready in which they are released. Typically followed by a phase of parental guarding. Since the young are kept inside the mothers mouth for an extensive amount of their juvenile life it creates a great opportunity for paedophages, as there is a high probability of a female cichlid to possess young in her mouth.

== Behaviour ==
There are three main methods or behaviours that the predators use to obtain the eggs or young. The first method is voluntary jettisoning of a brood, second being snout-engulfing which forces a brooding female to dislodge her brood from her mouth and lastly, is head-ramming against a brooding female which then causes her to spit out a part of her brood. Other behaviours include those of the species Plecodus straeleni, which belongs to the family Cichlidae. When this species exhibits paedophagy, it has been observed circling and waiting outside the bower, which is the spawning location for many cichlid fishes. It waits until the eggs have been laid before attacking the mouth brooder. However, stealing from the mouth brooding phase is not the only tactic that has been noted, stealing of the fry from the guarding phase of parental care has also been observed.

=== Stealing from guarding phase ===
This involves juveniles who are being guarded by their parent are approached by a paedophage hunter. The parent will do its best to chase away the predator to protect the offspring, on the other hand, this abrupt movement from the parent distresses the offspring. The offspring then all aggregate together until their mother successfully comes back, where she continues with guarding behaviour. There are some cases where the fry may try to enter the mother's mouth once she reappeared, but these fry would only be rejected as the threat was over. The only exception to the fry re-entering their mother's mouth is if the mother has been disturbed by the attack and feels it is unsafe, at which point she could carry out a calling movement and all the fry would enter her mouth for a short period of time before being released.

== Morphology ==
To obtain the brood without causing serious harm to the mouth brooder, paedophages have features such as protrusible and distensible spacious mouths and deeply embedded teeth that are covered by a thickened oral mucosa. These large mouths allow the paedophages to engulf the snout of a mouth brooder and discharge the brood, while the teeth adaptation allows for the paedophage to avoid becoming too heavily attached to the parent which prevents the loss of the brood that the paedophage just obtained.

== Trade-offs ==
Achieving the brood from a brooding parent can take great energy and resources from the paedophage. However, the eggs they obtain are highly nutritious and fairly large when compared to the size of other fish eggs in that they are on average 3.4mm in diameter.

== See also ==
- A Modest Proposal
