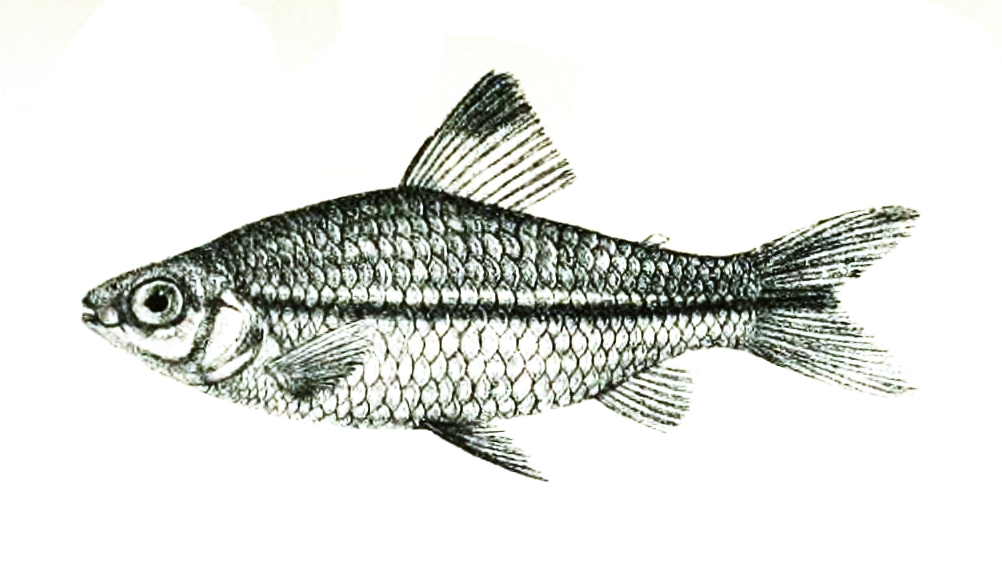
- Nannaethiops unitaeniatus

Scientific classification
- Domain: Eukaryota
- Kingdom: Animalia
- Phylum: Chordata
- Class: Actinopterygii
- Order: Characiformes
- Family: Distichodontidae
- Genus: Nannaethiops; Günther, 1872

Type species
- Nannaethiops unitaeniatus Günther, 1872

= Nannaethiops =

Genus of fishes

Nannaethiops is a genus of distichodontid freshwater fishes found in Africa.

== Distribution ==
Found in Cameroon, Nigeria, Gabon, Republic of the Congo and Democratic Republic of Congo. It's been observed in several river systems including the Congo, Niger and Cross.

== Species ==
There are two recognized species:

- Nannaethiops bleheri Géry & Zarske, 2003
- Nannaethiops unitaeniatus Günther, 1872 (one-line tetra)
