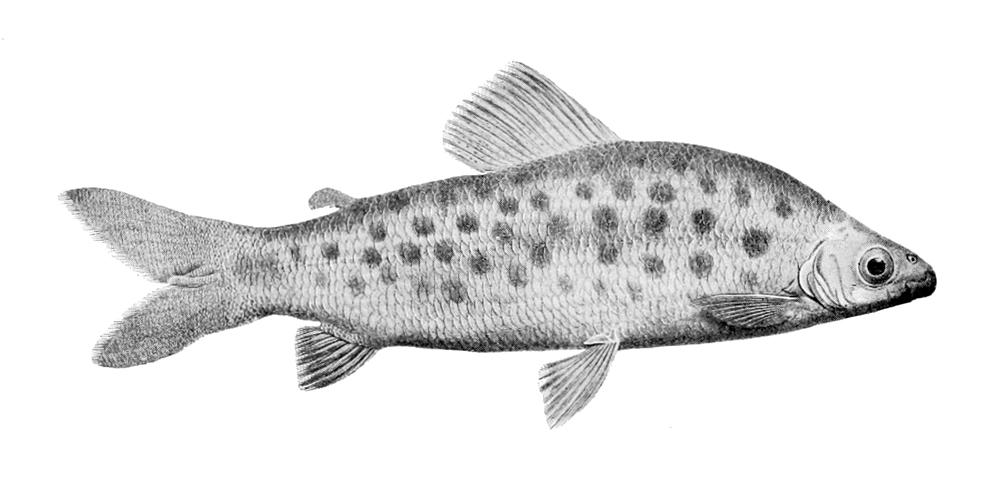
- Distichodus maculatus

Scientific classification
- Kingdom: Animalia
- Phylum: Chordata
- Class: Actinopterygii
- Division: Teleostei
- Order: Characiformes
- Suborder: Citharinoidei
- Family: Distichodontidae; Günther, 1864

Genera
- see text

= Distichodontidae =

Family of fishes

The Distichodontidae are a family of African freshwater fishes of the order Characiformes.

Two evolutionary grades are found in this family; micropredators (predators of very small organisms like aquatic insect larvae) and herbivores have a nonprotractile upper jaw and a deep to shallow body, while carnivores have a movable upper jaw and an elongated body. Although the herbivores primarily feed on plant material, these species often have omnivorous tendencies. The carnivores include specialized fish-eaters (genus Mesoborus), fin-eaters (Belonophago, Eugnathichthys and Phago) and species that will feed on both whole fish and fins (Ichthyborus). The fin-eaters attack other fish, even ones that are much larger, where they bite off pieces of fins with their sharp teeth.

The fish in Distichodontidae vary greatly in size among species, with the smallest micropredators being less than 8 cm (3.1 in) in length, and the largest herbivores can reach up to 83 cm (33 in).

== Genera ==
Distichodontidae contains the following genera:

- Belonophago Giltay, 1929
- Congocharax Matthes, 1964
- Distichodus J. P. Müller & Troschel, 1844
- Dundocharax Poll, 1967
- Eugnathichthys Boulenger, 1898
- Ichthyborus Günther, 1864
- Mesoborus Pellegrin, 1900
- Microstomatichthyoborus Nichols & Griscom, 1917
- Monostichodus Vaillant, 1886
- Nannaethiops Günther, 1872
- Nannocharax Günther, 1867
- Neolebias Steindachner, 1894
- Paradistichodus Pellegrin, 1922
- Paraphago Boulenger, 1899
- Phago Günther, 1865
- Xenocharax Günther, 1867

The following cladogram is based on a 2013 genetic study of Citharinoidei:

- Citharinidae
  Citharinus
- Distichodontidae
  - Xenocharax
  - - Neolebias
    - - - - Hemistichodus
          - Ichthyborus
        - - Mesoborus
          - - Eugnathichthys
            - - - Phago
                - Microstomatichthyoborus
              - - Belonophago
                - Phago
      - - - - Nannocharax
            - Hemigrammocharax
          - - Nannocharax
            - - Hemigrammocharax
              - Nannocharax
        - - Paradistichodus
          - Distichodus
