= Lepidophagy =

Fish eating scales of other fish

Lepidophagy is a specialised feeding behaviour in fish that involves eating the scales of other fish. Lepidophagy is widespread, having evolved independently in at least five freshwater families and seven marine families. A related feeding behavior among fish is pterygophagy: feeding on the fins of other fish.

== Species ==
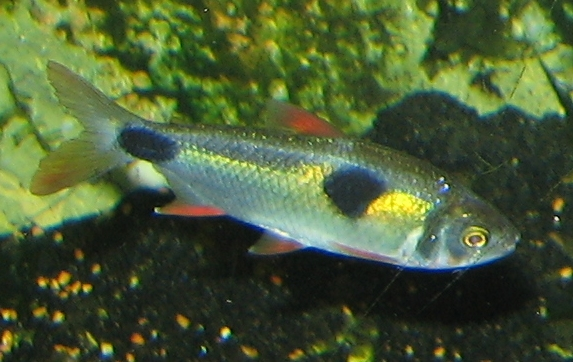
The bucktooth tetra eats scales off other fishes.

Lepidophagy, or scale-eating, has been reported in a range of fish, including Chanda nama (family Ambassidae), Plagiotremus (family Blenniidae), Terapon jarbua (family Terapontidae), a few Ariopsis and Neoarius species (family Ariidae), Pachypterus khavalchor (family contentious - variably in Schilbeidae, Bagridae, or Horabagridae), Macrorhamphoides uradoi (family Triacanthodidae), several pencil catfish (family Trichomycteridae), some piranha, Exodon paradoxus, Probolodus, Roeboides and Roeboexodon species (order Characiformes), Cyprinodon desquamator (family Cyprinodontidae), along with all six Perissodus species, Xenochromis, Haplochromis welcommei, Docimodus, Corematodus and Genyochromis mento (family Cichlidae from the African Great Lakes).

Several of these scale-eaters also feed on fins of other fish, and many omnivorous or predatory fish may on occasion nip the fins of other fish. Only a few species are specialized fin-eaters, or pterygophagous; these include Belonophago, Eugnathichthys and Phago (family Distichodontidae), Aspidontus (family Blenniidae), and Smilosicyopus (family Gobiidae). A somewhat related behavior is found in Magosternarchus, which feed on the tails (both fin and connective tissue) of other gymnotiform knifefish.

== Physiology ==
Many species of cichlid fish have evolved specialized teeth and mouth structures that make them better able to feed on the scales of other fish. Other species of fish also have a morphology that is better adapted to scale-eating. Many such species' oral structures closely resemble each other even though they live in different habitats, and many also have specialized jaw structures. One species of fish in particular, called Roeboides prognathous, has a jaw structure that is extremely specialized for lepidophagy. Certain species of lepidophagous catfish, Pachypterus khavalchor, have digestive enzymes which help them to more readily break down the fins, eyes, scales of other fish. There are other morphological structures that are important in scale-eating habitats. There are six lepidophagous cichlid species who employ mimicry strategies to deceive their prey: the colors of the cichlid fish closely resemble the colors of some of their prey. However, they not only eat the scales of the fish they resemble, but also prey on a wide range of other species.

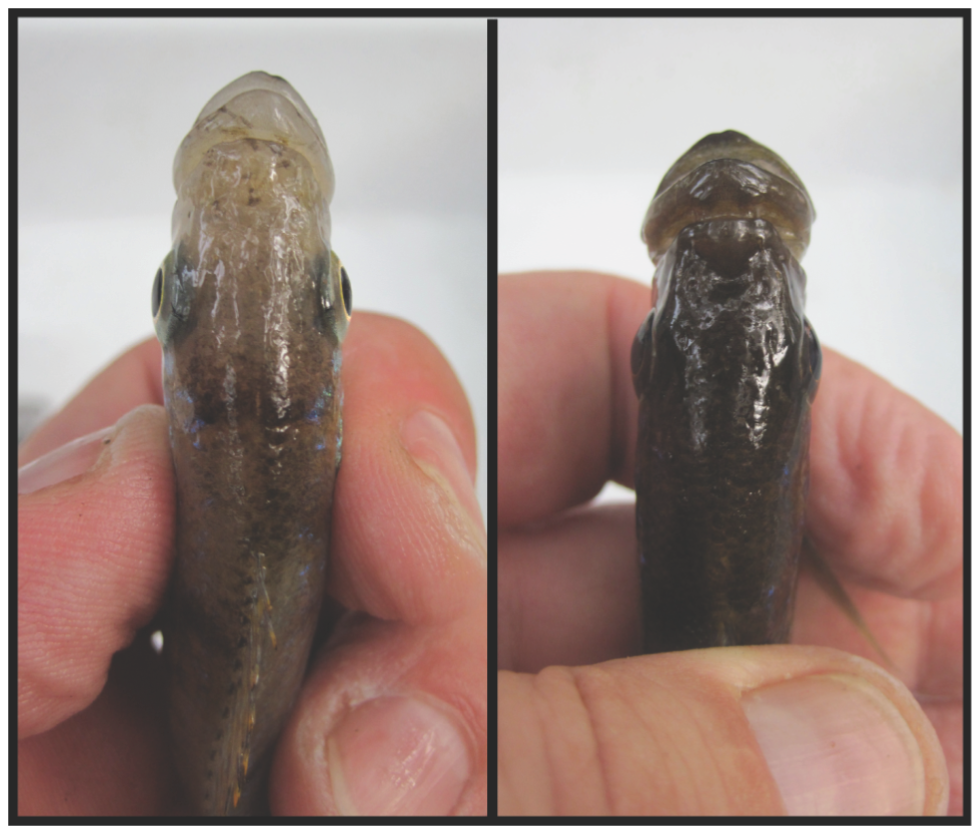
Perissodus microlepis right and left-bending jaw morphs

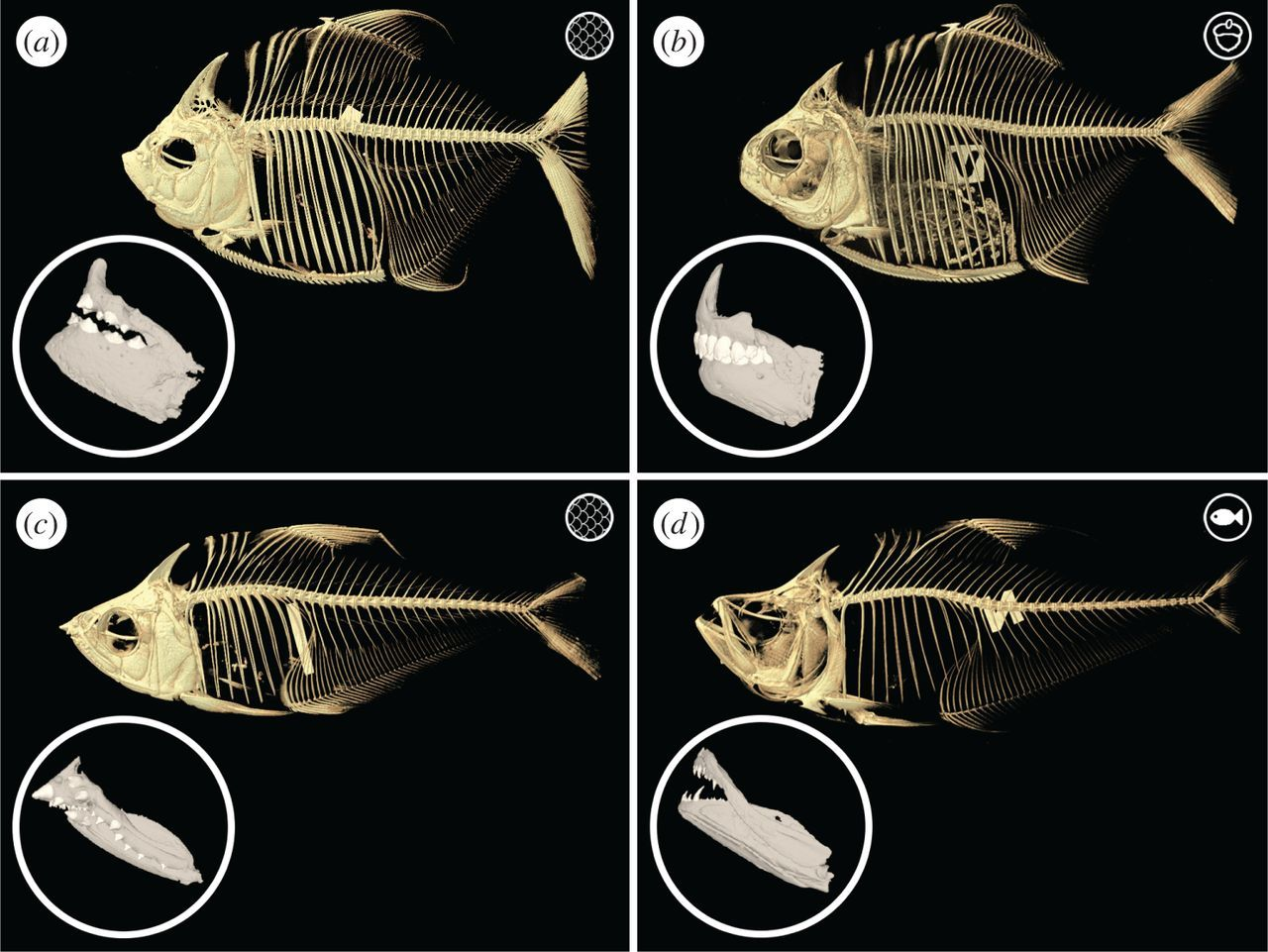
Lepidophagous fish (A and C) with non-lepidophagous relatives (B and D): Catoprion mento (A), Pygopristis denticulata (B), Roeboides affinis (C), Charax cf. pauciradiatus (D)

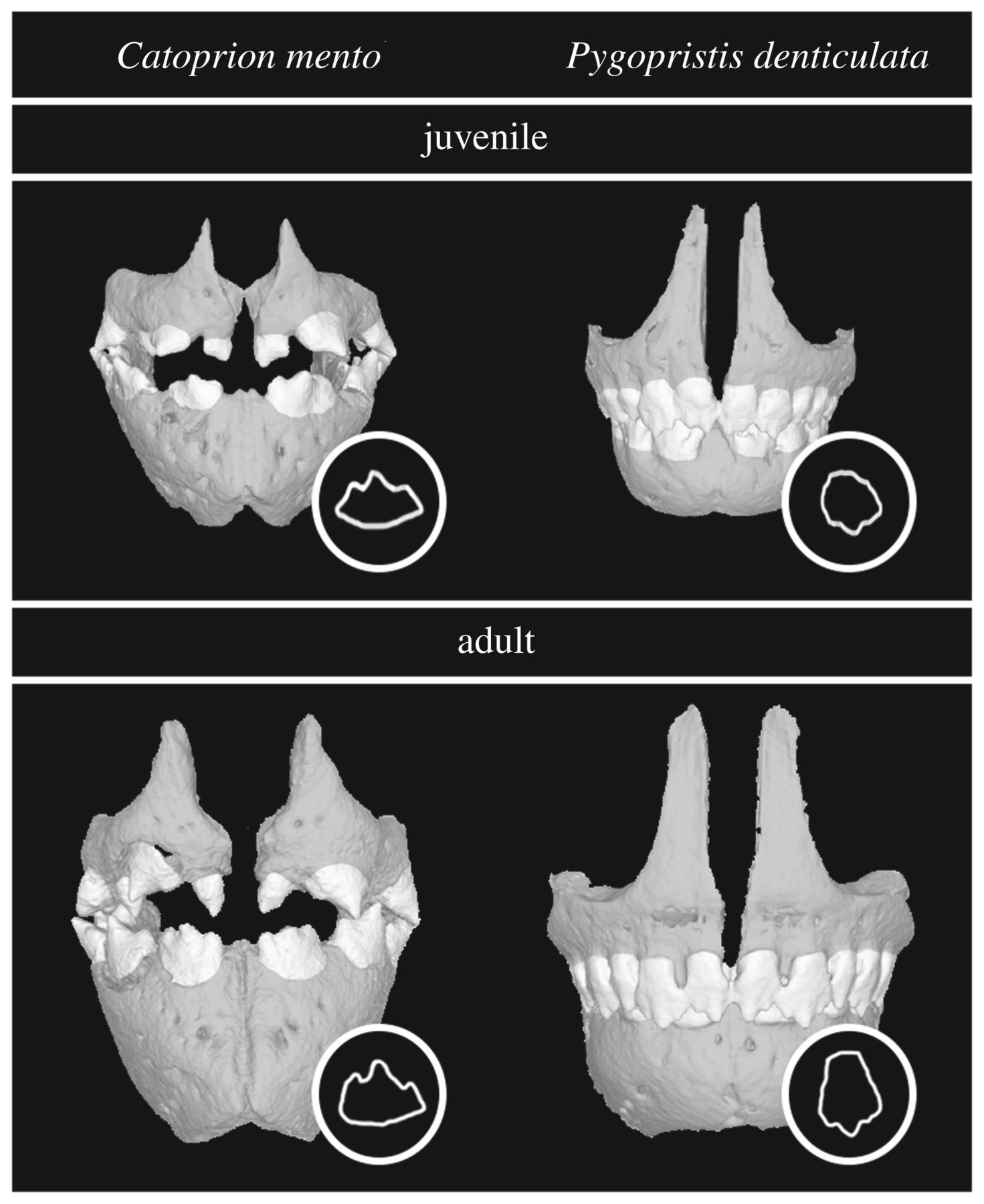
Jaws of serrasalmids: Catoprion mento (which feed on large scales throughout its life) and Pygopristis denticulata (which feed only on small scales as juveniles)

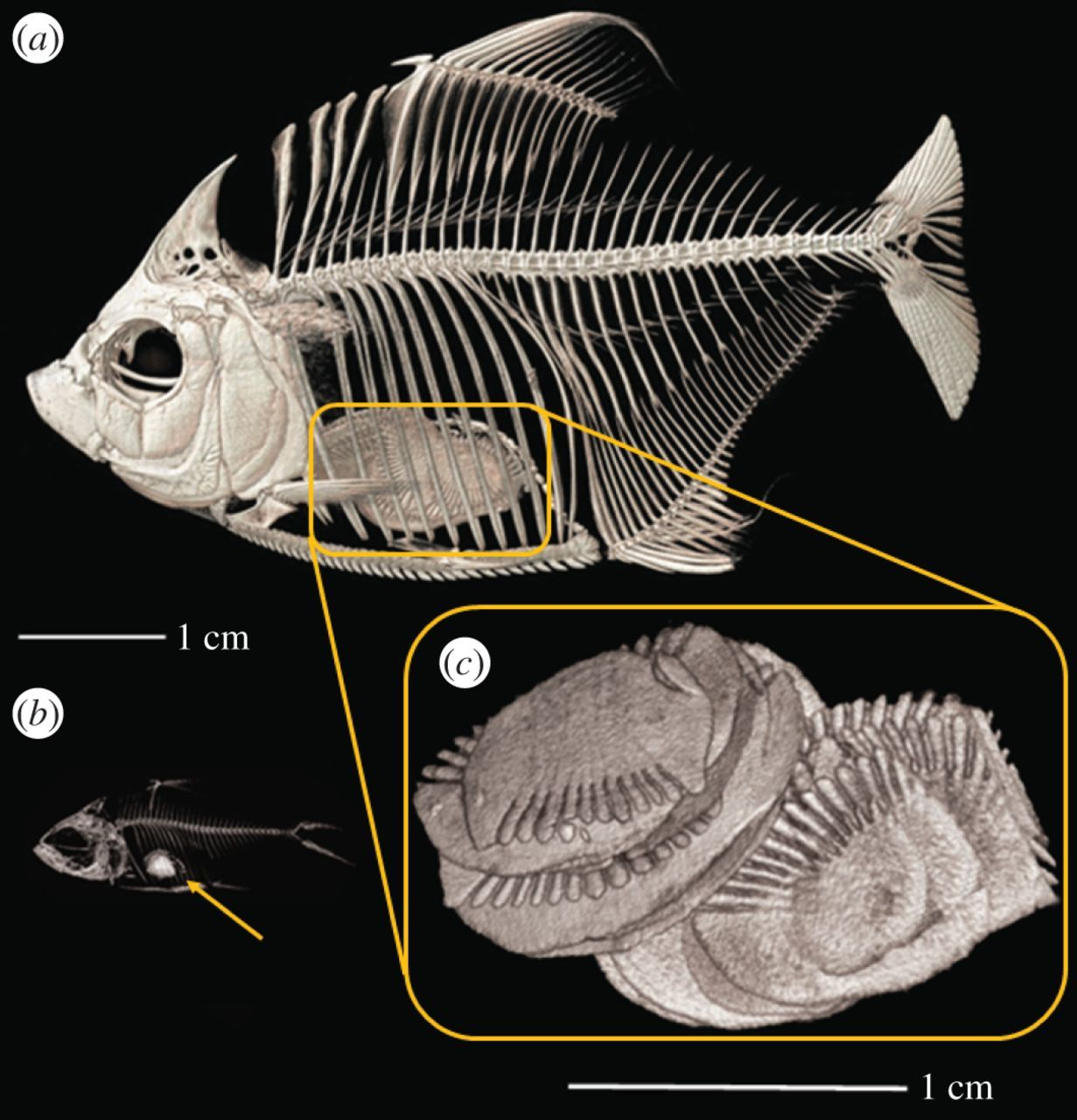
Wimple piranha skeleton, showing large consumed scales stacked within its gut

== Behaviour ==
Perissodus microlepis attacking a goldfish

There are many different behaviours associated within lepidophagous fish. Aggression and attack behaviours like chasing and striking prey are common among Pachypterus khavalchor catfish, who then eat the fallen scales of their prey. The attack behaviour of the wimple piranha Catoprion mento, whose diet consists mainly of scales, is described as a "high-speed" attack. They ram into their prey with their mouth open, biting the prey to obtain their scales. Perissodus microlepis cichlid fish tear off the scales of their prey as they swim past. This is very different from other lepidophagous species, who merely knock the scales loose by striking the prey.

There are differences and similarities in lepidophagous behaviours across species. For example, the siluroid catfish's attacking behaviour is similar to that of the Probolodus heterostomus: they both follow their prey and attack their prey from behind. This is different from the behaviour of Roeboides prognatus and Exodon paradoxus, who remove scales more easily by attacking a specific part of their prey's body called the caudal area. Many studies have examined the hunting behaviours of scale-eating fish and how those behaviours have evolved over time. Certain species of cichlid aggressively mimic the behaviours of their prey, a tactic rarely used by other scale-eating fish species.

== Niche ==
The differences in the niche of certain species may play a role in their behaviours. Lepidophagous behaviours only exist in some species. Adaptive radiation has been mentioned in many articles as having a role in the evolution of lepidophagy. There is some evidence to support this but much is also unclear. Some behaviours in certain species of fish support the theory that extreme environments could be potential causes of scale eating behaviours. Some of those species are named below.

=== Cyprinodon pupfish ===
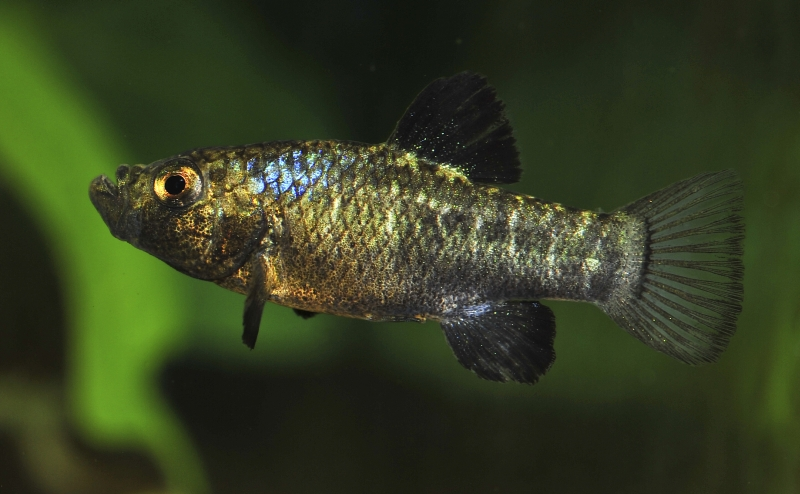
Cyprinodon desquamator

In the case of Cyprinodon pupfish, almost all have a diet of algae and detritus, but the species Cyprinodon desquamator (only scientifically described in 2013; previously known as Cyprinodon sp. "lepidophage" or Cyprinodon sp. "scale-eater") is different. There are only two known cases where several Cyprinodon species live together: lakes in San Salvador Island, the Bahamas, and Lake Chichancanab, Mexico. In both cases, the co-occurring Cyprinodon species have diverged into feeding on different things and in lakes on San Salvador Island; this includes the scale-eating C. desquamator (there are no scale-eaters in Lake Chichancanab, although C. maya has become a fish-eater).

=== Cichlids ===
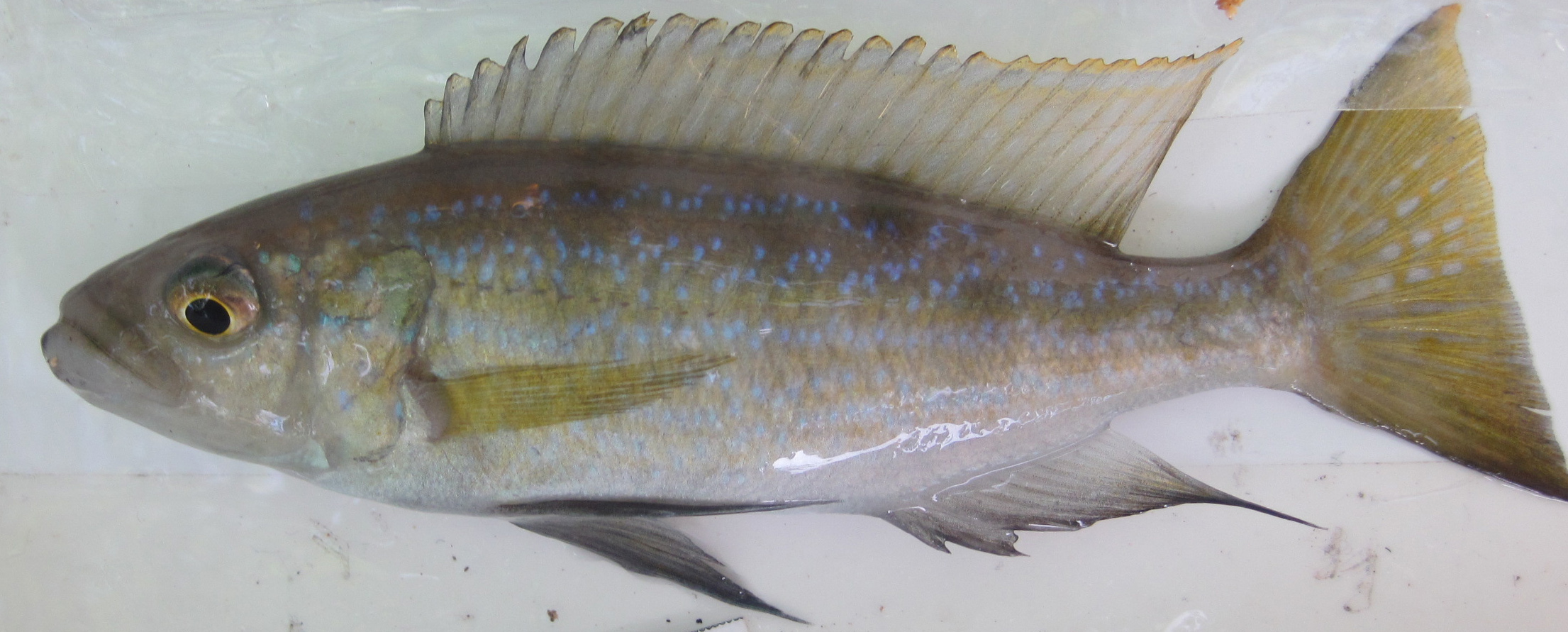
Perissodus microlepis, a lepidophagous cichlid

There is a diverse range of cichilds in Lake Tanganyika in East Africa but the Tanganyikan cichlid tribes, Perissodini and Plecodus, feed on the scales of cichlids and other fishes. The species of cichilds that exhibit scale eating behaviours live in deep water with very low levels of oxygen and have had to rapidly evolve to keep up with a changing environment and lack of food.

== Trade-offs ==
Fish scales are a nutritional food source, containing layers of keratin and enamel, as well as a dermal portion and a layer of protein-rich mucus. They are a rich source of calcium phosphate. However, the energy expended to make a strike versus the amount of scales consumed per strike puts a limit on the size of the lepidophage; such fish seldom exceed 20 cm (8 in) and most are under 12 cm (5 in). Because of this lepidophagous fish usually are much smaller than their prey. Though scales are nutritious, the average amount of scales dislodged and eaten may not be sufficient to make up for the energy lost during the attack. The attack behaviours and strikes that are employed to remove and eat scales have an energy cost and risk of harm to the predator. In light of this, there are also a number of advantages to consuming scales: scales are common, covering the body of most fish species, can be regrown relatively quickly by "prey" fish, are abundant and seasonally reliable, and their removal requires specific behaviours or morphological structures. Scale eating behaviour usually evolves because of lack of food and extreme environmental conditions. The eating of scales and the skin surrounding the scales provides protein-rich nutrients that may not be available elsewhere in the niche.

== Bibliography ==
- Boileau, N.; Cortesi, F.; Egger, B.; Muschick, M.; Indermaur, A.; Theis, A.; Büscher, H.; Salzburger, W. (2015). "A complex mode of aggressive mimicry in a scale-eating cichlid fish". Biology Letters. 11 (9): 9. doi:10.1098/rsbl.2015.0521. PMC 4614428. PMID 26399975.
- Janovetz, J (2005). "Functional morphology of feeding in the scale-eating specialist Catoprion mento". Journal of Experimental Biology. 208 (24): 4757–4768. doi:10.1242/jeb.01938. PMID 16326957.
- Martin, C.; Wainwright, P. (2013). "On the measurement of ecological novelty: Scale-eating Pupfish are separated by 168 my from other scale-eating fishes". PLOS ONE. 8 (8): 8. Bibcode:2013PLoSO...871164M. doi:10.1371/journal.pone.0071164. PMC 3747246. PMID 23976994.
- Koblmuller; Egger, B.; Sturmbauer, C.; Sefc, K. (2007). "Evolutionary history of Lake Tanganyika's scale-eating cichlid fishes". Molecular Phylogenetics and Evolution. 44 (3): 1295–1305. doi:10.1016/j.ympev.2007.02.010. PMID 17383901.
- Martin, Christopher H.; Wainwright, Peter C. (2011). "Trophic novelty is linked to exceptional rates of morphological diversification in two adaptive radiations of Cyprinodon Pupfish". Evolution. 65 (8): 2197–2212. doi:10.1111/j.1558-5646.2011.01294.x. PMID 21790569.
- Sachin, M.; Gosavi, Sanjay; Kharat, Kumkar; Sushant, S.; Navarange (2017). "Interplay between behavior, morphology and physiology supports lepidophagy in the catfish Pachypterus khavalchor (Siluriformes: Horabagridae)". Zoology. 126: 185–191. doi:10.1016/j.zool.2017.07.003. PMID 29191622.
