= Humboldtichthys =

Scientific classification
- Kingdom: Animalia
- Phylum: Chordata
- Class: Actinopterygii
- Division: Teleostei
- Order: Gymnotiformes
- Family: Sternopygidae
- Subfamily: Sternopyginae
- Genus: †Humboldtichthys; Gayet & Meunier, 2000
- Species: †H. kirschbaumi

Binomial name
- †Humboldtichthys kirschbaumi (Gayet & Meunier, 1991)

Synonyms
- Ellisella kirschbaumi Gayet & Meunier, 1991

Extinct genus of fishes

Humboldtichthys is an extinct genus of glass knifefishes from the Miocene Yecua Formation of Bolivia. A single species is currently recognized: Humboldtichthys kirschbaumi.

== History and naming ==
The earliest remains of gymnotiform electric fish were discovered in the Bolivian Yecua Formation 95 km (59 mi) west-northwest of Santa Cruz by petroleum geologists and easily recognized to belong to a gymnotiform fish based on several characteristic anatomical features. From material collected, Gayet & Meunier described Ellisella kirschbaumi in 1991, unaware that the genus name was already occupied by a genus of soft coral (Ellisella). The holotype specimen, RL 1596-4, represents an incomplete fragment of the animal, preserving the posterior (rear) margin of the skull and anterior (front) elements of the body. An additional six fossils were also referred to the genus by Gayet & Meunier. The generic name was eventually realized to be preoccupied, and the animal was given a new genus in 2000, being Humboldtichthys, and the referred specimens were re-examined by Albert & Fink (2007). In their examination they compared the holotype specimen with all 6 referred specimen and 3 further gymnotiform fossils from the Yecua Formation, and they concluded that the collected material represents more than one species, with most specimens potentially representing members of extant genera.

Humboldtichthys translates to "Humboldt's fish". Originally the name Ellisella kirschbaumi was meant to honor both American physiologist Max Mapes Ellis and German ichthyologist Frank Kirschbaum, who pioneered the research of gymnotiform growth and regeneration.

== Description ==
The holotype specimen preserves the right side of Humboldtichthys with a 5.5 cm (2.2 in) long axis, including impressions of the opercle and preopercle as well as the anterior portion of the body. The surface of opercle and preopercle are lamellar with multiple deep radial striations. Although such striations are also present in modern members of Sternopygus, they are noticeably more pronounced in Humboldtichthys and was the only diagnostic feature not called into question by Albert & Fink (2007). The anterior limb of the preopercle is broad and crescent shaped, while its dorsal limb preserves a portion of a relatively broad preopercular-mandibular laterosensory canal. The entire preopercle is oriented oblique to the main axis of the head. The opercle is triangular in shape with its dorsal, posterior and ventral margins slightly convex. However poor preservation renders it difficult to determine the exact shape of these bones. The origin of the anal fin is located immediately behind the posterior margin of the operculum and the holotype specimen preserves 28 pterygiophores and 15 fin rays, all of which unbranched. The pectoral fin possesses a minimum of 10 fin rays with a posterior displacement of approximately 1–2 cm. Compared to the depth of the body the ribs are relatively short.

== Phylogeny ==
In 1994 Gayet et al. hypothesized that Humboldtichthys represented a basal gymnotiform and sister taxon to all other gymnotiforms other than the family Apteronotidae.

In their 2007 study, Albert & Fink score each knifefish specimen from the Yecua Formation individually due to the lack of overlapping diagnostic material and the fact that knifefish are known to occur alongside other knifefish genera (sympatry), meaning that sharing a single locality may not be reason enough to assign them to a single specimen. They recovered one referred specimen as Gymnotiformes incertae sedis and 4 more specimens as members of Sinusoidea. The holotype specimen of Humboldtichthys was recovered as a sister taxon to the extant Sternopygus. One specimen is placed within Sternopygidae incertae sedis while the remaining three specimens analysed were all recovered as Sternopygus incertae sedis.

- - Characiformes
  - - Siluriformes
    - - RL 1596-15
      - - Gymnotus
        - Electrophorus
      - - - Rhamphichthyidae
          - Hypopomidae
        - - Apteronotidae
          - RL 1596-3
          - RL 1596-A
          - RL 1596-C
          - RL 1596-5
          - - RL 1596-1
            - - RL 1596-B
              - RL 1596-13
              - RL 1596-7
              - - Humboldtichthys kirschbaumi
                - Sternopygus
            - - Archolaemus
              - - Distocyclus
                - - Eigenmannia
                  - Rhabdolichops

== Paleobiology ==
Humboldtichthys is known from the Bolivian Yecua Formation, which represents a humid to semi-arid environment close to the coast with a variety of bodies of water. Fossil remains, including stomach content from previously referred specimens, confirms the presence of both small bodied characids and catfish in addition to the knifefish fauna. Grass-like aquatic macrophytes have also been found. Albert & Fink suggest that the specific locality where Humboldtichthys and the other knifefish remains have been found may preserve what was once a slow moving terra firma (non-floodplain) stream, a common habitat for multi-species gymnotiform assemblages.
