= Eigenmannia vicentespelaea =

Conservation status
- Vulnerable (IUCN 3.1)

Scientific classification
- Kingdom: Animalia
- Phylum: Chordata
- Class: Actinopterygii
- Order: Gymnotiformes
- Family: Sternopygidae
- Genus: Eigenmannia
- Species: E. vicentespelaea

Binomial name
- Eigenmannia vicentespelaea Triques, 1996
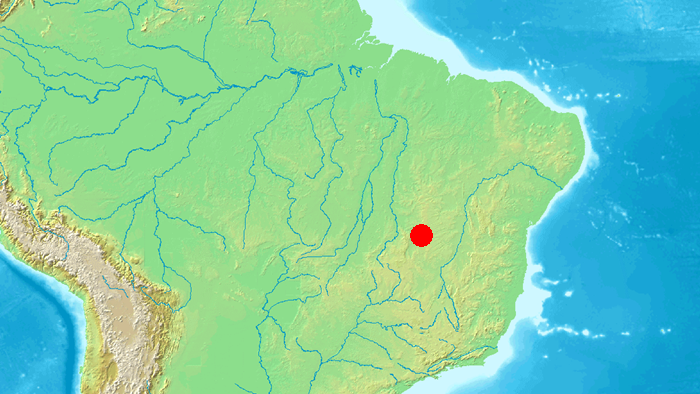
- Occurrences of E. vicentespelaea

Species of fish

Eigenmannia vicentespelaea is a species of weakly electric knifefish in the family Sternopygidae. Native to the São Domingos karst area in central Brazil, it is the only known knifefish to exclusively inhabit caves. Measuring up to 21 cm (8.3 in) long, E. vicentespelaea can be distinguished from its relatives by its translucent body and reduced or absent eyes. As some individuals retain well-developed eyes, this fish may have colonized caves only recently in evolutionary time.

== Taxonomy ==
Brazilian ichthyologist Mauro Luís Triques described E. vicentespelaea in a 1996 volume of the scientific journal Revue Française de Aquariologie, from two specimens caught in 1978. He chose the specific epithet vicentespelaea from the São Vicente I cave, the type locality, and speleum, Latin for "cave". Based on color pattern and morphology, it is included in the E. virescens species group with E. virescens, E. trilineata, and a third undescribed species.

== Distribution and habitat ==
The only known troglobitic (exclusively cave-dwelling) member of the order Gymnotiformes, E. vicentespelaea is found in the São Vicente I and São Vicente II caves near São Domingos, in the central Brazilian state of Goiás. These limestone karst caves are fed by streams connected to the Paranã River, a tributary of the upper Tocantins River in the Amazon Basin.

Four other knifefish, Archolaemus blax, Porotergus species, Sternarchorhynchus mesensis and Sternopygus species, have been recorded in the São Vicente II cave together with E. vicentespelaea, but they are not true troglobites and also inhabit aboveground waters.

== Description ==
Eigenmannia vicentespelaea has an elongated, laterally compressed body with curved dorsal and ventral profiles, tapering to a filament without a caudal fin. The anal fin stretches the length of the body, while the dorsal and pelvic fins are absent. The ratio between the head length and the distance from snout tip to anus is greater than in other Eigenmannia. The snout is short, with a small terminal mouth containing small, slender teeth on both jaws. The posterior pair of nares are positioned close to the eyes, which are reduced in size or, in a minority of individuals, externally absent. The gill openings are small. The body is entirely covered by tiny cycloid scales. Living fish are translucent, more so than other Eigenmannia, with 2–3 horizontal stripes. Among the larger members of its genus, E. vicentespelaea reaches 20.8 cm (8.2 in) in total length.

== Biology and ecology ==
The variation in the eye size of E. vicentespelaea suggest that this species may have been isolated in caves for a relatively short time. As far as known, all South American knifefishes are capable of generating an electric field for electrolocation; this adaptation for activity in low light conditions would have been conducive to them colonizing completely dark cave environments. The relatively larger size attained by E. vicentespelaea compared to its sister species may indicate a release from predation or competition once it became cave-dwelling.

== Human interactions ==
E. vicentespelaea is threatened by siltation caused by destruction of riparian forests upstream of its cave habitat. The range of this species itself protected by Terra Ronca State Park.
