= Gymnotus tigre =

Conservation status
- Least Concern (IUCN 3.1)

Scientific classification
- Kingdom: Animalia
- Phylum: Chordata
- Class: Actinopterygii
- Order: Gymnotiformes
- Family: Gymnotidae
- Genus: Gymnotus
- Species: G. tigre

Binomial name
- Gymnotus tigre Albert & Crampton, 2003

Species of fish

Gymnotus tigre, the tiger knifefish, is a species of naked-backed South American knifefish in the family Gymnotidae, inhabiting the upper reaches of the Amazon basin.

== Nomenclature ==
Both the tiger knifefish's common and scientific names refer to the tiger-like stripes present on the fish's flanks, with the common name being coined by local aquarium traders.

It is the type species for a clade within Gymnotus dubbed the "Tigre subgenus"; this subgenus is the second-most widespread group of Gymnotus, ranging from Panama to northern Argentina (though G. tigre itself has a more restricted range).

== Description ==
Gymnotus tigre has a number of diagnostic traits; the markings consist of irregular pale yellow blotches and bands on the body, with blotches on the head and in front of the opercle and alternating bands furthermore; the lighter bands may be broader than the darker brown stripes. Lastly, they have oblique stripes and a "hyaline" patch on their tail-end. These markings are distinct from all other Gymnotus other than G. henni, which also has a slightly wider mouth and proportionally shorter head. This species has a similar number of pre-caudal vertebrae as G. esmeraldas, having 46-48 as opposed to the species in the G. carapo group, which have fewer pre-caudal vertebra; these vertebra determine the size of the body cavity, and thus the available volume for the internal organs.

Gymnotus tigre's eyes are located slightly below the "line" of its superior mouth, which has a limited gape. The scales are elongated in the antero-posterior axis (back-to-front); their elongation is proportional to body size and the exact ratio of elongation depends on their position on the body, with midbody scales being most elongated at around 3-5 times longer than tall. The circumorbitals are egg-shaped. The ventral lateral line has straight rami (branches). The very long anal fin, characteristic of all knifefish, has 190 to 240 soft rays. The caudal appendage (tail) is less than half the length of the pectoral fins.

The electric organ is located hypaxially, being below the center axis of the body.

The holotype tiger knifefish, catalog number UF 25552, is 41.1 centimetres (16.2 in) long, with the other specimens studied being smaller. A later specimen was measured to be 53.3 centimetres (21.0 in) TL.

== Distribution ==
The holotype was collected from the north bank of Rio Amazonas, near the town of Leticia; subsequent samplings have extended its range to waterways stretching from Ecuador and Peru (Napo-Pastaza, Putumayo) to Brazil (Tapajós); this distribution is described as "Cis-Andean".

== Biology ==
The holotype was collected among floating macrophytes (aquatic plants). The subgenus "Tigre" are typically large-bodied predators that hunt on floodplains. Like other Gymnotids (such as the electric eels), this fish is a facultative air-breather, though it isn't truly amphibious.
