= Gymnotus tiquie =

Conservation status
- Least Concern (IUCN 3.1)

Scientific classification
- Kingdom: Animalia
- Phylum: Chordata
- Class: Actinopterygii
- Division: Teleostei
- Order: Gymnotiformes
- Family: Gymnotidae
- Genus: Gymnotus
- Species: G. tiquie

Binomial name
- Gymnotus tiquie Maxime, F. C. T. Lima & Albert, 2011

Species of fish

Gymnotus tiquie, the sarapó, is an electric knifefish found in the Tiquié River, a tributary of the Vaupés River in the upper Negro basin, Amazonas, Brazil. It is sympatric with both G. carapo and G. coropinae. Like the rest of its genus, it is exclusively a freshwater fish. It generates a weak electric field used for both navigation and communication.

It possesses a distinct color pattern of dark, oblique bands divided into pairs. G. cataniapo is the most similar-looking species, with both fish sharing several characteristics. It grows to a maximum length around 24 cm (9.4 in).
