= Eigenmannia cacuria =

Scientific classification
- Domain: Eukaryota
- Kingdom: Animalia
- Phylum: Chordata
- Class: Actinopterygii
- Order: Gymnotiformes
- Family: Sternopygidae
- Genus: Eigenmannia
- Species: E. cacuria

Binomial name
- Eigenmannia cacuria Dutra, Ramos & Menezes, 2022

Species of fish

Eigenmannia cacuria is a species of glass knifefish in the family Sternopygidae. It is found in the upper Parnaíba River of north-eastern Brazil.

== Etymology ==
The species epithet “cacuria” is in reference to a typical dance in the state of Maranhão, Brazil where the holotype was collected.
