= Archolaemus santosi =

Conservation status
- Vulnerable (IUCN 3.1)

Scientific classification
- Kingdom: Animalia
- Phylum: Chordata
- Class: Actinopterygii
- Order: Gymnotiformes
- Family: Sternopygidae
- Genus: Archolaemus
- Species: A. santosi

Binomial name
- Archolaemus santosi Vari, de Santana & Wosiacki, 2012

Species of fish

Archolaemus santosi is a species of glass knifefish endemic to Brazil where it is found in the Rio Mucajaí and Rio Uraricoera in the north-eastern portions of the Amazon basin. This species reaches a length of 21.2 cm (8.3 in).

== Etymology ==
The knifefish is named in honor of Geraldo Mendes dos Santos of the Instituto Nacional de Pesquisas da Amazônia, who collected the type specimen.
