= Archolaemus luciae =

Conservation status
- Least Concern (IUCN 3.1)

Scientific classification
- Kingdom: Animalia
- Phylum: Chordata
- Class: Actinopterygii
- Order: Gymnotiformes
- Family: Sternopygidae
- Genus: Archolaemus
- Species: A. luciae

Binomial name
- Archolaemus luciae Vari, de Santana & Wosiacki, 2012

Species of fish

Archolaemus luciae is a species of glass knifefish endemic to Brazil where it is found in the Rio Jari, the Rio Trombetas and the Rio Tapajós basins in the eastern Amazon. Also found in the Rio Araguari. This species reaches a length of 49.7 cm (19.6 in).

== Habitat and feeding habits ==
A. luciae are freshwater fishes found in fast flowing, shallow waters, and at the bases of small waterfalls with rocky stream beds where they shelter in crevices from swift currents and prey on insect larvae. A. luciae are nocturnal and use electroreception for navigation and communication.

== Description ==
A. luciae have elongated bodies that are laterally compressed with a continuous, pigmented lateral line running vertically from the base of the head to the end of the caudal filament. The pectoral fins, which are attached posterior to the operculum, are long, broad at the base, and distally pointed. They rely on anal fin swimming, having an anal fin that runs along the length of the underside of the body, having 192–213 soft anal rays. They do not have pelvic or dorsal fins and they have tails that taper. The eyes are small, located on the dorsal portion of the head and posterior to the elongated, subconical snout. The mouth is inferior with a longer upper jaw that overlaps the lower jaw, having multiple rows of small, pointed teeth that form a villiform band along the dentary and premaxilla. Only the anterior and basal margins of the first row of teeth are connected to the premaxilla, giving the teeth mobility with a range between a few degrees and 90 degrees relative to the premaxilla. They have a porous upper lip with raised papillae on the ventral surface and fleshy folds that run anterior to posterior originating at the lip. The head's coloration is dark, the dorsal portion above the upper jaw being darker than the ventral part of the head. The body of A. luciae is darker in color above the distinct lateral line. The base of the anal fin is outlined with dark bars and dark bands form along the lower margin of the body. The rays of the anal fins are darkly pigmented, the anal fins and pectoral fins being dusky. They have small, cycloid scales that cover the body, and the head is scaleless.

== Secondary sexual dimorphism ==
Mature individuals of A. luciae exhibit sexual dimorphism, the snout of mature males being noticeably longer and larger than mature females of this species and other species in this genus. They have sexual reproduction.
