= Archolaemus orientalis =

Conservation status
- Data Deficient (IUCN 3.1)

Scientific classification
- Kingdom: Animalia
- Phylum: Chordata
- Class: Actinopterygii
- Order: Gymnotiformes
- Family: Sternopygidae
- Genus: Archolaemus
- Species: A. orientalis

Binomial name
- Archolaemus orientalis D. J. Stewart, Vari, de Santana & Wosiacki, 2012

Species of fish

Archolaemus orientalis is a species of glass knifefish endemic to Brazil where it is found in the upper Rio São Francisco basin.
