= Eigenmannia guchereauae =

Conservation status
- Near Threatened (IUCN 3.1)

Scientific classification
- Kingdom: Animalia
- Phylum: Chordata
- Class: Actinopterygii
- Order: Gymnotiformes
- Family: Sternopygidae
- Genus: Eigenmannia
- Species: E. guchereauae

Binomial name
- Eigenmannia guchereauae (Meunier, Jégu & Keith, 2014)

Synonyms
- Distocyclus guchereauae

Species of fish

Eigenmannia guchereauae is a species of glass knifefishes found in the Litany River and the Tampoc River, in the Maroni River drainage in French Guiana.

This species reaches a length of 33.1 cm (13.0 in).
