= Eigenmannia robsoni =

Scientific classification
- Kingdom: Animalia
- Phylum: Chordata
- Class: Actinopterygii
- Order: Gymnotiformes
- Family: Sternopygidae
- Genus: Eigenmannia
- Species: E. robsoni

Binomial name
- Eigenmannia robsoni Dutra, Ramos & Menezes, 2022

Species of fish

Eigenmannia robsoni is a species of glass knifefish in the family Sternopygidae. It is found in the Parnaíba basin of north-eastern Brazil.

== Etymology ==
The species name of "robsoni" is in honor of Robson Tamar da Costa Ramos, an ichthyologist, who specialized in the studies of the Caatinga ecoregion, including the Parnaíba river basin.
