= Rhinosternarchus =

Conservation status
- Least Concern (IUCN 3.1)

Scientific classification
- Kingdom: Animalia
- Phylum: Chordata
- Class: Actinopterygii
- Order: Gymnotiformes
- Family: Sternopygidae
- Subfamily: Eigenmanniinae
- Genus: Rhinosternarchus; Dutra, Peixoto, Abrahão, Wosiacki, Menezes & de Santana, 2021
- Species: R. goajira

Binomial name
- Rhinosternarchus goajira (L. P. Schultz, 1949)

Synonyms
- Eigenmannia goajira L. P. Schultz, 1949; Distocyclus goajira (L. P. Schultz, 1949)

Species of fish

Rhinosternarchus is a monospecific genus of freshwater ray-finned fish belonging to the family Sternopygidae, the glass knifefishes. The only species in the genus is Rhinosternarchus goajira. This fish is found in the Lake Maracaibo basin in Colombia and Venezuela. Until 2021, it was placed in the genus Eigenmannia, but phylogenetic studies found it to be a distinct lineage most closely related to Archolaemus.
