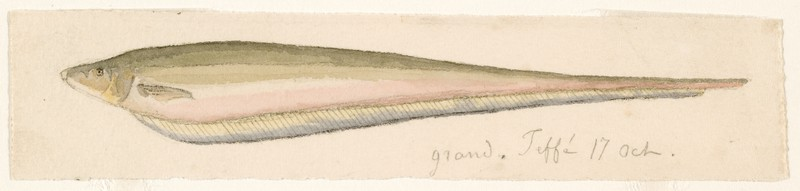
- Sketch by Jacques Burkhardt (1865)

Conservation status
- Least Concern (IUCN 3.1)

Scientific classification
- Kingdom: Animalia
- Phylum: Chordata
- Class: Actinopterygii
- Order: Gymnotiformes
- Family: Sternopygidae
- Genus: Distocyclus
- Species: D. conirostris

Binomial name
- Distocyclus conirostris C. H. Eigenmann & W. R. Allen, 1942

= Distocyclus conirostris =

Species of fish

Distocyclus is a monospecific genus of freshwater ray-finned fish belonging to the family Sternopygidae, the glass knifefishes. The only species in the genus is Distocyclus conirostris which is found in the deep waters (3.8 to 28.3 m, 12 to 93 ft) of the Amazon basin, lower portions of the Potaro River and in major parts of the Rio Orinoco. They are typically found in flood basins, flooded forests, and main river channels. They have often been found gathering in small groups around vegetation, indicating a social nature. The fish has semi-translucent, glass-like pectoral and anal fins. The main body is a ground-like color with a lighter head. The largest currently recorded specimen measures 34.5 cm (13.6 in).

== Ecology ==
Distocyclus conirostris has a tapering, conical snout with the top and bottom jaws being equal in length. The mouth is located terminally. The eyes are located on either side of a bilaterally compressed, elongated body and are covered by a nictitating membrane. The snout contains a uniquely small nasal capsule for the family Sternopygidae. The mouth of Distocyclus conirostris contains a single row of teeth located on the anterior area of the dentary bone, a trait also unique to this species in comparison to the other members of the Sternopygidae.

The fish is covered in cycloid scales and typically has 4 to 5 gills with 4 to 11 small gill rakers. The body lacks any dark bands running laterally down the body, something present in Japigny kirschbaum, another species of the Sternopygidae. The fish also typically has 13–14 precaudal vertebrae, differing significantly from the 20–26 precaudal vertebrae present in the Sternopygus genus.

Distocyclus goajira, a potential sister fish of Distocyclus conirostris, is currently a subject of debate in regards to its phylogenetic position and relationship within either the Distocyclus genus or the Sternopygidae family.

== Behavior ==
Distocyclus conirostris are social fishes who communicate through the use of chirps and modulation of said chirps. These chirps are created by the fish's electric organ, which releases chirps of varying frequencies dependent on social context. It is currently unknown whether or not jamming avoidance response is utilized when encountering other weakly electric knifefish in order to decrease interference between their electrolocation accuracy and their electrocommunication usage. It is unknown whether these chirps are sexually dimorphic or whether they vary individually.

== Reproduction ==
There is little information on specific reproduction of Distocyclus conirostris currently and it is unknown if their use of chirping for communicative purposes is uniquely modulated during spawning season or to reproductive means.

== Conservation ==
Distocyclus conirostris is considered to be of Least Concern by an IUCN 3.1 assessment conducted in 2020.
