= Eigenmannia bumba =

Scientific classification
- Domain: Eukaryota
- Kingdom: Animalia
- Phylum: Chordata
- Class: Actinopterygii
- Order: Gymnotiformes
- Family: Sternopygidae
- Genus: Eigenmannia
- Species: E. bumba

Binomial name
- Eigenmannia bumba Dutra, Ramos & Menezes, 2022

Species of fish

Eigenmannia bumba is a species of glass knifefish in the family Sternopygidae. It is found in the Mearim River basin of north-eastern Brazil.

== Etymology ==
The species epithet “bumba” is in reference to “bumba meu boi” or “boi-bumbá”, a folklore character in northern Brazil.
