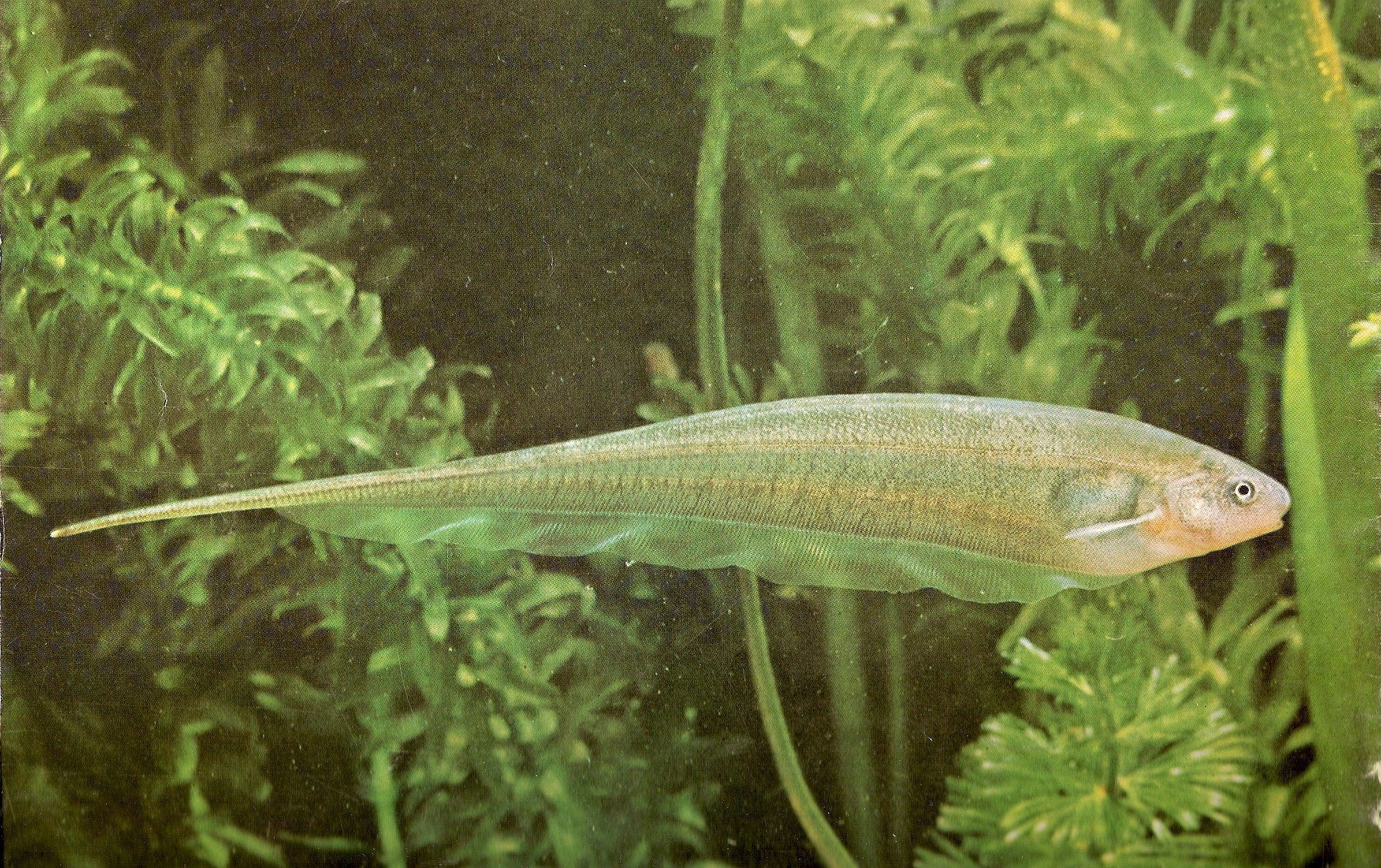
- Eigenmannia virescens

Scientific classification
- Kingdom: Animalia
- Phylum: Chordata
- Class: Actinopterygii
- Order: Gymnotiformes
- Family: Sternopygidae
- Subfamily: Eigenmanniinae; Mago-Leccia, 1978

= Eigenmanniinae =

Subfamily of fishes

Eigenmanniinae is a subfamily of freshwater ray-finned fishes belonging to the family Sternopygidae, the glass knifefishes. The fishes in this subfamily are found in the Neotropics as far north as Panama.

== Taxonomy ==
Eigenmanniinae was first proposed as a subfamily in 1978 by the Venezuelan ichthyologist Francisco Mago Leccia. The validity of this taxon has been regarded as debatable and the 5th edition of Fishes of the World note that it had not been widely accepted. However, the monophyly of this clade has been supported by more recent morphological and molecular analyses.

== Genera ==
Eigenmanniinae contains the following genera:

- Archolaemus Korringa, 1970
- Distocyclus Mago-Leccia. 1978
- Eigenmannia D. S. Jordan & Evermann, 1896
- Japigny Meunier, Jégu & Keith, 2011
- Rhabdolichops Eigenmann & W. R. Allen, 1942
- Rhinosternarchus Dutra, Peixoto, Abrahão, Wosiacki, Menezes & de Santana, 2021
