= Archolaemus ferreirai =

Conservation status
- Least Concern (IUCN 3.1)

Scientific classification
- Kingdom: Animalia
- Phylum: Chordata
- Class: Actinopterygii
- Order: Gymnotiformes
- Family: Sternopygidae
- Genus: Archolaemus
- Species: A. ferreirai

Binomial name
- Archolaemus ferreirai Vari, de Santana & Wosiacki, 2012

Species of fish

Archolaemus ferreirai is a species of glass knifefish endemic to Brazil where it is found in the Rio Mucajaí and Rio Uraricoera in the north-eastern portions of the Amazon basin. This species reaches a length of 34.2 cm (13.5 in).

== Etymology ==
The knife fish is named in honor of Efrem Ferreira (b. 1954), of the Instituto Nacional de Pesquisas da Amazônia, who was one of the collectors of the type specimen.
