= Archolaemus janeae =

Scientific classification
- Kingdom: Animalia
- Phylum: Chordata
- Class: Actinopterygii
- Order: Gymnotiformes
- Family: Sternopygidae
- Genus: Archolaemus
- Species: A. janeae

Binomial name
- Archolaemus janeae Vari, de Santana & Wosiacki, 2012

Species of fish

Archolaemus janeae is a species of glass knifefish endemic to Brazil where it is found in the Rio Xingu and upper Rio Tapajós, Amazon basin. This species reaches a length of 40.2 cm (15.8 in).

== Etymology ==
The knifefish is named in honor of Jane Mertens, of the Humboldt Universität zu Berlin.
