= Gymnotus choco =

Conservation status
- Near Threatened (IUCN 3.1)

Scientific classification
- Kingdom: Animalia
- Phylum: Chordata
- Class: Actinopterygii
- Order: Gymnotiformes
- Family: Gymnotidae
- Genus: Gymnotus
- Species: G. choco

Binomial name
- Gymnotus choco Albert & Crampton, 2003

Species of fish

Gymnotus choco, commonly known as the cuchillo (Spanish for "knife") or beringo, is an electric knifefish. G. choco is distinguished from its cogenerate species group by a color pattern possessing pale yellow bands oriented obliquely, wherein the interband margins are wavy or even irregular; one to three Y-shaped dark bands occur on its body's posterior section; and its pale bands do not extend above the fish's lateral line on its body's anterior two-thirds. G. choco is most similar to G. paraguensis from the Pantanal in Brazil and Paraguay. From the latter, it is distinguished by having a narrower mouth, a more cylindrical body, and a longer preanal distance.

== Description ==
The species has a moderate body size, reaching up to a length of 260 mm (10 in). Its scales are circular or slightly ovoid and are present on the entire postcranial portion of its body. Its gape size is considered large, sometimes extending beyond its posterior nares. Its mouth's position is superior, the lower jaw being longer than the upper jaw, while its chin is fleshy. Its anterior nares are large, almost equal to the diameter of its eyes. The ethmoid region between its anterior nares is broad, with a rounded anterior margin. Its eye position is lateral, and its premaxilla contains 13–15 teeth which are disposed in a single row along the outer margin. These teeth are shaped roughly as an arrowhead anteriorly, while being conical posteriorly. Its maxilla's orientation is vertical, while it is shaped as a rod. It carries one row of 16–17 teeth. The dorsal margin of its opercle is straight, while its texture is cancellous.

The ascending process of the mesopterygoid is long, curved, and robust. Its mandible is long and extended. Its trigeminal canals contain separate fenestrae on the outer surface of the hyomandibula. In juveniles and adults, the cranial fontanels are found closed. It lacks a lateral ethmoid bone, while its parietal is rectangular, shorter than it is wide. Its fifth basibranchial is unossified. Mesocoracoid elongate, its length more than four times its width. The postcleithrum is thin and sickle-shaped, while the cleithrum is narrow. G. choco counts with hemal spines. It notably counts with a single hypaxial electric organ, extending along the entire ventral margin of the fish's body.

In alcohol, its body is a dark brown colour dorsally, grading to a pale brown ventrally. Chromatophores are most densely found along the body's dorsum and near its midline. The fish counts with about 21-22 oblique pale-yellow bands on its ventrolateral surface, extending from the tip of its tail to the pectoral fin's base. It also possesses one to three Y-shaped dark bands in the posterior portion of the body. Interband contrast increases ventrally and caudally and is particularly pronounced in small specimens. The anterior 80% of its dorsum is without banding. Three bands from either side meet on its ventral midline, between the anus and anal fin. It also shows a single band posterior to its last anal fin ray. Its head is not banded, the colour of which is dark brown dorsally, grading to a lighter brown ventrally, with no freckles. Its pectoral fin rays are brown, while its anal fin's membrane is divided into three parts: the anterior 40% is brown, the mid 40% is black, and the posterior 20% is translucent.

== Distribution ==
This species was first found at Baudó River, in the Pacific Slope of Colombia, as well as in other rivers of the Atrato basin, which all drain to the Caribbean Sea. It is named after the Chocó Department, wherein these rivers lie.

== See also ==
- Fish anatomy
