= Archolaemus blax =

Conservation status
- Least Concern (IUCN 3.1)

Scientific classification
- Kingdom: Animalia
- Phylum: Chordata
- Class: Actinopterygii
- Order: Gymnotiformes
- Family: Sternopygidae
- Genus: Archolaemus
- Species: A. blax

Binomial name
- Archolaemus blax Korringa, 1970

Species of fish

Archolaemus blax is a species of glass knifefish endemic to Brazil where it is found in the Rio Tocantins.
