= Japigny =

Conservation status
- Vulnerable (IUCN 3.1)

Scientific classification
- Kingdom: Animalia
- Phylum: Chordata
- Class: Actinopterygii
- Order: Gymnotiformes
- Family: Sternopygidae
- Subfamily: Eigenmanniinae
- Genus: Japigny; Meunier, Jégu & Keith, 2011
- Species: J. kirschbaum

Binomial name
- Japigny kirschbaum Meunier, Jégu & Keith, 2011

Species of fish

Japigny is a monospecific genus of freshwater ray-finned fish belonging to the family Sternopygidae, the glass knifefishes. The only species in the genus is Japigny kirschbaum which was described in 2011 from the Approuague, Mana and Maroni rivers in French Guiana. It reaches up to 22 cm (8.7 in) in total length and is brownish-dusky with a pattern of dark-and-pale broad bands (a similar pattern exists in Sternopygus astrabes and Sternopygus sarae).

== Etymology ==
The knifefish is named in honor of Frank Kirschbaum, of the Humboldt University of Berlin. He was a specialist in gymnotiform fishes because he had spawned and bred several species in the laboratory.
