= Yecua Formation =

Geologic formation in Bolivia

- Stratigraphic range: Late Langhian-Early Messinian (Colloncuran-Huayquerian); ~14–7 Ma
- Underlies: Tariquia Formation
- Overlies: Petaca Formation
- Thickness: ~50–300 m (160–980 ft)

Lithology
- Primary: Mudstone, Sandstone
- Other: Gypsum

Location
- Region: Chaco Basin
- Country: Bolivia

The Yecua Formation is a geological Formation in what is now Bolivia. Studies suggest that the Yecua Formation preserves a coastal setting with humid to semiarid floodplains, shorelines and tidal as well as shallow marine environments including marshes, streams, lakes and brackish bodies of water. There may have been a connection to the Amazon Basin or the Paranaense Sea.

== Bivalves ==
Name	Species	Member	Material	Notes
Tellina	T. sp			
cf. Cyrena	cf. C. sp			
cf. Astarte	cf. A. sp			
cf. Lucina	cf. L. sp			
Senis	S. cf. elongatus			
cf. Corbula or Cymbophora sp.	cf. C. sp			
cf. Nucula	cf. N. sp			

== Gastropods ==
Name	Species	Member	Material	Notes
cf. Gyrodes or Natica sp.				
cf. Turritella	cf. T. sp			

== Crustaceans ==
Name	Species	Member	Material	Notes
Bythocypris	B. sp			
Cyprideis	C. sp			
cf. Balanus	cf. B. sp			
indetermined crabs				

== Vertebrates ==
Name	Species	Member	Material	Notes	Image
cf. Theosodon	cf. T. sp		distal limb bone	a litoptern	
Rodentia indet.			tooth		
Mourasuchus	M. sp.		skull fragments, partial vertebrae & ribs		
Pleurodira			shell elements		
Humboldtichthys	Humboldtichthys kirschbaumi		incompletely preserved anterior portion of the body and posterior head	a Glass Knifefish	
Siluriformes indet.				possibly Ariidae	
Characiformes or Clupeiformes			a scale		
