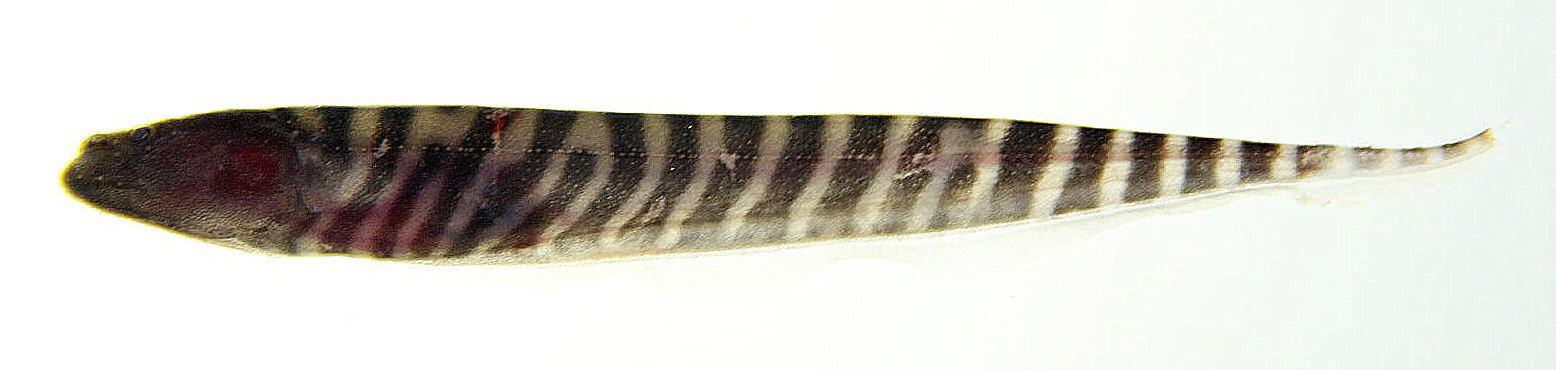
- Gymnotus sp.

Scientific classification
- Kingdom: Animalia
- Phylum: Chordata
- Class: Actinopterygii
- Division: Teleostei
- Order: Gymnotiformes
- Family: Gymnotidae
- Subfamily: Gymnotinae; Rafinesque, 1815
- Genus: Gymnotus; Linnaeus, 1758

Type species
- Gymnotus carapo Linnaeus, 1758

Species
- see text

Synonyms
- Gymnonotus Bloch & Schneider, 1801

= Gymnotus =

Genus of fishes

Gymnotus is a genus of Neotropical freshwater fish in the family Gymnotidae found widely in South America, Central America and southern Mexico (36th parallel south to 18th parallel north). The greatest species richness is found in the Amazon basin. They are sometimes referred to by the English name banded knifefish, although this typically is reserved for the most widespread species, G. carapo. Overall Gymnotus is the most widespread genus in the order Gymnotiformes. They are the only members of the subfamily Gymnotinae.

Although not commonly eaten by humans, some members of this genus are used locally as fishing bait, and occasionally kept in aquariums.

== Habitat ==
Gymnotus occur in most freshwater habitats within their geographic range, with the exception of large and deep river channels, and can tolerate little oxygen (survives by breathing air directly from the water surface) and areas affected by pollution,. One species, G. curupira can survive in moist leaf litter if their aquatic habitat dries out. Large species tend to live near floating vegetation along the edges of large rivers or floodplains, while smaller tend to live among leaf-litter or near banks of small streams. The genus includes both widespread and common species that occur in many different habitat types, and more restricted and rare species that occur in fewer habitats. There are species that remain in the same habitat throughout their lives, while others breed in specific habitats and spend the rest of their time elsewhere. At least as many as five species of Gymnotus may occur together in the same region and habitat.

== Behavior ==
Gymnotus species are nocturnal and mainly feed on aquatic insects, crustaceans, small fish and other small animals, but may also take plant material. Being electric fish, they generate weak electric fields used for navigation, finding prey and communicating with other individuals of their species. At least some species are highly territorial and will react aggressively if detecting the electric field of another individual of their species, especially between conspecific males. The electric signal is species-specific, and tends to differ between males and females. However, Gymnotus are not able to generate a strong electric field that can be used for incapacitating prey or enemies, like the related electric eel.

Nothing is known about the breeding behavior of most members of this genus, but in two species, G. carapo and G. mamiraua, males make a "nest" (a depression in the bottom in the former species and within vegetation in floating meadows in the latter) and guard the young. Additionally, males of at least G. carapo will mouthbrood.

== Appearance ==
Gymnotus are generally brownish with a banded pattern, but this can also be more mottled or spotted in some species. Small scales are always present on these fish. The mouth is superior, meaning it is turned upwards. The anal fin terminates at a point near the tip of the tail. Like other Neotropical knifefish, they often lose their tail due to attacks by predators or aggressive encounters with conspecifics, but they are able to regenerate it. The largest Gymnotus are up to 100 cm (3.3 ft) in total length. Most species reach less than one-third that size and the smallest only around 10 cm (4 in) long.

== Species ==
Gymnotus contains the following recognized species. These have been proposed to be divided into six subgenera. However, these genera were published without a ZooBank registration and so are unavailable. Despite this, some researchers still use the subgeneric treatment.

- Gymnotus anguillaris Hoedeman, 1962
- Gymnotus arapaima Albert & Crampton, 2001
- Gymnotus arapiuns Kim, Crampton & Albert, 2020
- Gymnotus ardilai Maldonado-Ocampo & Albert, 2004
- Gymnotus aripuana Kim, Crampton & Albert, 2020
- Gymnotus bahianus Campos-da-Paz & W. J. E. M. Costa, 1996
- * Gymnotus capanema Milhomem, Crampton, Pieczarka, Shetka, D. S. Silva & Nagamachi, 2012
- Gymnotus capitimaculatus Rangel-Pereira, 2014
- Gymnotus carapo Linnaeus, 1758 (Banded knifefish)
- Gymnotus cataniapo Mago-Leccia ,1994
- Gymnotus chaviro Maxime & Albert, 2009
- Gymnotus chimarrao Cognato, Richer-de-Forges, Albert & Crampton, 2008
- Gymnotus choco Albert, Crampton & Maldonado-Ocampo, 2003
- Gymnotus coatesi La Monte, 1935
- Gymnotus coropinae Hoedeman, 1962
- Gymnotus cuia Craig, Malabarba, Crampton & Albert ,2018
- Gymnotus curupira Crampton, Thorsen & Albert, 2005
- Gymnotus cylindricus LaMonte, 1935
- Gymnotus darwini Campos-da-Paz & de Santana, 2019
- Gymnotus diamantinensis Campos-da-Paz, 2002
- Gymnotus esmeraldas Albert & Crampton, 2003
- Gymnotus eyra Craig, Correa-Roldán, Ortega, Crampton & Albert, 2018
- Gymnotus henni Albert, Crampton & Maldonado-Ocampo, 2003
- Gymnotus inaequilabiatus (Valenciennes, 1839)
- Gymnotus interruptus Rangel-Pereira, 2012
- Gymnotus javari Albert, Crampton & Hagedorn, 2003
- Gymnotus jonasi Albert & Crampton, 2001
- Gymnotus maculosus Albert & R. R. Miller, 1995
- Gymnotus mamiraua Albert & Crampton, 2001
- Gymnotus melanopleura Albert & Crampton, 2001
- Gymnotus obscurus Crampton, Thorsen & Albert, 2005
- Gymnotus occidentalis Craig, Crampton & Albert, 2017
- Gymnotus omarorum Richer-de-Forges, Crampton & Albert, 2009
- Gymnotus onca Albert & Crampton, 2001
- Gymnotus panamensis Albert & Crampton, 2003
- Gymnotus pantanal Fernandes, Albert, Daniel-Silva, C. E. Lopes, Crampton & Almeida-Toledo, 2005
- Gymnotus pantherinus (Steindachner, 1908)
- Gymnotus paraguensis Albert & Crampton, 2003
- Gymnotus pedanopterus Mago-Leccia, 1994
- Gymnotus refugio Giora & Malabarba, 2016
- Gymnotus riberalta Craig, Correa-Roldán, Ortega, Crampton & Albert, 2018
- Gymnotus stenoleucus Mago-Leccia, 1994
- Gymnotus sylvius Albert & Fernandes-Matioli, 1999
- Gymnotus talian Cassaro, Gonçalves, Campos-da-Paz, Dutra, & Datovo, 2026
- Gymnotus tigre Albert & Crampton, 2003
- Gymnotus tiquie Maxime, F. C. T. Lima & Albert, 2011
- Gymnotus ucamara Crampton, Lovejoy & Albert, 2003
- Gymnotus varzea Crampton, Thorsen & Albert, 2005
