= Rhabdolichops =

Scientific classification
- Kingdom: Animalia
- Phylum: Chordata
- Class: Actinopterygii
- Division: Teleostei
- Order: Gymnotiformes
- Family: Sternopygidae
- Subfamily: Eigenmanniinae
- Genus: Rhabdolichops; C. H. Eigenmann & W. R. Allen, 1942

Type species
- Rhabdolichops longicaudatus Eigenmann & Allen, 1942

Synonyms
- Guichthys Fernández-Yépez, 1968

Genus of fishes

Rhabdolichops is a genus of glass knifefishes found in Amazon, Orinoco and Maroni basins in tropical South America. They live near the bottom in main river channels, floodplains (including flooded forest like igapó) and lagoons, and are typically found in relatively deep waters.

Rhabdolichops are typically overall grayish, dusky or semi-translucent resulting in whitish/pinkish color. There are two species groups: One (including most species) where the pectoral fins are relatively short and without conspicuous pigmentation, and another (including R. lundbergi and R. nigrimans) where they are relatively long and all dark or dark at the tip. Depending on the exact species, they have a maximum total length of 16–49 cm (6.5–19.5 in). They feed on small invertebrates such as aquatic insect larvae and zooplankton.

== Species ==
Rhabdolichops contains the following valid species:

- Rhabdolichops caviceps (Fernández-Yépez, 1968)
- Rhabdolichops eastwardi Lundberg & Mago-Leccia, 1986
- Rhabdolichops electrogrammus Lundberg & Mago-Leccia, 1986
- Rhabdolichops jegui Keith & Meunier 2000
- Rhabdolichops lundbergi Correa, Crampton & Albert, 2006
- Rhabdolichops navalha Correa, Crampton & Albert, 2006
- Rhabdolichops nigrimans Correa, Crampton & Albert, 2006
- Rhabdolichops stewarti Lundberg & Mago-Leccia, 1986
- Rhabdolichops troscheli (Kaup, 1857)
- Rhabdolichops zareti Lundberg & Mago-Leccia, 1986
