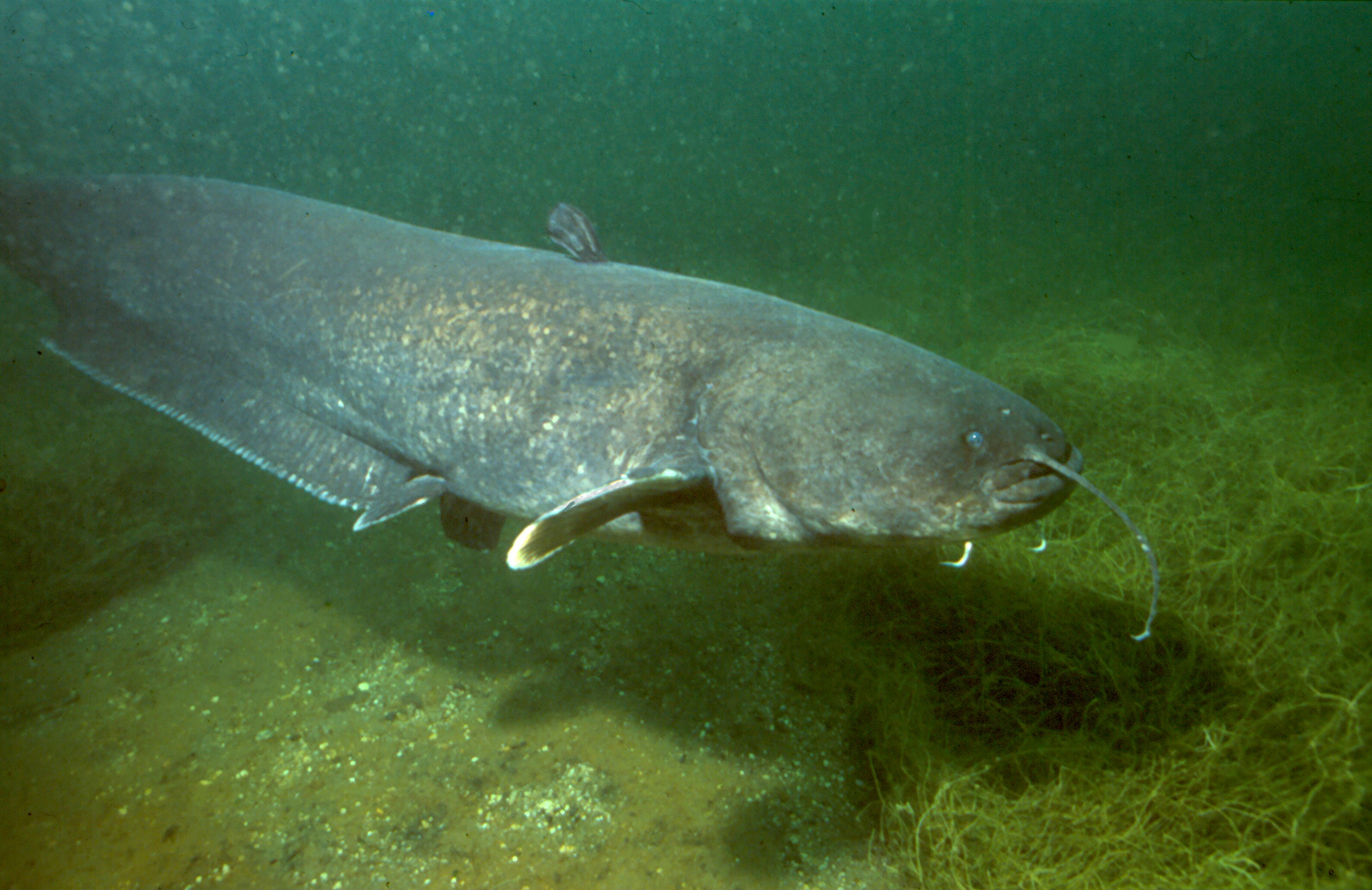
- Silurus glanis
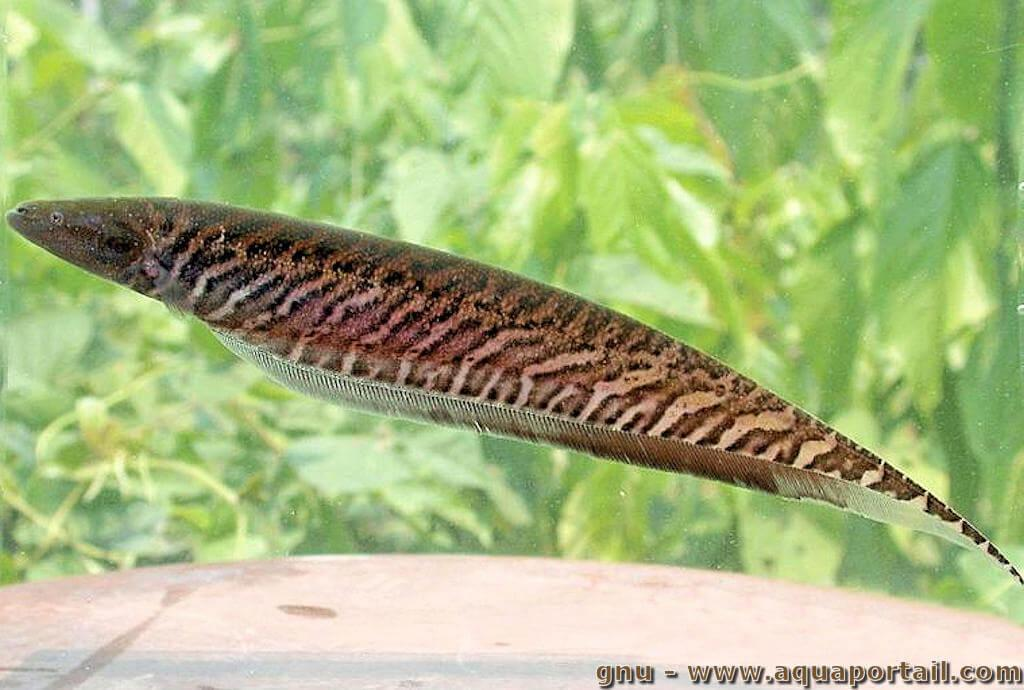
- Gymnotus carapo

Scientific classification
- Kingdom: Animalia
- Phylum: Chordata
- Class: Actinopterygii
- Cohort: Otocephala
- Superorder: Ostariophysi
- (unranked): Otophysi
- Clade: Siluriphysi; S. V. Fink & W. L. Fink, 1996

= Siluriphysi =

Clade of fishes

Siluriphysi is a clade of ray-finned fishes within the superorder Ostariophysi. The clade contains the catfishes in the order Siluriformes and the order Gymnotiformes, the Neotropical knifefishes. The subseries was named in 1996 by Fink and Fink and is recognised in the 5th edition of Fishes of the World, but other authorities do not recognise this clade.

== Orders ==
- Siluriformes O. P. Hay, 1929 (Catfishes)
- Gymnotiformes Regan, 1911 (Neotropical knifefishes)
