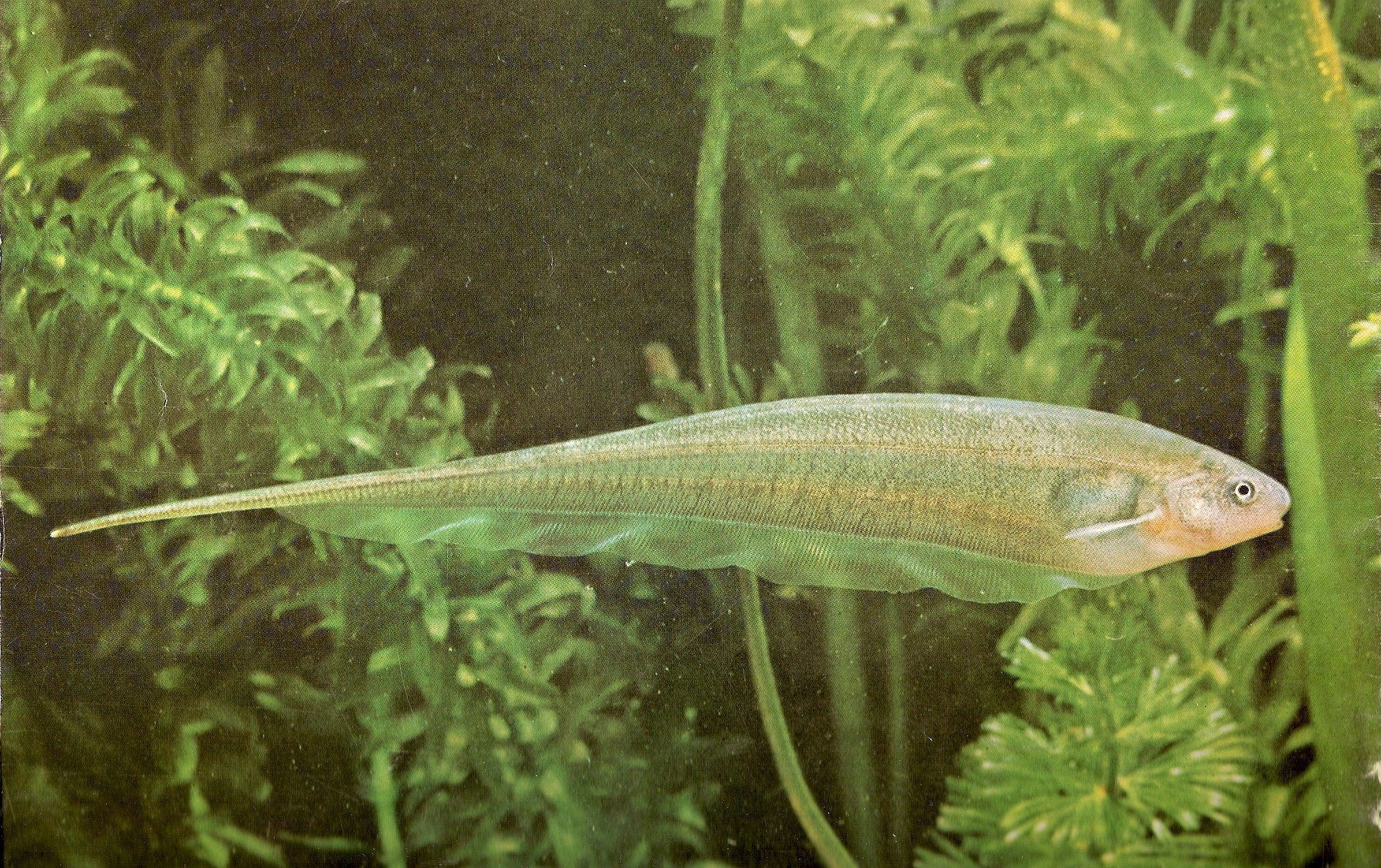
- Eigenmannia virescens

Scientific classification
- Kingdom: Animalia
- Phylum: Chordata
- Class: Actinopterygii
- Order: Gymnotiformes
- Family: Sternopygidae
- Subfamily: Eigenmanniinae
- Genus: Eigenmannia; D. S. Jordan & Evermann, 1896

Type species
- Sternopygus humboldtii Steindachner, 1878

Synonyms
- Cryptops C. H. Eigenmann, 1894

= Eigenmannia =

Genus of fishes

Eigenmannia is a genus of fish in the family Sternopygidae (glass knifefishes) native to tropical and subtropical South America (south to the Río de la Plata Basin), and Panama. They are typically found in slow-flowing streams, along the edge of large rivers, in deep river channels and in floodplains, and the genus also includes E. vicentespelaea, the only cave-adapted knifefish. Eigenmannia are often found near submerged roots, aquatic plants and floating meadows.

Depending on the exact species, they have a maximum total length of 14.3–49.6 cm (6–20 in). They are nocturnal, and feed on small invertebrates such as aquatic insect larvae and zooplanktonic crustaceans.

== Species ==
As of May 2025, these are the recognized species in this genus:

- Eigenmannia antonioi Peixoto, Dutra & Wosiacki, 2015
- Eigenmannia besouro Peixoto & Wosiacki, 2016
- Eigenmannia bumba Dutra, Ramos & Menezes, 2022
- Eigenmannia cacuria Dutra, Ramos & Menezes, 2022
- Eigenmannia camposi Herrera-Collazos, Galindo-Cuervo, Maldonado-Ocampo & Rincón-Sandoval, 2020
- Eigenmannia catira Cardoso & Dutra, 2023
- Eigenmannia correntes Campos-da Paz & Queiroz 2017
- Eigenmannia desantanai Peixoto, Dutra & Wosiacki 2015
- Eigenmannia dutrai Peixoto, Pastana & Ballen, 2021
- Eigenmannia guairaca Peixoto, Dutra & Wosiacki, 2015
- Eigenmannia guchereauae (Meunier, Jégu & Keith, 2014)
- Eigenmannia humboldtii (Steindachner, 1878)
- Eigenmannia limbata (Schreiner & Miranda-Ribeiro, 1903)
- Eigenmannia loretana Waltz & Albert, 2018
- Eigenmannia macrops (Boulenger, 1897)
- Eigenmannia macuxi Dutra, Peixoto, Donin, de Santana & Menezes, 2024.
- Eigenmannia magoi Herrera-Collazos, Galindo-Cuervo, Maldonado-Ocampo & Rincón-Sandoval, 2020
- Eigenmannia matintapereira Peixoto, Dutra & Wosiacki, 2015
- Eigenmannia meeki Dutra, de Santana & Wosiacki, 2017
- Eigenmannia microstoma (Reinhardt, 1852)
- Eigenmannia muirapinima Peixoto, Dutra & Wosiacki, 2015
- Eigenmannia nigra Mago-Leccia, 1994
- Eigenmannia oradens Dutra, Peixoto, de Santana & Wosiacki, 2018
- Eigenmannia pavulagem Peixoto, Dutra & Wosiacki, 2015
- Eigenmannia robsoni Dutra, Ramos & Menezes, 2022
- Eigenmannia sayona Peixoto & Waltz, 2017
- Eigenmannia sirius Peixoto & Ohara, 2019
- Eigenmannia trilineata López & Castello, 1966
- Eigenmannia vicentespelaea Triques, 1996
- Eigenmannia virescens (Valenciennes, 1836)
- Eigenmannia waiwai Peixoto, Dutra & Wosiacki, 2015
- Eigenmannia zenuensis Herrera-Collazos, Galindo-Cuervo, Maldonado-Ocampo & Rincón-Sandoval, 2020
