= Mary Hagedorn =

American physiologist and marine biologist

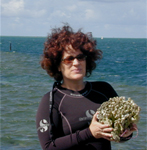
- Mary Hagedorn working in the field with coral species
- Born: Mary Margaret Hagedorn; September 12, 1954 (age 71); Long Island Sound, Connecticut
- Education: Bachelor's and master's degrees from Tufts University, Ph.D from Scripps Institution of Oceanography at University of California
- Known for: Pioneering and refining a new process in aquatic cryopreservation: the freezing of coral sperm and eggs for future use
- Awards: Received the George E. Burch Fellowship in Theoretic Medicine and Affiliated Theoretic Sciences in 2000 and nominated as a Pew Fellow in Marine Conservation in 2005
- Scientific career
- Fields: Physiology, Marine Biology
- Workplaces: Research Scientist at National Zoological Park and Smithsonian Conservation Biology Institute; Affiliate Faculty at the Hawaii Institute of Marine Biology

Mary Margaret Hagedorn (born September 12, 1954) is a US marine biologist specialised in physiology who has developed a conservation program for coral species, using the principles of cryobiology, the study of cellular systems under cold conditions, and cryopreservation, the freezing of sperm and embryos.

== Life ==
Mary Hagedorn grew up in Long Island Sound, Connecticut, where she developed an interest in oceans and sea life. From then on, Hagedorn knew she wanted a job in aquatic species research. She received her bachelor's and master's degrees in Biology from Tufts University, and she earned her Ph.D. in Marine Biology from the Scripps Institution of Oceanography of the University of California at San Diego. Upon graduation, Hagedorn studied fish physiology.

After a trip to the Amazon left two of her colleagues dead, Hagedorn reached a turning point in her career. She decided to stop studying electric fish and focus her physiological efforts on coral, which were impacted by the warming of the oceans. Hagedorn now spearheads a global conservation effort for coral through the Smithsonian, named the Reef Recovery Initiative, which includes freezing coral from 2 major oceans to preserve the wildlife for future rehabilitation.
