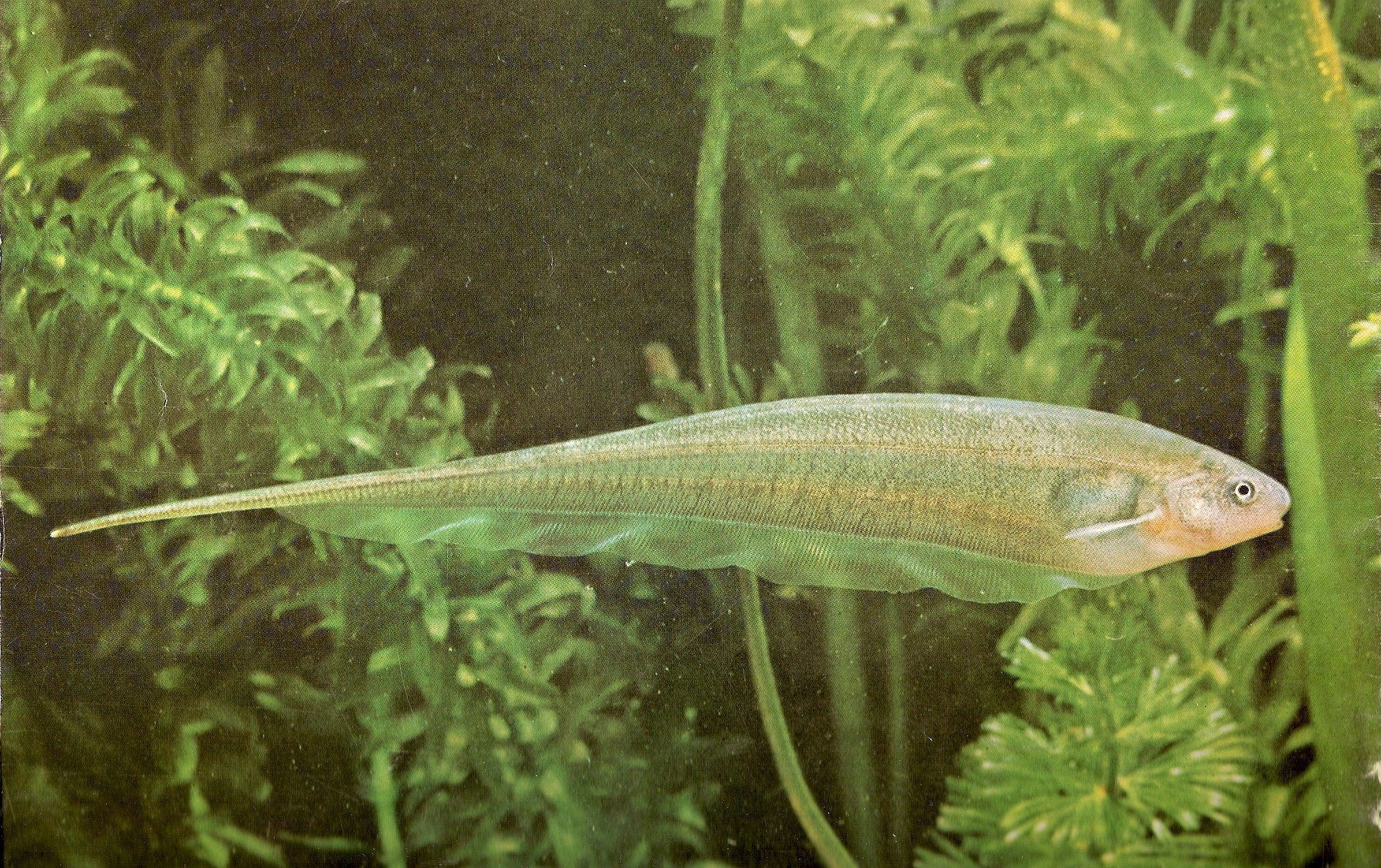
- Eigenmannia virescens
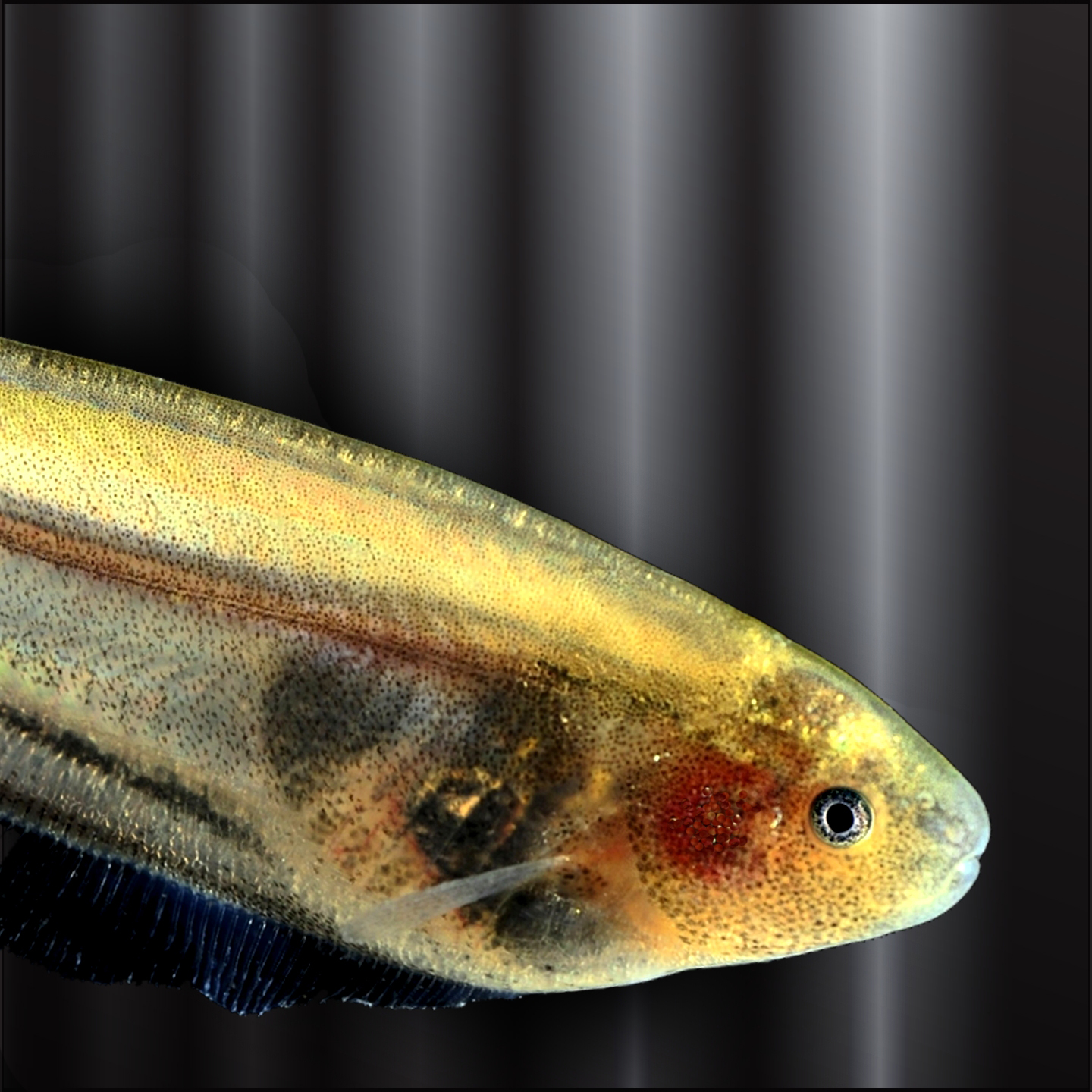
- Eigenmannia virescens head

Conservation status
- Least Concern (IUCN 3.1)

Scientific classification
- Kingdom: Animalia
- Phylum: Chordata
- Class: Actinopterygii
- Order: Gymnotiformes
- Family: Sternopygidae
- Genus: Eigenmannia
- Species: E. virescens

Binomial name
- Eigenmannia virescens ( Valenciennes, 1847)

Synonyms
- Stermarchus viriscens Valenciennes, 1847; Sternopygus lineatus Müller & Troschel, 1849; Sternopygus tumifrons Müller & Troschel, 1849

= Eigenmannia virescens =

Species of fish

Eigenmannia virescens, the glass knifefish, is a weakly electric freshwater fish found across South America. It is marketed as an aquarium fish.

== Description ==
The appendix on the body has black lines running through the bottom of the sides, with the most intense line running on the anal fin.

Like all members of its order, it is distinguished by its ability to produce electric fields. This is achieved by discharging an electric organ in the tail.

== Distribution ==
This species is widely distributed in the rivers of South America. Their range extends from the Magdalena River basin in Colombia to the Rio de La Plata in Argentina, including Peru, Bolivia, Paraguay, Uruguay, Brazil, Venezuela, Guyana, and Suriname.

== See also ==
- Feature detection
