= Archolaemus =

Scientific classification
- Domain: Eukaryota
- Kingdom: Animalia
- Phylum: Chordata
- Class: Actinopterygii
- Order: Gymnotiformes
- Family: Sternopygidae
- Subfamily: Eigenmanniinae
- Genus: Archolaemus; Korringa, 1970

Type species
- Archolaemus blax Korringa, 1970

Genus of fishes

Archolaemus is a genus of South American glass knifefishes, family Sternopygidae. They occur in fast-flowing sections of rivers, including rapids, in the Amazon, Tocantins, São Francisco and Araguari basins. Depending on the exact species, they reach up to about 20–50 cm (8–20 in) in total length. During the day they hide in rocky crevices, but during the night they are active and feed on small invertebrates such as aquatic insect larvae.

== Species ==
There are currently six recognized species in this genus:

- Archolaemus blax Korringa, 1970
- Archolaemus ferreirai Vari, de Santana & Wosiacki, 2012
- Archolaemus janeae Vari, de Santana & Wosiacki, 2012
- Archolaemus luciae Vari, de Santana & Wosiacki, 2012
- Archolaemus orientalis D. J. Stewart, Vari, de Santana & Wosiacki, 2012
- Archolaemus santosi Vari, de Santana & Wosiacki, 2012
