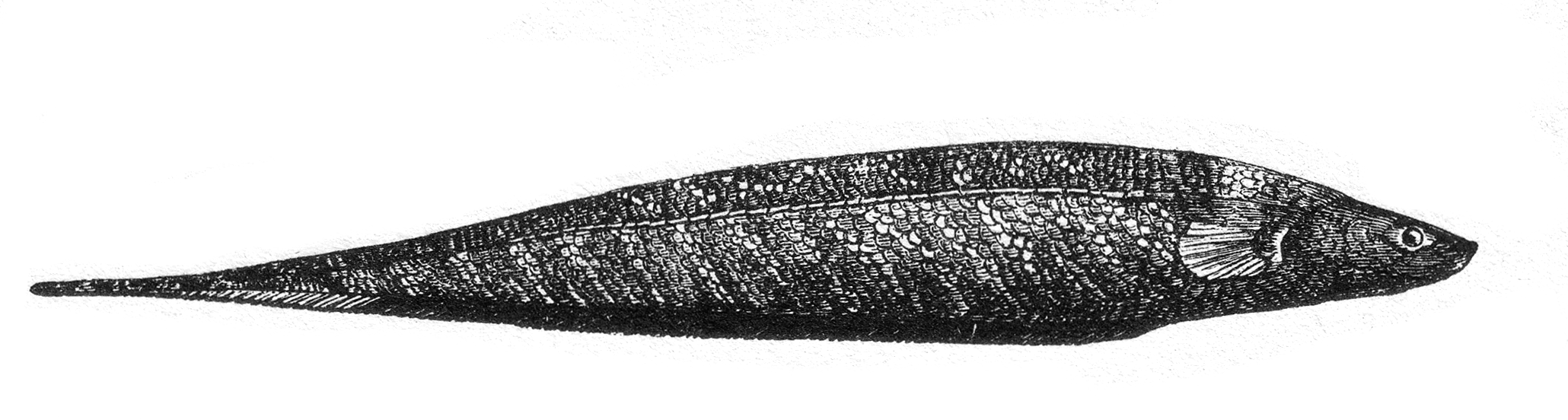

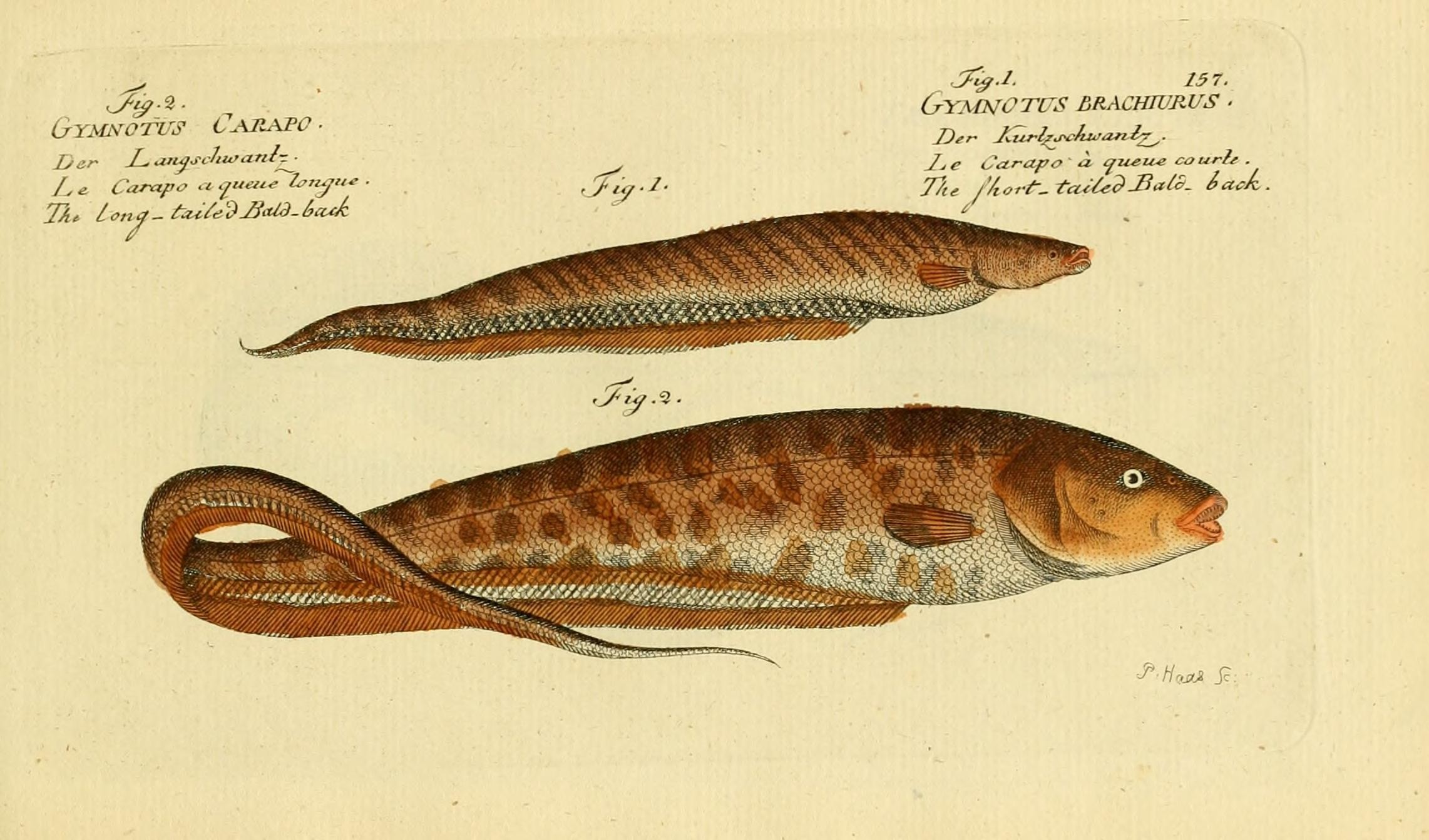
- Old illustrations (uppermost showing shape well, lower typical colors)

Conservation status
- Least Concern (IUCN 3.1)

Scientific classification
- Kingdom: Animalia
- Phylum: Chordata
- Class: Actinopterygii
- Division: Teleostei
- Order: Gymnotiformes
- Family: Gymnotidae
- Genus: Gymnotus
- Species: G. carapo

Binomial name
- Gymnotus carapo Linnaeus, 1758

Synonyms
- Gymnotus brachiurus Bloch, 1786; Gymnotus putaol Lacépède, 1800; Sternopygus carapus Günther, 1870; Gymnotus carapo australis Craig, Crampton & Albert, 2017; Gymnotus carapo madeirensis Craig, Crampton & Albert, 2017; Gymnotus carapo occidentalis Craig, Crampton & Albert, 2017; Gymnotus carapo orientalis Craig, Crampton & Albert, 2017; Gymnotus carapo septentrionalis Craig, Crampton & Albert, 2017

= Banded knifefish =

Species of fish

The banded knifefish (Gymnotus carapo) is a species of gymnotiform knifefish native to a wide range of freshwater habitats in South America. It is the most widespread species of Gymnotus, but it has frequently been confused with several relatives, including some found outside its range like the Central America G. maculosus. The English name "banded knifefish" is sometimes used for the entire genus Gymnotus instead of only the species G. carapo.

== Range and habitat ==
This South American fish is found in the Amazon, Orinoco and Río de la Plata basins, as well as rivers in the Guianas, northeastern Brazil (only those exiting along the country's northern coast, such as Parnaíba) and northern Argentina (south to the 36th parallel south), and in Trinidad. This makes it the most widespread species of Gymnotus.

G. carapo occurs in virtually any freshwater habitat in its range, such as rivers and streams (both slow- and fast-flowing), floodplains, estuaries, swamps and lakes. However, it is not known from deep river channels. It can survive in low-oxygen habitats by breathing air with a modified swim bladder, areas affected by pollution, and for a period on land if its aquatic habitat dries out.

== Appearance ==
G. carapo reaches up to 76 cm (30 in) in total length, but it rarely surpasses 42 cm (17 in) and depending on exact population average is 15–26 cm (6–10 in). In a study where two breeding males were located one was 18 cm (7 in) long and the other 33.5 cm (13 in). It is brown with an oblique banded pattern. The strength and details of this pattern varies, both individually and depending on region. There are also some morphometric variations depending on location. A review found that these were insufficient for recognizing the populations as separate species, but did recommend recognizing them as subspecies: G. c. carapo (French Guiana and Suriname), G. c. australis (Río de la Plata basin), G. c. caatingaensis (Parnaíba river basin), G. c. madeirensis (upper Madeira river basin), G. c. occidentalis (Western Amazon, and Rio Negro and Essequibo river basins), G. c. orientalis (Eastern Amazon) and G. c. septentrionalis (Orinoco river basin and Trinidad).

== Behavior ==
This species, as with all Gymnotiformes, is an electric fish that has the capability to generate weak electric charges, and then measure the disturbance in the field of electricity created. This system is used for navigation, finding prey and communicating with other G. carapo. They are highly territorial and will react aggressively if detecting the electric field of another individual of their species. However, they are not able to generate a strong electric field that can be used for incapacitating prey or enemies, like the related electric eel.

G. carapo are nocturnal and eat benthos, such as worms, insects, crustaceans, small fish and plant material.

The male takes care of the young by mouth brooding, and making and watching over a "nest", a depression in the bottom where the female lays the eggs.
