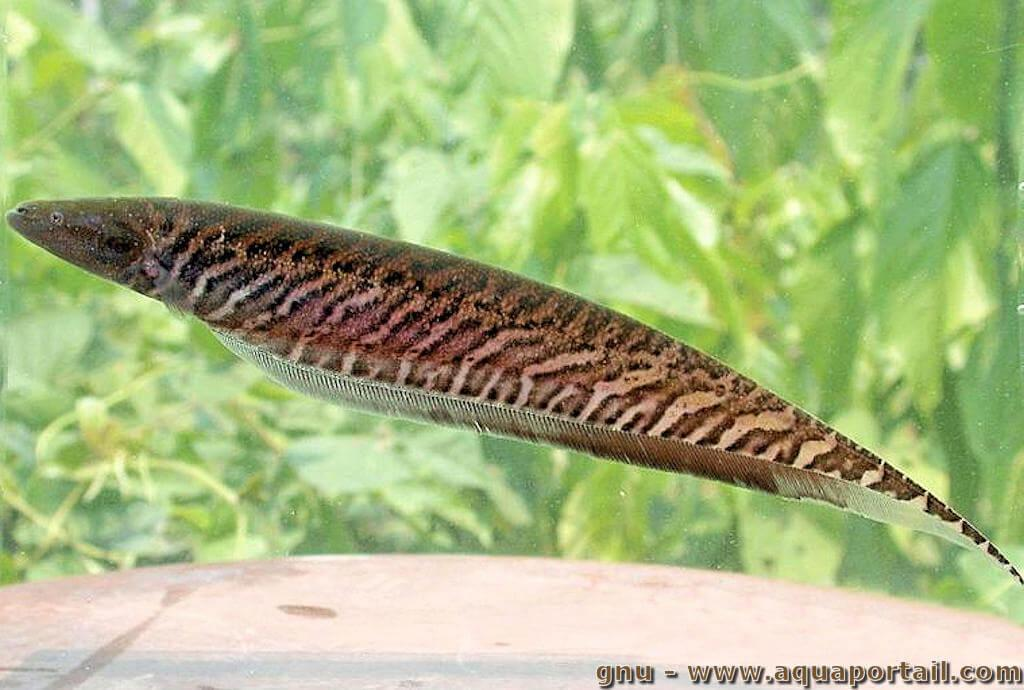
- Banded knifefish (Gymnotus carapo)
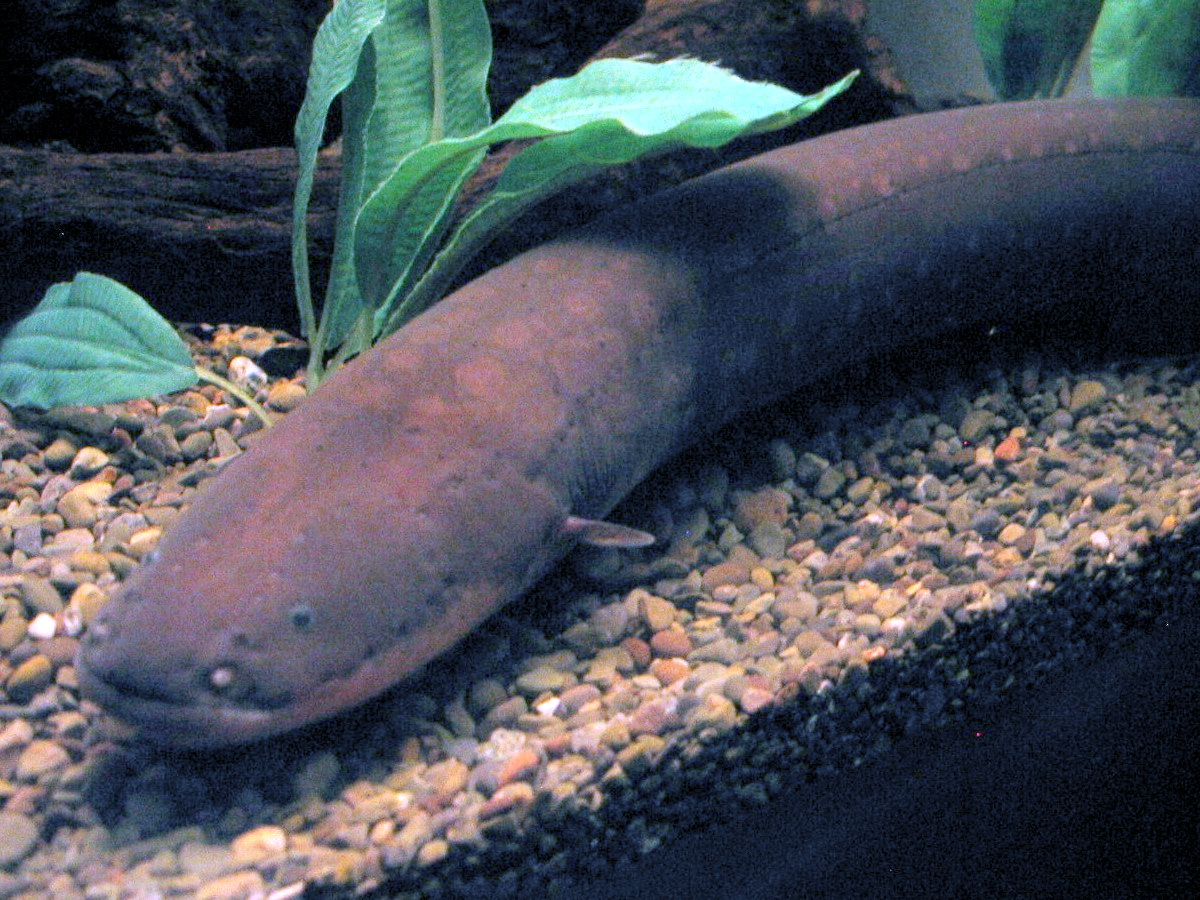
- Electric eel, Electrophorus electricus

Scientific classification
- Kingdom: Animalia
- Phylum: Chordata
- Class: Actinopterygii
- Order: Gymnotiformes
- Family: Gymnotidae; Rafinesque, 1815

Genera
- see text

= Naked-back knifefish =

Family of freshwater fishes

The naked-back knifefishes are a family, the Gymnotidae, of ray-finned fishes belonging to the order Gymnotiformes. The fishes in this family are found only in fresh waters of Central America and South America. All have organs adapted to electroreception. The family has about 43 valid species in two genera. These fish are nocturnal and mostly occur in quiet waters from deep rivers to swamps. In strongly flowing waters, they may bury themselves.

== Physical characteristics ==
Like the other gymnotiforms, gymnotids have classic knifefish bodies. The body is long and eel-like, the dorsal fin and pelvic fins are absent, and the anal fin is extremely long and used for movement.

The electric eels of the genus Electrophorus are the largest species, and they are capable of generating both strong (up to 600 volts) and weak (<1 V) electric discharges, for use in predation and communication/navigation, respectively. The electric eel (E. electricus) is the largest of the gymnotiform fishes, growing up to more than 2 m (6.6 ft) length. Species of Gymnotus range from about 10 to 100 cm (0.3 to 3.3 ft) in total length.

These knife fishes also use electricity to assist in their movement and navigation in the water due to their limited vision.

== Genera ==
According to Eschmeyer's Catalog of Fishes, there are 43 species in two genera, each in a monotypic subfamily:

- Subfamily Electrophorinae Gill, 1872
  - Genus Electrophorus Gill, 1864 (3 species)
- Subfamily Gymnotinae Rafinesque, 1815
  - Genus Gymnotus Linnaeus, 1758 (40 species)

Historically, Electrophorus was in a separate family, Electrophoridae, and ITIS continues to do this, though this is contradicted by available evidence and not followed by other authorities.
