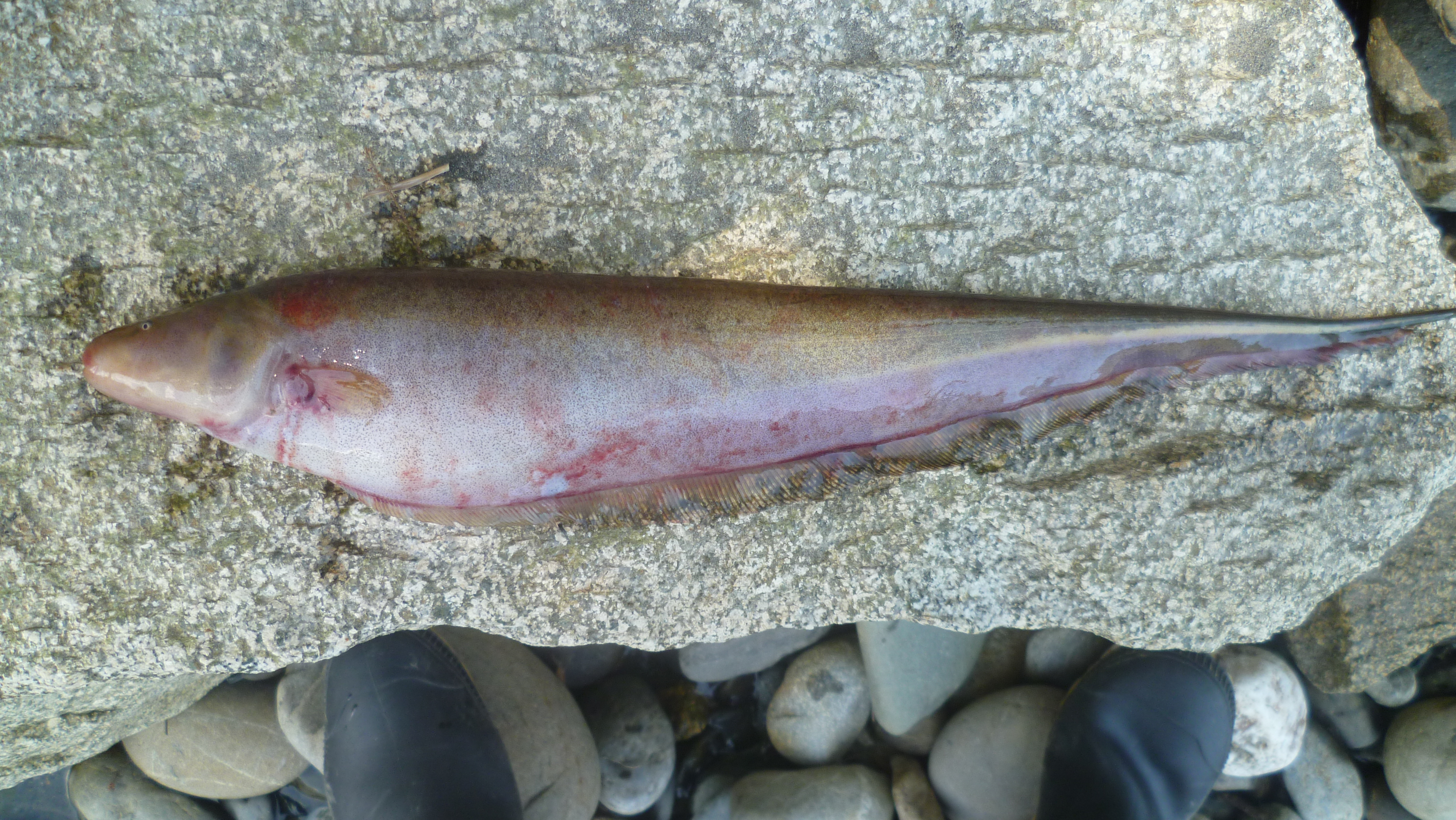
- Sternopygus aequilabiatus

Scientific classification
- Kingdom: Animalia
- Phylum: Chordata
- Class: Actinopterygii
- Order: Gymnotiformes
- Family: Sternopygidae
- Subfamily: Sternopyginae; Cope, 1871
- Genus: Sternopygus; J. P. Müller & Troschel, 1846

Type species
- Gymnotus aequilabiatus Humboldt, 1805

Synonyms
- Carapus Cuvier, 1816; Gymnotes Gill, 1864; Hildatia Fernández-Yépez, 1968

= Sternopygus =

Genus of fishes

Sternopygus is a genus of glass knifefishes found in tropical and subtropical South America (south to the Río de la Plata Basin), and Panama. It is the only extant member of the subfamily Sternopyginae, with the related fossil genus †Humboldtichthys also known from Bolivia.

They inhabit a wide range of freshwater habitats, from fast-flowing rivers to essentially static waters in floodplains, and shallow habitats to the bottom of deep rivers. S. macrurus will even visit brackish mangroves to feed.

They are medium to large knifefish, with a maximum total length of 23–140 cm (0.8–4.6 ft) depending on the exact species. They feed on invertebrates, small fish and fruits. Most members of Gymnotiformes are nocturnal, but Sternopygus are both nocturnal and diurnal.

== Species ==
There are currently twelve recognized species in this genus.

- Sternopygus aequilabiatus (Humboldt, 1805)
- Sternopygus arenatus (Eydoux & Souleyet, 1850)
- Sternopygus astrabes Mago-Leccia, 1994
- Sternopygus branco Crampton, Hulen & Albert, 2004
- Sternopygus dariensis Meek & Hildebrand 1916
- Sternopygus embera Torgersen, Galindo-Cuervo, Ortega-Lara, Lujan, Reis & Albert, 2026
- Sternopygus macrurus (Bloch & Schneider, 1801) (Longtail knifefish)
- Sternopygus obtusirostris Steindachner, 1881
- Sternopygus pejeraton Schultz, 1949
- Sternopygus sabaji Torgersen & Albert, 2022
- Sternopygus sarae Torgersen, Galindo-Cuervo, Reis & Albert, 2023
- Sternopygus xingu Albert & Fink, 1996
