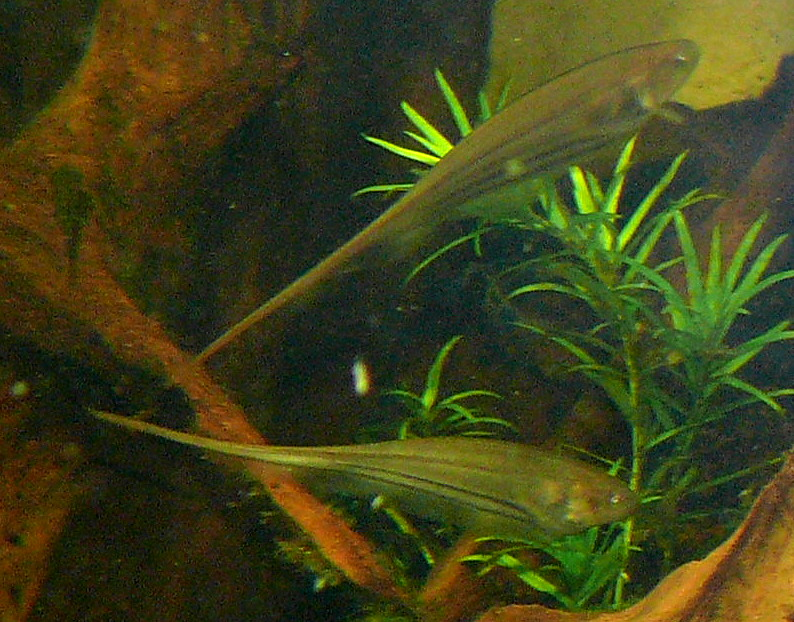
- Eigenmannia virescens

Scientific classification
- Kingdom: Animalia
- Phylum: Chordata
- Class: Actinopterygii
- (unranked): Otophysi
- Clade: Siluriphysi
- Order: Gymnotiformes
- Family: Sternopygidae; Cope, 1871

= Glass knifefish =

Glass knifefishes Temporal range: Late Miocene–Recent

Family of fishes

Glass knifefishes are fishes in the family Sternopygidae in the order Gymnotiformes. Species are also known as rattail knifefishes.

These fishes inhabit freshwater streams and rivers in Panama and South America. Many species are specialized for life in the deep (more than 20 m or 66 ft) swiftly moving waters of large river channels, like that of the Amazon and its major tributaries where they have been observed swimming vertically. Sternopygus species inhabit both streams and rivers.

Many species are highly compressed laterally and translucent in life. These fish have villiform (brush-like) teeth on the upper and lower jaws. The snout is relatively short. The eyes are relatively large, with a diameter equal to or greater than the distance between nares. The anal fin originates at the isthmus (the strip of flesh on the ventral surface between the gill covers). The maximum length is 140 cm (55 in) in Sternopygus macrurus.

Eigenmannia vicentespelaea is the only cave-dwelling gymnotiform. Humboldtichthys kirschbaumi (formerly genus Ellisella) from Upper Miocene of Bolivia is the only fossil gymnotiform.

These fish have a tone-like electric organ discharge (EOD) that occurs monophasically.

Some of these species are aquarium fishes.

== Genera ==
There are 30 living species of glass knifefish, grouped into seven genera:

- Subfamily Eigenmanniinae Mago-Leccia, 1978 (glass knifefishes)
  - Genus Archolaemus Korringa, 1970
  - Genus Distocyclus Mago-Leccia 1978
  - Genus Eigenmannia Jordan & Evermann, 1896
  - Genus Japigny Meunier, Jégu & Keith, 2011
  - Genus Rhabdolichops C. H. Eigenmann & Allen, 1942
  - Genus Rhinosternarchus Dutra, Peixoto, Abrahão, Wosiacki, Menezes & de Santana, 2021
- Subfamily Sternopyginae Cope, 1871 (rattail knifefishes)
  - Genus Sternopygus Müller & Troschel, 1846
  - Genus †Humboldtichthys (fossil, Upper Miocene)
