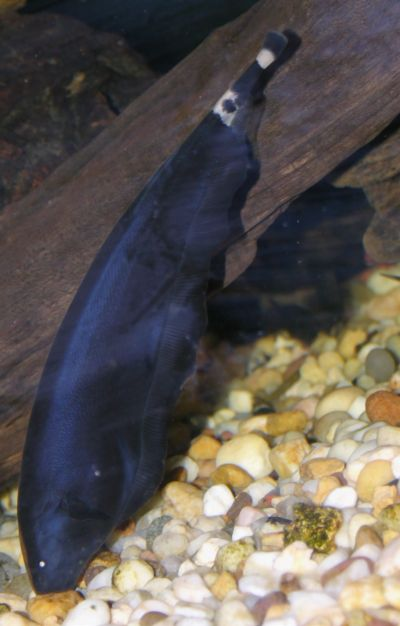
- Black ghost knifefish, (Apteronotidae)
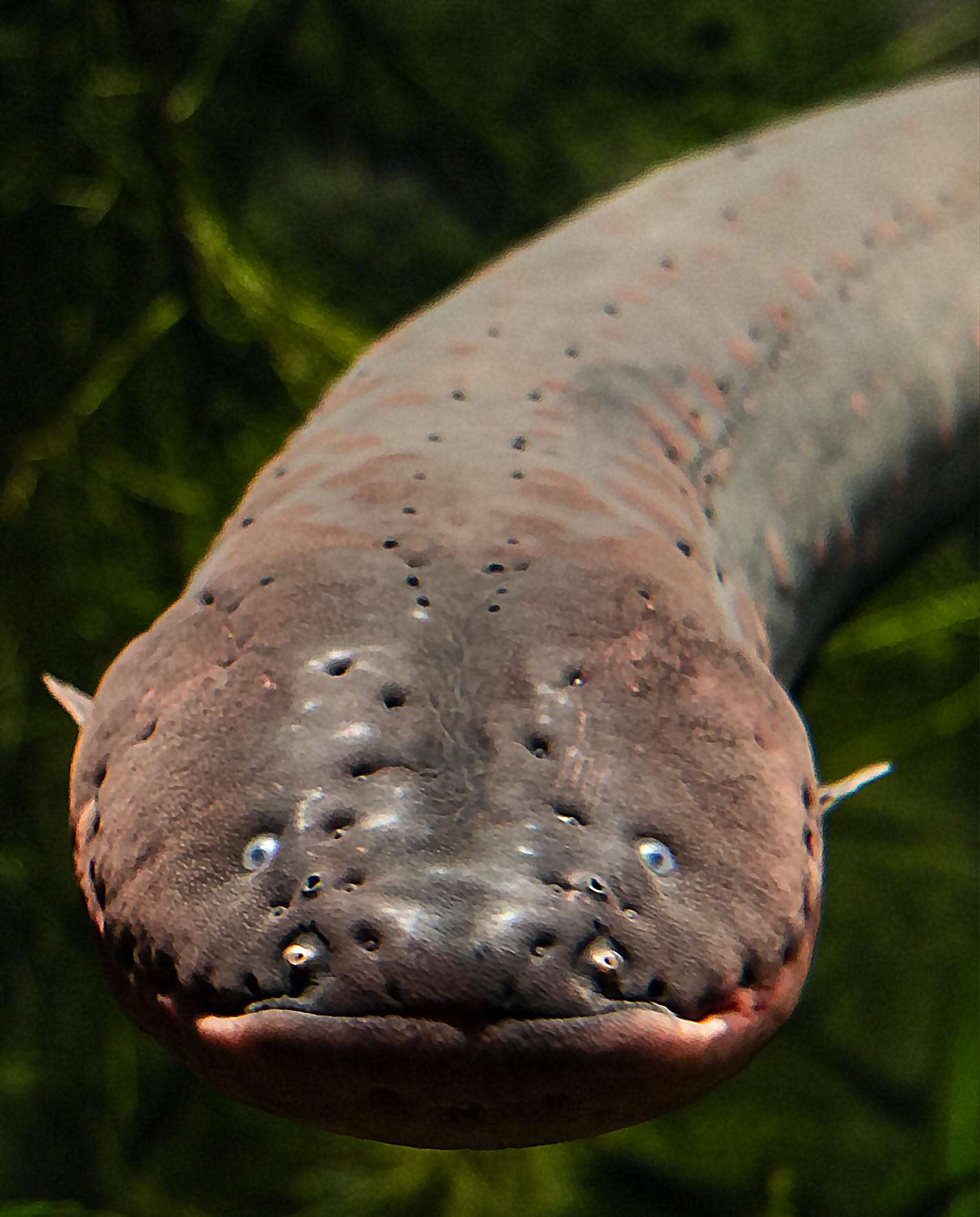
- Electric eel (Gymnotidae)

Scientific classification
- Kingdom: Animalia
- Phylum: Chordata
- Class: Actinopterygii
- Division: Teleostei
- Clade: Siluriphysi
- Order: Gymnotiformes; Regan, 1912

Type species
- Gymnotus carapo Linnaeus, 1758

Suborders
- Pulseoidei; Sinusoidei

= Gymnotiformes =

Gymnotiformes Temporal range: Late Jurassic –Recent

Order of bony fishes

The Gymnotiformes /dʒɪmˈnɒtɪfɔːrmiːz/ are an order of teleost bony fishes commonly known as Neotropical knifefish or South American knifefish, which inhabit fresh water (the only exceptions are species that occasionally may visit brackish water to feed). These mostly nocturnal fish have long bodies and swim using undulations of their elongated anal fin. They are electric fish, are capable of producing electric fields for various purposes, such as detecting prey, for navigation, communication, and, in the case of the electric eels (Electrophorus spp.), attack and defense. A few species are familiar to the aquarium trade, such as the black ghost knifefish (Apteronotus albifrons), the glass knifefish (Eigenmannia virescens), and the banded knifefish (Gymnotus carapo).

== Description ==
Gymnotiformes are generally slender fish with narrow bodies and tapering tails, hence the common name of "knifefishes". They have neither pelvic fins nor dorsal fins, but do possess greatly elongated anal fins that stretch along almost the entire underside of their bodies. The fish swim by rippling this fin, keeping their bodies rigid. This means of propulsion allows them to move backwards as easily as they move forward.

The caudal fin is absent, or in the ghost knifefish (Apteronotidae), greatly reduced. The gill opening is restricted. The anal opening is under the head or the pectoral fins.

Most gymnotiforms are weakly electric, capable of active electrolocation but not of delivering shocks. The electric eels, genus Electrophorus, are strongly electric; despite the superficial resemblance, they are not closely related to the true eels of order Anguilliformes.

=== Locomotion ===
Ghost knifefish have approximately one hundred and fifty fin rays along its "ribbon-fin" (anal fin). These individual fin rays can be curved nearly twice the maximum recorded curvature for ray-finned fish fin rays during locomotion. These fin rays are curved into the direction of motion, indicating that the knifefish has active control of the fin ray curvature, and that this curvature is not the result of passive bending due to fluid loading. The forward movement is determined exclusively by the ribbon-fin and the contribution of the pectoral fins for forward movement was negligible. The body is kept relatively rigid and there is very little motion of the center of mass motion during locomotion compared to the body size of the fish.

Different wave patterns produced along the length of the elongated anal fin allow for various forms of thrust. The wave motion of the fin resembles traveling sinusoidal waves. A forward traveling wave can be associated with forward motion, while a wave in the reverse direction produces thrust in the opposite direction. This undulating motion of the fin produced a system of linked vortex-tubes that were produced along the bottom edge of the fin. A jet was produced at an angle to the fin that was directly related to the vortex tubes, and this jet provides propulsion that moves the fish forward. The wave motion of the fin is similar to that of other marine creatures, such as the undulation of the body of an eel, however the wake vortex produced by the knifefish was found to be a reverse Kármán vortex. This type of vortex is also produced by some fish, such as trout, through the oscillations of their caudal fins. The speed at which the fish moved through the water had no correlation to the amplitude of its undulations, however it was directly related to the frequency of the waves generated.

Studies have shown that the natural angle between the body of the knifefish and its fin is essential for efficient forward motion, for if the anal fin was located directly underneath, then an upwards force would be generated with forward thrust, which would require an additional downwards force in order to maintain neutral buoyancy. A combination of forward and reverse wave patterns, which meet towards the center of the anal fin, produce a heave force allowing for hovering, or upwards movement.

The ghost knifefish can vary the undulation of the waves, as well as the angle of attack of the fin to achieve various directional changes. The pectoral fins of these fishes can help to control roll and pitch control. By rolling they can generate a vertical thrust to quickly, and efficiently, ambush their prey.

=== Electroreception and electrogenesis ===
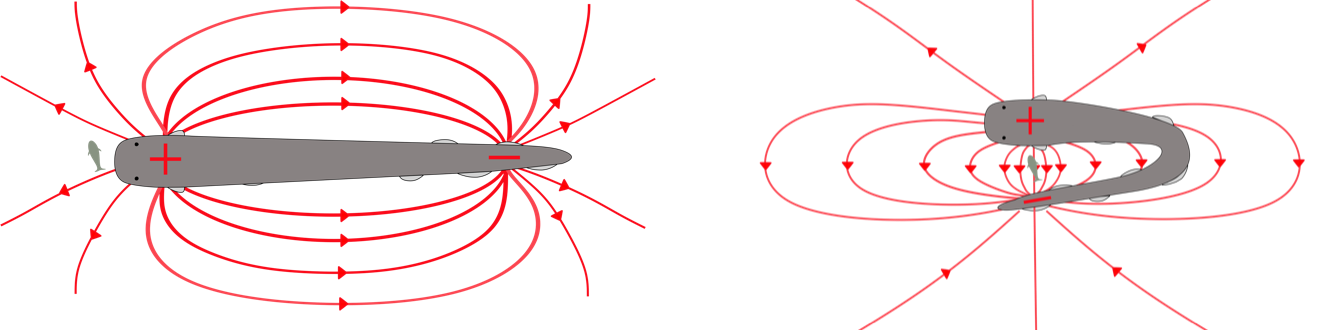
Electric fields of electric eel

These fish possess electric organs that allow them to produce electric fields, which are usually weak. In most gymnotiforms, the electric organs are derived from muscle cells. However, adult apteronotids are one exception, as theirs are derived from nerve cells (spinal electromotor neurons). In gymnotiforms, the electric organ discharge may be continuous or pulsed. The continuous discharge is generated day and night throughout the entire life of the individual. Certain aspects of the electric signal are unique to each species, especially a combination of the pulse waveform, duration, amplitude, phase, and frequency.

The electric organs of most Gymnotiformes produce tiny discharges of just a few millivolts, far too weak to cause any harm to other fish. Instead, they are used to help navigate the environment, including locating their bottom-dwelling invertebrate prey. They may also be used to send signals between fish of the same species. Electric eels can also generate low-level fields, though have the namesake capability to produce much more powerful discharges to stun prey and predators.

==== Evolution ====
The ancestor to modern-day Gymnotiformes and Siluriformes is estimated to have evolved ampullary receptors independently around 150 million years ago, allowing for passive electroreceptive capabilities. As this characteristic occurred after the prior loss of electroreception among the subclass Neopterygii after having been present in the common ancestor of vertebrates, the ampullary receptors of Gymnotiformes are not homologous with those of other jawed non-teleost species, such as the ampullae of Lorenzini in chondricthyans.

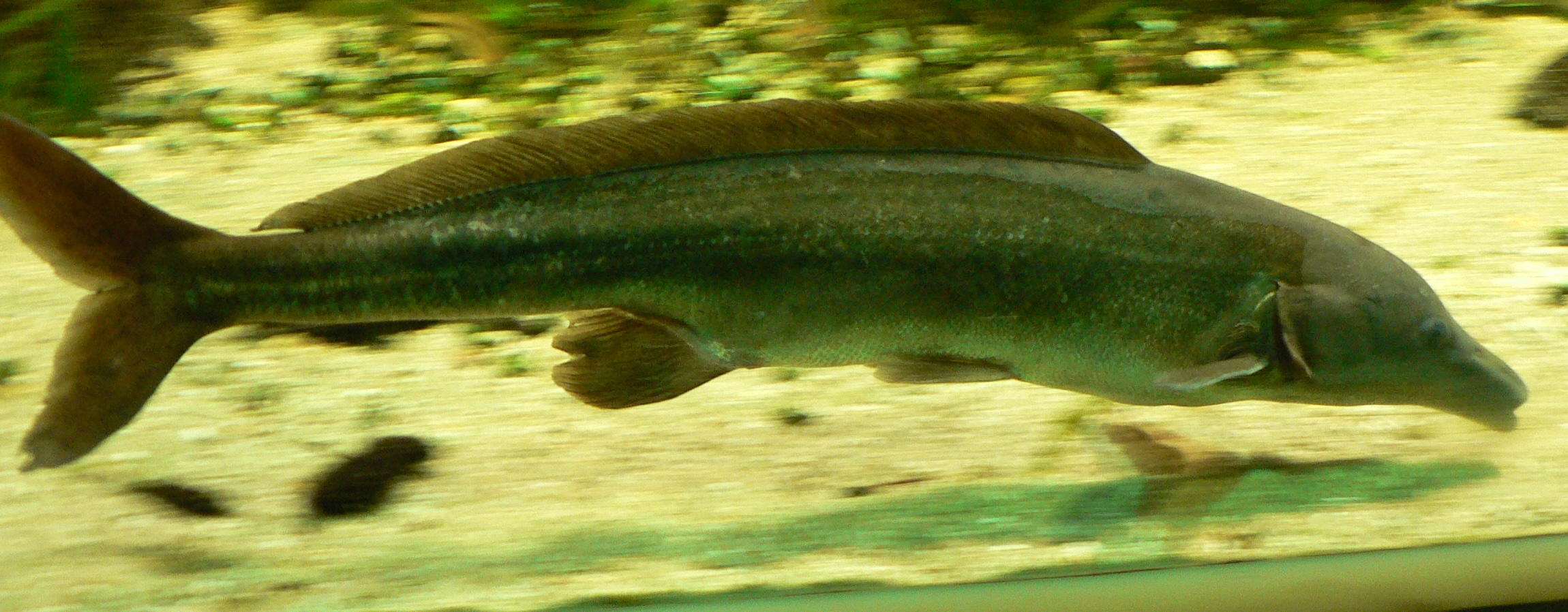
Mormyrus (and Mormyridae in general) developed their electrogenesis independently from Gymnotiformes through convergent evolution

Gymnotiformes has no extant species in Africa. This may be because they did not spread into Africa before South America and Africa split, or it may be that they were out-competed by Mormyridae, which are similar in that they also use electrolocation. Gymnotiformes and Mormyridae have developed their electric organs and electrosensory systems (ESSs) through convergent evolution. As Arnegard et al. (2005) and Albert and Crampton (2005) show, their last common ancestor was roughly 140 to 208 Mya, and at this time they did not possess ESSs. Each species of Mormyrus (family: Mormyridae) and Gymnotus (family: Gymnotidae) have evolved a unique waveform that allows the individual fish to identify between species, genders, individuals and even between mates with better fitness levels. The differences include the direction of the initial phase of the wave (positive or negative, which correlates to the direction of the current through the electrocytes in the electric organ), the amplitude of the wave, the frequency of the wave, and the number of phases of the wave.

One significant force driving the evolution of this trait is predation. The most common predators of Gymnotiformes include the closely related Siluriformes (catfish), as well as predation within families (E. electricus is one of the largest predators of Gymnotus). These predators sense electric fields, but only at low frequencies, thus certain species of Gymnotiformes, such as those in Gymnotus, have shifted the frequency of their signals so they can be effectively invisible.

Sexual selection is another driving force with an unusual influence, in that females exhibit preference for males with low-frequency signals (which are more easily detected by predators), but most males exhibit this frequency only intermittently. Females prefer males with low-frequency signals because they indicate a higher fitness of the male; as these low-frequency signals are more conspicuous to predators, the emitting of such signals by males shows that they are capable of evading predation. Therefore, the production of low-frequency signals is under competing evolutionary forces: it is selected against due to the eavesdropping of electric predators, but is favored by sexual selection due to its attractiveness to females. Females also prefer males with longer pulses, which are energetically expensive, and large tail lengths. These signs indicate their ability to exploit resources, thus indicating better lifetime reproductive success.

Genetic drift is also a factor contributing to the diversity of electric signals observed in Gymnotiformes. Reduced gene flow due to geographical barriers has led to vast differences signal morphology in different streams and drainages.

== Distribution and habitat ==
Gymnotiform fishes inhabit freshwater rivers and streams throughout the humid Neotropics, ranging from southern Mexico to northern Argentina. They are nocturnal fishes. The families Gymnotidae and Hypopomidae are most diverse (numbers of species) and abundant (numbers of individuals) in small non-floodplain streams and rivers, and in floodplain "floating meadows" of aquatic macrophytes (e.g., Pontederia, the Amazonian water hyacinth). On the other hand, families Apteronotidae and Sternopygidae are most diverse and abundant in large rivers. Species of Rhamphichthyidae are moderately diverse in all these habitat types.

== Taxonomy ==
Gymnotiformes are among the more derived members of Ostariophysi, a lineage of primary freshwater fishes. The only known fossils are from the Miocene of Bolivia, about 7 Mya.

There are currently about 250 valid gymnotiform species in 34 genera and five families, with a number of additional species yet to be formally described. The actual number of species in the wild is unknown. Gymnotiformes was hypothesized to be the sister group to the catfishes; however, this is not supported by most genetic data, which instead indicate Gymnotiformes are most closely related to a group including both catfishes and characins.

In 2026, a phylogenetic study identified two clear divisions within the Gymnotiformes, which were both described as their own suborders, Sinusoidei and Pulseoidei. Uniquely, these two genetic groupings could also be distinguished by the shape of the electric waves produced, hence their names: genera of the suborder Sinusoidei produced a sinus-type wave, while genera of the suborder Pulseoidei produced a pulse-type wave.

The following taxonomy is based on Eschmeyer's Catalog of Fishes (2026):

Order Gymnotiformes

- Suborder Sinusoidei Janzen et al, 2026
  - Family Apteronotidae D. S. Jordan, 1923 (Ghost knifefishes)
    - Subfamily Sternarchorhamphinae Albert, 2001
    - Subfamily Apteronotinae D. S. Jordan, 1923
  - Family Sternopygidae Cope, 1871 (glass knifefishes)
    - Subfamily Sternopyginae Cope, 1871
    - Subfamily Eigenmanniinae Mago-Leccia, 1978
- Suborder Pulseoidei Janzen et al, 2026
  - Family Electrophoridae Gill, 1872 (electric eels)
  - Family Gymnotidae Rafinesque, 1815
  - Family Hypopomidae C. H. Eigenmann, 1912 (bluntnose knifefishes)
  - Family Rhamphichthyidae Regan, 1911
    - Subfamily Rhamphichthyinae Regan, 1911 (sand knifefishes)
    - Subfamily Steatoginae Albert, 2001

=== Phylogeny ===
The relationships of Gymnotiformes were analysed by sequencing their mitochondrial genomes in 2019. This shows that contrary to earlier ideas, the Apteronotidae and Sternopygidae are not sister taxa, and that the Gymnotidae are deeply nested among the other families.

Actively electrolocating fish are marked on the following cladogram with a small yellow lightning flash. Fish able to deliver electric shocks are marked with a red lightning flash. Other more distantly-related electric fishes are not shown.

- Otophysi
  - Characoidei (piranhas, tetras, and allies)
  - - Gymnotiformes
      - Apteronotidae (ghost knifefishes)
      - - - Rhamphichthyoidea
            - Hypopomidae (bluntnose knifefishes)
            - Rhamphichthyidae (sand knifefishes)
          - Gymnotidae
            - Gymnotus (banded knifefishes)
            - Electrophorus (electric eels)
        - Sternopygidae (glass knifefishes)
    - Siluriformes (catfish) (Malapteruridae)

The following cladogram is based on the 2026 phylogenetic study which analyzed nine genes from 31 of 36 recognized genera of Gymnotiformes:

- Gymnotiformes
  - Sinusoidei
    - Apteronotidae
    - Sternopygidae
  - Pulsoidei
    - - Hypopomidae
      - Rhamphichthyidae
    - - Gymnotidae
        Gymnotus
      - Electrophoridae
        Electrophorus
