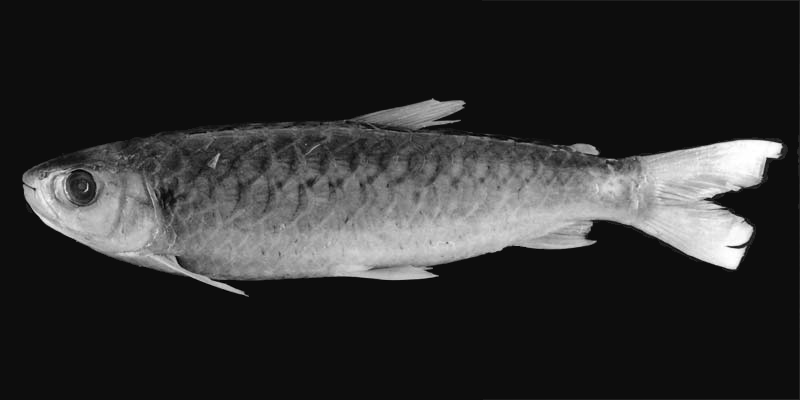
- Chalceus spilogyros holotype

Conservation status
- Least Concern (IUCN 3.1)

Scientific classification
- Kingdom: Animalia
- Phylum: Chordata
- Class: Actinopterygii
- Order: Characiformes
- Family: Chalceidae
- Genus: Chalceus
- Species: C. spilogyros

Binomial name
- Chalceus spilogyros Zanata & Toledo-Piza, 2004

= Chalceus spilogyros =

Species of fish

Chalceus spilogyros, sometimes misspelled as Chalceus spilogyrus, is a species of freshwater fish in the family Chalceidae that inhabits northern South America. It is a relatively new member of the genus Chalceus, along with C. epakros and C. guaporensis.

== Description ==
Chalceus spilogyros bears many visual similarities to other Chalceus species, including metallic scales and a vividly-colored caudal fin (usually red or pink); the rest of its fins are hyaline. Its scales also bear a reticulate (net-like) pattern, which is often uniform across the whole body. It has a comparatively rounded snout, and lacks the thin lateral stripe of C. guaporensis and C. epakros, but it bears a small-yet-distinct humeral patch (a patch above each of the pectoral fins) to differentiate it from C. macrolepidotus and C. erythrurus. Its hyaline fins further separate it from C. erythrurus, whose pelvic fins are bright yellow.

C. erythrurus may bear a humeral spot somewhat similar to that of C. spilogyros, but it is less conspicuous, and also has a notch on the upper side. C. spilogyros may have a lateral stripe on some occasions (likely relating to the mating cycle), but it is much broader and less distinct than those of C. epakros and C. guaporensis. C. spilogyros also has a fontanel (soft, membranous spot) between the frontal and parietal bones of the head to further differentiate it from C. epakros and C. guaporensis, which have none.

The longest documented C. spilogyros specimen was 22.3 cm (8.8 in) SL. This makes it one of the larger species of the genus Chalceus, competing with C. erythrurus (21.4 cm (8.4 in) SL) and outsized only by C. macrolepidotus (24.5 cm (9.6 in) SL). In specimens more than 12 cm (4.7 in) in length, the head is more robust in comparison to the body, suggesting that this size may be the point of some kind of maturation.

== Etymology ==
The specific name spilogyros is Greek in origin. "Spilos" means "spot", and "gyros" means "circle" or "round", in reference to the distinct and un-notched humeral spot. As of 2022, it has no widely accepted common name.

The genus name Chalceus comes from the Greek word "chalkos", which means "copper". Georges Cuvier, who originally described the genus, named it so because he observed that the original specimen's scales were copper-colored ("sometimes golden") when preserved in alcohol. This is an observation replicated by modern researchers.

== Taxonomy ==
Chalceus spilogyros is a modern addition to the genus Chalceus, named by Angela M. Zanata and Mônica Toledo-Piza in 2004. the same redescription of Chalceus also resulted in the recognition of C. spilogyros' congeners C. epakros and C. guaporensis. While C. epakros and C. guaporensis form a clade of their own, C. spilogyros shares a clade with the other two recognized species in the genus - the pinktail chalceus, C. macrolepidotus, and the tucan fish or yellowfin chalceus, C. erythrurus. C. macrolepidotus is the type species of the genus.

== Habitat ==
Chalceus spilogyros lives in rivers spanning northern South America, like the other Chalceus species. It largely inhabits the Trompetas, Tapajós, and Madeira rivers, occurring in the lower drainages of the latter two. This puts it as an inhabitant of inland wetland areas. C. guaporensis is also known to occur in the Madeira river.

As of 2022, C. spilogyros is considered a species of least concern by the International Union for the Conservation of Nature (IUCN).

== Diet and behavior ==
Chalceus spilogyros' diet and behavior have not been the subject of intensive study on their own. Other members of the genus have been observed to largely be insectivores, taking occasional plant material as well. The study of behavior is much the same; the pinktail and yellowfin chalceus in particular have been observed to be active, fast-moving, and somewhat skittish.
