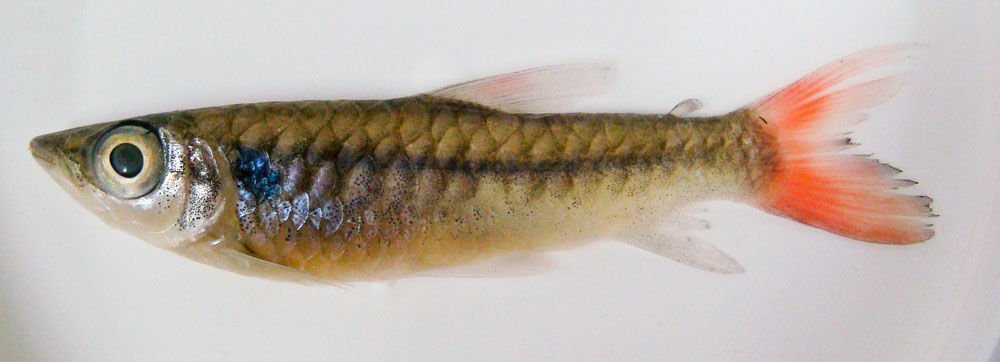

Conservation status
- Least Concern (IUCN 3.1)

Scientific classification
- Kingdom: Animalia
- Phylum: Chordata
- Class: Actinopterygii
- Order: Characiformes
- Family: Chalceidae
- Genus: Chalceus
- Species: C. guaporensis

Binomial name
- Chalceus guaporensis Zanata & Toledo-Piza, 2004

= Chalceus guaporensis =

Species of fish

Chalceus guaporensis is a species of freshwater fish belonging to the family Chalceidae that inhabits northern South America. Alongside C. epakros and C. spilogyros, it was added to the genus Chalceus in 2004.

== Description ==
Visually, C. guaporensis is similar to other Chalceus species, with metallic scales and a vivid caudal fin (often reddish or pinkish). It is also within the average size range of the genus, reaching 17.4 cm SL. It has a darker stripe down each side that reaches the caudal peduncle; C. guaporensis and C. epakros are the only two members of the genus Chalceus to sport this lateral stripe, differentiating them from the other three. C. guaporensis also usually has humeral spots (a dark spot above each pectoral fin), but they are not as well-defined as those in C. spilogyros or C. epakros. C. guaporensis and C. epakros share a more elongated and pointed snout than other Chalceus species, but it is more pronounced in C. epakros.

Chalceus guaporensis and C. epakros also both lack a fontanel (soft, membranous spot) between the parietal and frontal bones of the head. However, C. guaporensis has seven pelvic fin rays, as opposed to eight in other Chalceus species, which is the most certain method of visual identification.

== Etymology ==
The specific name guaporensis is from the Guaporé River in Bolivia, one of C. guaporensis's habitats, with the Latin suffix -ensis denoting a place of origin; compare Lynx canadensis, the Canada lynx, or Sotalia guianensis, the Guiana dolphin. It is the only member of the genus Chalceus to be named after a location.

The genus name Chalceus comes from the Greek word chalkos, which means "copper". This in turn is from the original description of the first Chalceus species, the pinktail chalceus (C. macrolepidotus), wherein Georges Cuvier noted that its scales were coppery ("sometimes golden") when preserved in alcohol.

== Taxonomy ==
Chalceus guaporensis was named in 2004 by Brazilian biologists Mônica Toledo-Piza and Angela M. Zanata. In the same revision of the genus Chalceus, its congeners C. epakros and C. spilogyros were also named. In 2005, C. guaporensis and C. epakros were determined to make up a single clade.

There are five accepted species of Chalceus; the other two are the pinktail chalceus (C. macrolepidotus) and the yellowfin chalceus (C. erythrurus). The former of these is the type species of Chalceus.

== Habitat ==
Like the rest of the genus Chalceus, C. guaporensis lives in northern South America. It gets its scientific name because it lives in the Guaporé River in Bolivia, but it also lives in the Madre de Dios River in Peru and the Madeira River in Brazil. It is considered endemic to these areas. The only other Chalceus species to occur in the Guaporé River is the pinktail.

Despite many similarities and a close genetic relationship to C. epakros, the habitat of C. guaporensis is more restricted, and the two are not found in the same places. This is thought to either be due to competition between the species, or due to slightly different environmental needs. In contrast to how limited C. guaporensis is concerning where it lives, C. epakros is the most widespread member of the genus Chalceus.

== Diet and behavior ==
Chalceus guaporensis is largely a myrmecophagous insectivore, targeting ants and the aquatic larvae of moths and butterflies (Lepidoptera), though it also eats beetles, crickets, and some plant material.
