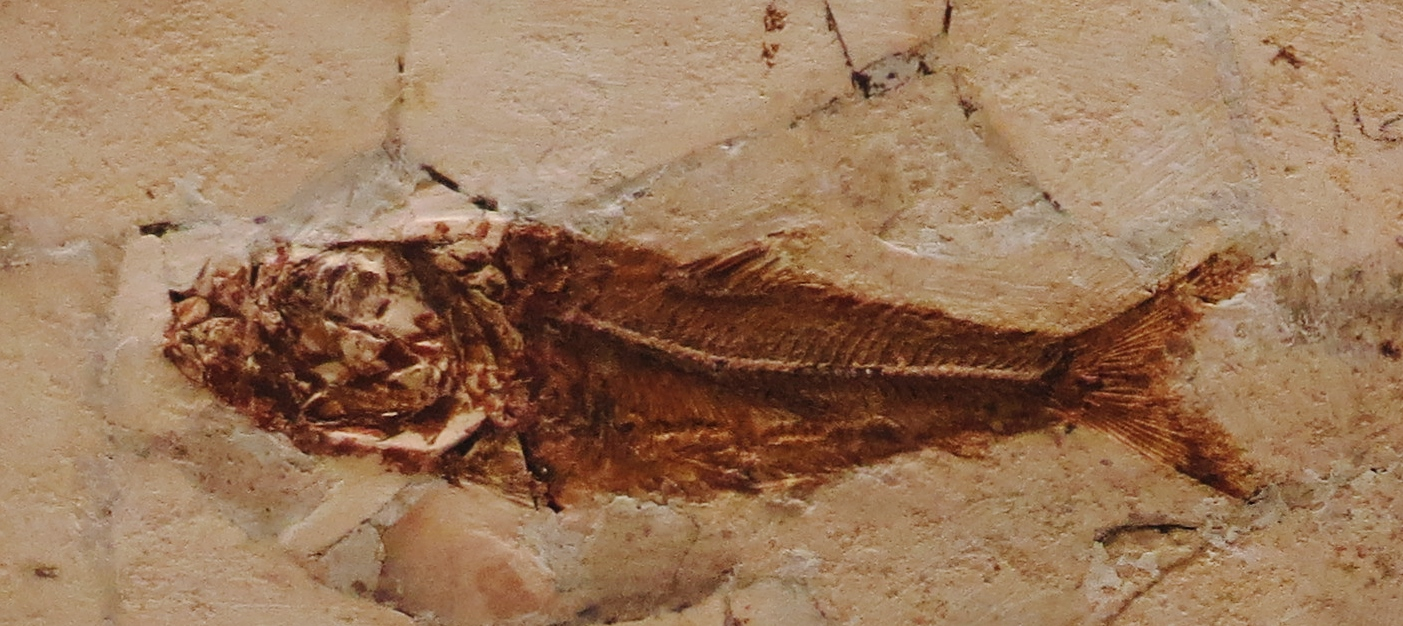
- Specimen of C. macropoma at Museo di storia naturale di Verona

Scientific classification
- Kingdom: Animalia
- Phylum: Chordata
- Class: Actinopterygii
- (unranked): Otophysi
- Family: †Chanoididae; Taverne, 2005
- Genus: †Chanoides; Woodward, 1901
- Species: †C. macropoma

Binomial name
- †Chanoides macropoma (Agassiz, 1835)

Synonyms
- Clupea macropoma Agassiz, 1835; Clupea muraenoides de Blainville, 1818 (nomen oblitum)

= Chanoides =

Chanoides Temporal range: Early Eocene

Chanoides ("similar to Chanos") is an extinct genus of marine stem-otophysan ray-finned fish from the Eocene of Europe. It contains a single species, C. macropoma from the Early Eocene-aged Monte Bolca site of Italy. It is the only known member of the family Chanoididae.

Due to its unique taxonomic placement as a basal otophysan, one of the most diverse of modern fish groups, Colin Patterson referred to Chanoides as having "the same importance [among otophysans] as Archaeopteryx among birds or Morganucodon among mammals".

== Taxonomy ==
Specimens now known to belong to this species were initially figured in 1796 by Giovanni Serafino Volta, who inaccurately identified them as belonging to a number of modern taxa (Clupea thrissa, Clupea cyprinoides, Salmo maraena & Clupea sinensis). In 1818, Henri de Blainville identified these as representing a distinct species, which he described as a herring in the genus Clupea, Clupea muraenoides. In 1835, Louis Agassiz, overlooking Blainville's description, also described the species as Clupea macropoma, the name retained in future classifications. In 1901, Arthur Smith Woodward described C. macropoma it in its own genus Chanoides as a bonefish, and a number of later authorities considered it a relative of the milkfish. In 1984, Patterson determined Chanoides to be a late-surviving genus of basal otophysan sister to all extant members of the group, a classification followed to this day. Patterson also noted Agassiz's mistake in overriding de Blainville's name, but as C. muraenoides had not been used in over a century, it was declared a nomen oblitum.

Several other species have been previously placed in Chanoides, but have since been reclassified. The species C. leptostea, previously described as a species of Chanoides, is now known to be a relative of the milkfish and placed in its own genus Coelogaster. The Oligocene C. striata was reclassified into its own genus, Neohalecopsis, shortly after description and is also thought to be a milkfish relative. C. chardoni, a Late Cretaceous fish that resembles Chanoides and was initially described as a Cretaceous species of it, was moved to its own genus Nardonoides in 2014, and found to have several traits not shared by Chanoides or any extant otophysan, and thus reclassified as a non-otophysan ostariophysan. Another Cretaceous species, C. weberi Taverne & Cosmo, 2008, was found to be too poorly-preserved to assign to Chanoides or even the Otophysi, and is considered a nomen dubium.

== Description ==
Scans of Chanoides have identified a developed Weberian apparatus, confirming its relationship to other otophysans, although it strongly differs from all extant otophysans in its anatomy, confirming its placement in an extinct lineage. Aside from this, the most unique anatomical feature of Chanoides is the "extramaxilla", a paired cartilage bone that fit on the joint between the premaxilla and maxilla, which may have helped to transmit movements between the two bones during jaw protrusion. Aside from potentially Nardonoides, in which it appears to also be present, the extramaxillary bone is not known from any other fish, extant or extinct.
