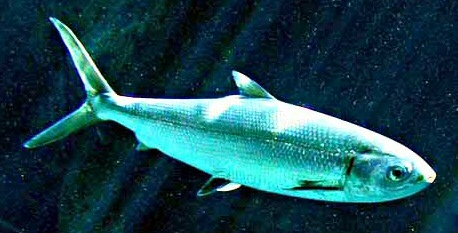
- Milkfish, Chanos chanos

Scientific classification
- Kingdom: Animalia
- Phylum: Chordata
- Class: Actinopterygii
- Division: Teleostei
- Cohort: Otocephala
- Superorder: Ostariophysi; Sagemehl, 1885

Orders with number of species
- Gonorynchiformes 37; Cypriniformes 4,501; Characiformes 2,168; Gymnotiformes 239; Siluriformes 3,813

= Ostariophysi =

Ostariophysi Temporal range: Early Cretaceous–Recent

Superorder of fishes

Ostariophysi is the second-largest superorder of fish. Members of this superorder are called ostariophysians. This diverse group contains 10,758 species, about 28% of known fish species in the world and 68% of freshwater species, and are present on all continents except Antarctica. They have a number of common characteristics such as an alarm substance and a Weberian apparatus. Members of this group include fish important to people for food, sport, the aquarium industry, and research.

== Description ==
Most species possess a swim bladder (except in Gonorynchus). The swim bladder is usually divided into two chambers. A smaller anterior chamber is partially or completely covered by a silvery peritoneal tunic. A larger posterior chamber may be reduced or absent in some groups. Minute, unicellular, horny projections known as "unculi" are commonly present on various body parts and are only known from ostariophysians.

Many ostariophysians have the characteristic of an alarm substance that is part of a fright reaction. This is a pheromone produced in epidermal club cells, and is similar or identical in all ostariophysians. When the fish is injured, this pheromone is released; other fish of the same species or similar species can smell this pheromone, causing a fright reaction. However, some fish possess the alarm substance without the fright reaction or lack both the alarm substance and the fright reaction to the alarm substance.

=== Weberian apparatus ===
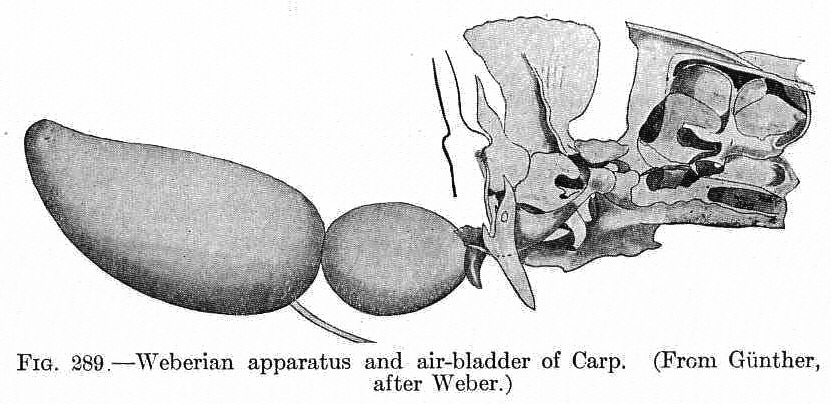
Weberian apparatus and swim-bladder of a carp

In otophysians, one of the main characteristics is the Weberian apparatus. It is made up of a set of bones known as Weberian ossicles, a chain of small bones that connect the auditory system to the swim bladder of fishes. The ossicles connect the swim bladder wall with Y-shaped lymph sinus that abuts the lymph-filled transverse canal joining the sacculi of the right and left ears. This allows the transmission of vibrations to the inner ear.

In anotophysians, the three first vertebrae are specialized and associated with one or more cephalic ribs (a primitive Weberian apparatus). In the otophysians, a distinct modification of the anterior four or five first vertebrae is found, as well as the Weberian ossicles.

The fully functioning Weberian apparatus consists of the swim bladder, the Weberian ossicles, a portion of the anterior vertebral column, and some muscles and ligaments. It is named after the German anatomist and physiologist Ernst Heinrich Weber who first described the Weberian ossicles.

=== Diversity ===
Ostariophysi is the second largest superorder of teleosts. It includes five major lineages and is a very diverse group. As of 2006 (Nelson), the five orders contain 1,075 genera in 64 families and about 7,931 species, which is about 28% of all known fish species. The four largest families in this group (Cyprinidae, Characidae, Loricariidae, and Balitoridae) include 4,656 species, over half (59%) of ostariophysian species. The carp and minnow family Cyprinidae itself is the largest freshwater fish family and the largest family of vertebrates after the true gobies of Gobiidae. Ostariophysians account for about 68% of all freshwater species; in fact, there are only about 123 marine species (Chanidae, Gonorynchidae, most Ariidae, about half of Plotosidae). They are present on all continents and major land masses except Antarctica, Greenland, and New Zealand.

This group includes a wide variety of different fishes in a plethora of niches. It contains one of the largest freshwater fish ever caught, the Mekong giant catfish, which can weigh up to about 300 kilograms (660 lb). It also contains a number of species considered to be some of the smallest vertebrates extant; Danionella translucida at 12 millimetres (0.47 in) in length, and Paedocypris progenetica at 10.3 millimetres (0.41 in). Some of these fish are able to breathe atmospheric oxygen when in hypoxic waters (Clariidae), which may allow them to live outside of the water column entirely (Phreatobius cisternarum and Tarumania walkerae). The families Malapteruridae and Gymnotidae have the ability to produce strong electric charges; they are considered among the prototypical electric fishes.

== Taxonomy ==
The superorder is divided into two series, Anotophysi and Otophysi. However, in older literature, Ostariophysi was restricted only to the fish that are currently classified under Otophysi. Otophysi was coined in 1970 by Rosen and Greenwood to separate the traditional Ostariophysians from the added Gonorynchiformes.

The superorder is classified below:

- Series Anotophysi
  - Gonorynchiformes, about 107 species
- Series Otophysi (Euostariophysi)
  - Cypriniformes (minnows and allies), about 4,501 species (contains Cyprinidae, largest family of freshwater fishes)
  - Characiformes (characins and allies), about 2,168 species
  - Siluriformes (catfishes), about 3,813 species
  - Gymnotiformes (electric eels, American knifefishes), about 239 species (sometimes grouped under Siluriformes)

The monophyly of Ostariophysi has come into question with molecular evidence. Gonorynchiformes is more closely related to Clupeiformes than Otophysi. It is possible that the Gonorynchiformes and Clupeiformes form a monophyletic group. There is evidence for a sister group relationship between Ostariophysi and Clupeomorpha (the taxon Ostarioclupeomorpha, also known as Otocephala, was coined to describe this possibly monophyletic group).

Characiphysae or Characiphysi is a superorder originally defined as encompassing all otophysan orders apart from Cypriniformes; resources such as the National Center for Biotechnology Information (NCBI) continue using this treatment, though some researchers prefer to treat it as monotypic, containing just Characiformes.

The following primitive fossil ostariophysans are known:

- Superorder Ostariophysi
  - Genus †Ancylostylos Gorjanović-Kramberger, 1895 [scale]
  - Genus †Erythrinolepis Cockerell, 1919 [scale]
  - Genus †Nardonoides Mayrinck, Brito & Otero, 2013 (Santonian of Italy)
  - Genus †Sorbininardus Taverne, 1999 (Santonian of Italy)
  - Series Otophysi
    - Genus †Acronichthys Liu et al., 2025 (Late Cretaceous of the western United States and Canada)
    - Genus †Chanoides Woodward, 1901 (Early Eocene of Italy)
    - Genus †Santanichthys Silva Santos, 1991 (Albian of Brazil)
    - Genus †Sooinichthys Alvarado-Ortega, Otero & Mayrinck, 2025 (Albian of Mexico)
    - Family †Clupavidae Bertin & Arambourg, 1958
      - Genus †Clupavus Arambourg, 1950 (Aptian to Turonian of worldwide)
      - Genus †Lusitanichthys Cavin, 1999 (Cenomanian of Morocco)

== Evolution ==
Ostariophysian fossils, both anotophysan and otophysian, are known from the early Cretaceous. Ostariophysian fossils are known from every continent except Australia.

Ostariophysians are currently distributed worldwide on all continents except Antarctica. The common ancestor of this group entered fresh water about 251 million years ago coincident with the global decrease in oxygen levels in marine waters. The Otophysi originated in freshwaters during the Jurassic (c. 200–145 Ma) before the breakup of the super continent Pangea. The division of the Otophysi into the four extant clades closely follows the breakup of Pangea. The separation of Laurasia in the north from Gondwana in the south isolated the lineages which gave rise to the modern Cypriniformes and Characiphysi. The Characiphysi then was itself divided into the diurnal (day-active) Characiformes and the nocturnal (night-active) Siluriphysi, including Siluriformes and Gymnotiformes. Modern Characiformes are present in both South America and Africa, and have relatively recently extended their range to North America. The Siluriphysi are characterized by many derived traits, including notably, electroreception. The Siluriphysi originated before the breakup of Gondwana into South America and Africa in the Aptian (c. 110 Ma) but the presence of several basal Siluriphysan taxa in modern South America (Gymnotiformes, Diplomystidae, Loricaridea) suggest that the Siluriphysi may have originated on the western portion of Gondwana. Alternatively, these basal taxa have subsequently become extinct in Africa. The modern distribution of Siluriformes is cosmopolitan due to subsequent dispersal.
