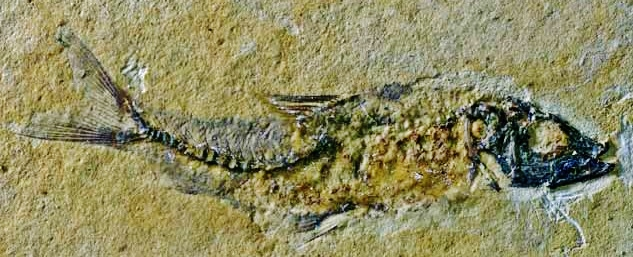
- Fossil from the Riachuelo Formation in northeast Brazil

Scientific classification
- Kingdom: Animalia
- Phylum: Chordata
- Class: Actinopterygii
- Order: Characiformes
- Genus: †Santanichthys; Silva Santos, 1991
- Species: †S. diasii

Binomial name
- †Santanichthys diasii (Silva Santos, 1958)

= Santanichthys =

Santanichthys Temporal range: Early Cretaceous, 125–112 Ma

Extinct genus of fishes

Santanichthys diasii is a species of extinct fish that existed around 115 million years ago during the Albian age. S. diasii is regarded as the basal-most characiform, and is the earliest known member of Otophysi. It appears as a small fish, similar in appearance to a modern-day herring little more than 30 millimeters in length. Its most striking characteristic is the presence of a Weberian apparatus, which makes it the most primitive known member of the order Characiformes, the order in which modern-day tetras (including piranhas) are classified. Santanichthys has been unearthed from numerous locations throughout Brazil, in rocks dating to the Cretaceous Period. Its presence in these strata is seen as an indicator for the biogeography and evolution of its order.

== Anatomy and morphology ==
Santanichthys is a small, characiform fish that would have superficially resembled more advanced tetras or the unrelated herrings. Maximum length appears to be around 3-4 centimeters standard length. The species possesses a primitive but complete Weberian Apparatus, formed from the first four vertebrae of the spinal column. This is the earliest occurrence of the structure found in any known taxon of fish. Anatomically, the fish is similar to many others within its order. The body is semi-laterally compressed and ovate. The fins are more or less complete for a characiform - Santanichthys possesses a single dorsal, anal and caudal fin and paired pectoral and pelvic fins. Skeletal-wise, the fish has from 30-40 elongated vertebrae. A complex suspensorium can be found in the taxon. Jaw teeth however, are noticeably absent. Cycloid scales are wholly present throughout the entire body.

== Range and distribution ==
Fossils of Santanichthys were first unearthed from the Romualdo Member of the Santana Formation in northeastern Brazil. The formation, situated in the hills of the Araripe Basin, is highly renowned for its rich Early Cretaceous fauna. The specific rock strata where fossils of Santanichthys were gathered from date back to the Aptian stage of the Cretaceous period. A large part of this faunal assemblage are masses of fossilized fish found at semi-regular intervals, including shoals of Santanichthys in various states of preservation. Aside from the Santana, Santanichthys fossils have also been found in other Cretaceous deposits in Brazil. The Cretaceous deposits of the Brazilian Riachuelo Formation, specifically the Taquari Member have yielded specimens of Santanichthys. Fossils of the taxon have also been unearthed from the Codo Formation in the Parnaiba Basin of Northeastern Brazil.

The type specimen, DGM-DNPM 647P was taken from Albian deposits of the Romualdo Member in the Santana Formation. It is a fossil of a complete fish, around 4 centimeters long from snout to the base of the tail. At least two dozen specimens are kept by the American Museum of Natural History as AMNH 20050-20075. Some specimens of Santanichthys were taken from the fossilized stomach contents of other, larger fish such as AMNH 19439 and AMNH 12826.

== Evolutionary history ==
Santanichthys diasii is the only species within the genus Santanichthys. It is classified in the order Characiformes, an order that includes the tetras. Analysis of its morphological characters, including the presence of enlarged lagenar capsules has placed it as one of the most basal characiforms. This, combined with the Early Cretaceous origin of these specimens, makes Santanichthys the earliest known otophysan; The next characiforms up the fossil record date from the Late Cretaceous period already. This has several implications on the evolution of the Characiformes. All modern characiforms are strictly freshwater species. The Santana Formation is a marine sedimentary formation and thus Santanichthys was most likely an inhabitant of brackish or marine waters. This supports a marine-to-freshwater model of the evolution and dispersal of characiform species from the breakup of the continent Gondwana (Africa and South America) to the present day.

== Taxonomic history ==
Santanichthys diasii was first described within the genus Leptolepis as Leptolepis diasii in 1958. The specimens, fossilized fish from the Santana Formation no more than thirty centimeters long apiece, were simply described as "prehistoric teleosts" and not much anatomical comparison was done between the specimens and other previously-known prehistoric fish. The second Leptolepis species described at the time of discovery, L. diasii found itself orphaned when the type species for the genus, L. bahiaensis was re-examined and reclassified in a different genus. L. diasii was deemed to be too different and anatomically advanced than others in the genus, and was rotated out of the genus in a 1991 classification by Maisey. The species' current genus, Santanichthys was coined in the same year when the species was redescribed by its original describer. Because of several perceived anatomical structures, it was reclassified within the Clupeomorpha. Subsequent analyses of available Santanichthys fossil material have determined some structures to be akin to a primitive Weberian Apparatus, prompting reclassification of the taxon as a basal otophysan and within the Characiformes.
