= SZA (disambiguation) =

SZA (born Solána Imani Rowe; 1989) is an American R&B singer.

SZA or Sza may also refer to:

- Schizoaffective disorder, a psychiatric diagnosis with symptoms of a mood disorder and schizophrenia
- Solar zenith angle, in astronomy and earth science
- Soyo Airport, in Angola (IATA airport code SZA)
- Sunyaev–Zel'dovich Array, an array of telescopes
- sza, the ISO 639 code for the Semelai language in peninsular Malaysia
- SZA, the acronym for "USA" in Polish (Stany Zjednoczone Ameryki)
- sza, the Polish transliteration for Sha (Cyrillic) (Ш), a letter of the Cyrillic script

== See also ==
- Scissor (disambiguation)
