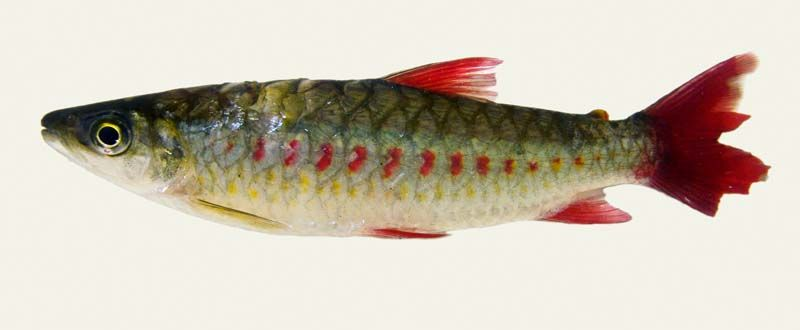

Conservation status
- Least Concern (IUCN 3.1)

Scientific classification
- Kingdom: Animalia
- Phylum: Chordata
- Class: Actinopterygii
- Order: Characiformes
- Family: Chalceidae
- Genus: Chalceus
- Species: C. epakros

Binomial name
- Chalceus epakros Zanata & Toledo-Piza, 2004

= Chalceus epakros =

Species of fish

Chalceus epakros is a species of freshwater ray-finned fish belonging to the family Chalceidae, the tucan fishes. This fish is found in northern South America. This species was described in 2004, alongside the species C. guaporensis and C. spilogyros.

== Description ==
Chalceus epakros bears visual similarities to other members of the genus Chalceus, like metallic scales and a vivid red or pink caudal fin, though several differences help separate it from its congeners. It has a thin stripe laterally that reaches the caudal peduncle, as well as a longer and more pointed snout. It may occasionally bear humeral spots (a spot above each pectoral fin), but they are rather indistinct, especially compared to the humeral spots of C. spilogyros. Its fins are a mixture of hyaline and reddish-pink, as opposed to the bright-yellow pelvic fins of C. erythrurus.

Chalceus erythrurus and C. macrolepidotus may occasionally bear a similar lateral stripe to C. epakros, but theirs are broader and more indistinct. This is hypothesized to be related to mating habits, and may be more prominent around mating season. C. epakros' stripe is composed of chromatophores closer to the surface than that of C. erythrurus and others.

Chalceus epakros is incredibly visually similar to C. guaporensis, including a thin lateral stripe, a pointed snout, and the occasional indistinct humeral patch. C. epakros and C. guaporensis are also alike in that they lack a fontanel (soft, membranous spot) on the head, while the other three species have one between the frontal and parietal bone. However, C. guaporensis is slightly larger, and it has 7 pelvic fin rays as opposed to eight on C. epakros. C. epakros is the smallest Chalceus species, reaching 17.4 cm TL (with the caudal fin included); C. guaporensis reaches that same length in SL (without the caudal fin).

== Etymology ==
The specific name epakros is from Greek, and means "pointed at the end", in reference to the longer and more pointed snout; compare Cryptocentrus epakros, the pointedfin shrimpgoby.

The genus name Chalceus comes from "chalkos", which is the Greek word for "copper". French biologist Georges Cuvier, who named the first member of Chalceus (C. macrolepidotus), named it this because the preserved specimen's scales were copper-colored ("sometimes golden") when preserved in alcohol, though its scales are silvery in life.

== Taxonomy ==
In 2004, Brazilian biologists Mônica Toledo-Piza and Angela M. Zanata performed a re-examination of the genus Chalceus, resulting in the nomination of not only C. epakros but its congeners C. guaporensis and C. spilogyros. Upon study in 2005, C. epakros and C. guaporensis were determined to form a clade, accounting for their visual similarities, while C. spilogyros, C. erythrurus, and C. macrolepidotus share another.

Previously, specimens of C. epakros had been misidentified as specimens of C. macrolepidotus and C. erythrurus; C. macrolepidotus (Cuvier) and C. erythrurus (Cope) are long-established members of the genus, having been named in 1818 and 1870, respectively.

== Habitat ==
Like the rest of its genus, C. epakros is a freshwater fish from northern South America. C. epakros has the widest distribution of all Chalceus species, inhabiting the Amazon basin, the Orinoco river, and the Essequibo river. Despite sharing a clade, C. epakros and C. guaporensis are not found in the same areas; this could either be due to competition between the species, or due to slight differences in environmental needs.

Chalceus epakros and C. macrolepidotus are the only two Chalceus species known to occur in Guyana.

== Diet and behavior ==
Chalceus epakros seems to largely be an insectivore, targeting ants and wasps. In one study (Torrente-Vilara et al.), very few examined specimens had food material in their stomachs, making diet-mapping difficult. This lines up with other, more thoroughly-studied Chalceus species, which target similar invertebrate spreads.

Behaviorally, C. epakros is lacking in data. Other members of the genus are active, fast-moving, and somewhat skittish.
