= Leptobrycon =

Conservation status
- Least Concern (IUCN 3.1)

Scientific classification
- Kingdom: Animalia
- Phylum: Chordata
- Class: Actinopterygii
- Order: Characiformes
- Family: incertae sedis
- Genus: Leptobrycon; C. H. Eigenmann, 1915
- Species: L. jatuaranae

Binomial name
- Leptobrycon jatuaranae C. H. Eigenmann, 1915

Genus of fishes

Leptobrycon is a monospecific genus of freshwater ray-finned fish belonging to the suborder Characoidei within the order Characiformes, the characins. The only species in the genus is Leptobrycon jatuaranae, which is endemic to Brazil, where it occurs in the Amazon River basin. This taxon has not been assigned to a particular family within the Characoidei and is considered to be incertae sedis, i.e. its taxonomic affinities are, as yet, unclear. This is a small fish with a maximum length of 2.9 cm (1.1 in).
