= Dectobrycon =

Scientific classification
- Kingdom: Animalia
- Phylum: Chordata
- Class: Actinopterygii
- Order: Characiformes
- Family: incertae sedis
- Genus: Dectobrycon; Zarske & Géry, 2006
- Species: D. armeniacus

Binomial name
- Dectobrycon armeniacus Zarske & Géry, 2006

Species of fish

Dectobrycon is a monospecific genus of freshwater ray-finned fish belonging to the suborder Characoidei within the order Characiformes, the characins. The only species in the genus is Dectobrycon armeniacus, the apricot tetra. This taxon has not been assigned to a particular family within the Characoidei and is considered to be incertae sedis, i.e. its taxonomic affinities are, as yet, unclear. It was first formally described in 2006 by Axel Zarske and Jacques Géry with the type being found a specimen imported through the fish keeping trade from Peru,. donated by the German aquarium fish importation company Aquarium Glaser, D. armeniacus is found in the aquarium trade.
