= Scissors (disambiguation) =

Scissors are a tool used for cutting.

Scissor or scissors may also refer to:

== In popular culture ==
- Scissor Sisters, a pop band
- Scissors (film), a 1991 movie
- Nightmare (2000 film), a.k.a. Scissors, a 2000 South Korean horror film
- Absurda, a.k.a. Scissors, a surrealist short film directed by David Lynch
- Scissors, a manga by Takashi Hashiguchi
- Kamen Rider Scissors, character from Kamen Rider Ryuki
- Scissors, a fictional character from Rock Paper Scissors
- Scissors, an album by Blood on the Dance Floor (band)
- "Scissors", a song from Slipknot's 1999 album Slipknot
- "Scissors" (song), a 2024 song by Julia Michaels and Maren Morris

== Games ==
- Scissors (game), a party game
- Rock paper scissors, an intransitive hand game
- Scissors, the code name for Alara Reborn, a Magic: The Gathering set

== Science, engineering and aviation ==
- Scissor doors, a type of automobile door
- Scissoring (chemistry), a type of motion especially relevant to chemical bonds
- Scissors or scissors crossover or scissors crossing, a configuration of railway track
- Scissors (aeronautics), an aerial combat manoeuvre
- Scissor (fish), a genus of characid fish
- Scissors mechanism, also known as a pantograph, a type of mechanical linkage

== Sports and physical activities ==
- Scissors jump, a name for a high jump method
- Scissors, an attacking move in rugby league football, see Glossary of rugby league terms
- Scissor kick, also known as the bicycle kick, an aerial kick in association football (soccer)
- Pommel horse, a male gymnastics exercise also known as Scissors
- Tribadism, a sex act also known as scissoring
- Scissor (gladiator), a type of Ancient Rome gladiator

== Geography ==
- Scissors, Texas

== See also ==
- Koçaklı, Kozluk, Turkey; also called Zixor
- SZA, U.S. singer-songwriter
- Scizor, a Pokemon, a fictional beast
- Prince Xizor, Star Wars character
