= Thrissobrycon =

Conservation status
- Least Concern (IUCN 3.1)

Scientific classification
- Kingdom: Animalia
- Phylum: Chordata
- Class: Actinopterygii
- Order: Characiformes
- Family: incertae sedis
- Genus: Thrissobrycon; J. E. Böhlke, 1953
- Species: T. pectinifer

Binomial name
- Thrissobrycon pectinifer J. E. Böhlke, 1953

Species of fish

Thrissobrycon is a monospecific genus of freshwater ray-finned fish belonging to the suborder Characoidei within the order Characiformes, the characins. The only species in the genus is Thrissobrycon pectinifer which is endemic to Brazil. his taxon has not been assigned to a particular family within the Characoidei and is considered to be incertae sedis, i.e. its taxonomic affinities are, as yet, unclear.
