= Mixobrycon =

Conservation status
- Vulnerable (IUCN 3.1)

Scientific classification
- Kingdom: Animalia
- Phylum: Chordata
- Class: Actinopterygii
- Division: Teleostei
- Order: Characiformes
- Family: incertae sedis
- Genus: Mixobrycon; C. H. Eigenmann, 1915
- Species: M. ribeiroi

Binomial name
- Mixobrycon ribeiroi (C. H. Eigenmann, 1907)

Synonyms
- Cheirodon ribeiroi C. H. Eigenmann, 1907

Species of fish

Mixobrycon is a monospecific genus of freshwater ray-finned fish belonging to the suborder Characoidei within the order Characiformes, the characins. The only species in the genus is Mixobrycon ribeiroi, a species endemic to Paraguay, where it is found in the Paraguay River basin. This taxon has not been assigned to a particular family within the Characoidei and is considered to be incertae sedis, i.e. its taxonomic affinities are, as yet, unclear.

Named in honor of Alípio de Miranda Ribeiro (1874-1939) a Brazilian ichthyologist-herpetologist.
