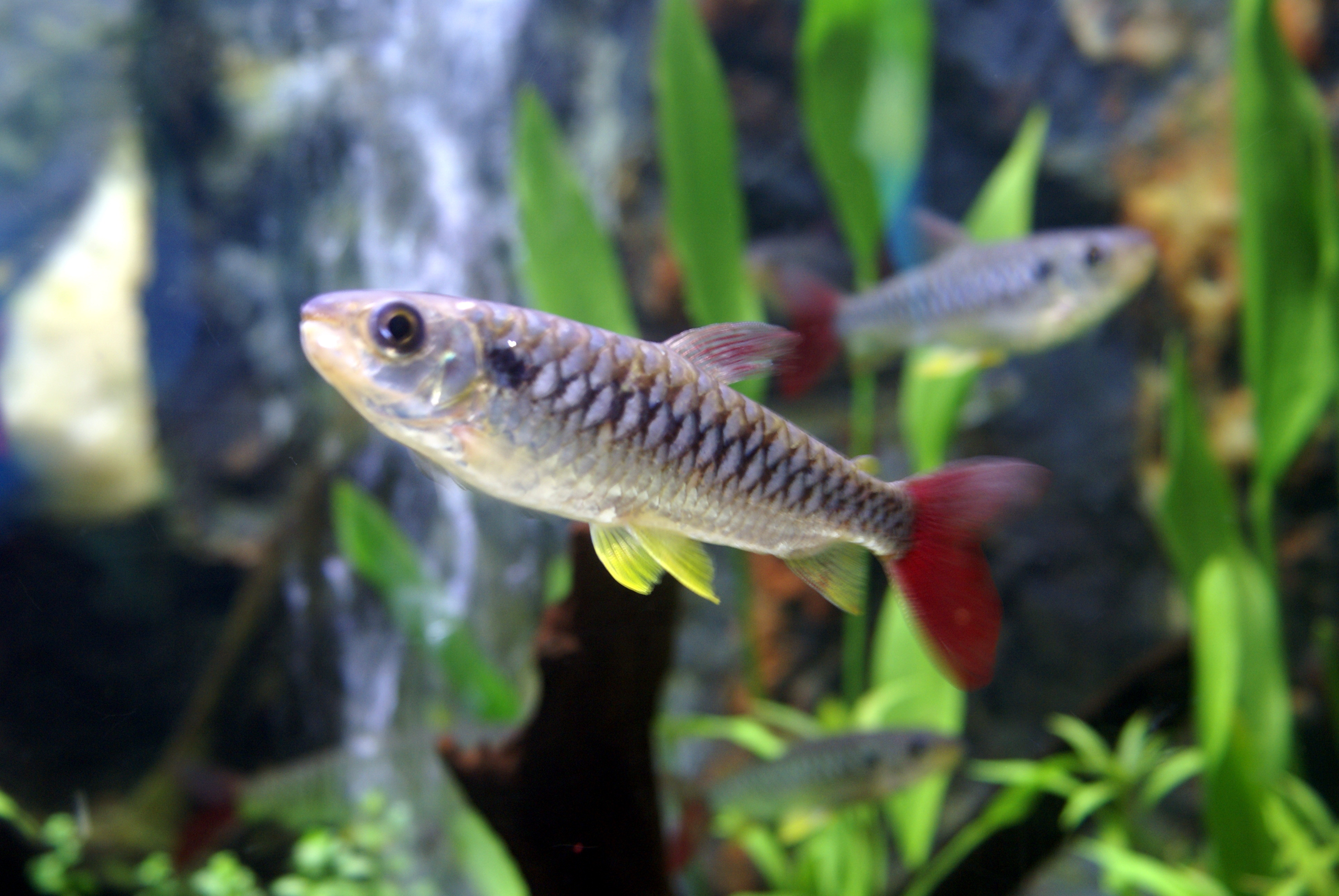
- Chalceus macrolepidotus

Scientific classification
- Kingdom: Animalia
- Phylum: Chordata
- Class: Actinopterygii
- Order: Characiformes
- Suborder: Characoidei
- Family: Chalceidae; Fowler, 1958
- Genus: Chalceus; Cuvier, 1818

Type species
- Chalceus macrolepidotus Cuvier, 1818

Synonyms
- Pellegrinina Fowler, 1907; Plethodectes Cope, 1870

= Chalceus =

Genus of fishes

Chalceus is a genus of fish that inhabits freshwater habitats in South America. Members can be found in the Amazon and Orinoco basins, as well as in the Guianas and various tributaries of the former. It is the sole representative of the family Chalceidae, the tucanfishes.

== Description ==
Members of the genus Chalceus typically reach a length of 15–25 cm (5.9–9.8 in), but may reach about 30 cm (12 in). They have an elongated shape, and relatively large scales. Their fins are a variety of colors, most commonly red, yellow, or hyaline, with a red or pink tail being the most common.

== Classification ==
Chalceus was previously classified as a member of the family Characidae, and is still listed there by some authorities (like GBIF and ITIS). However, recent phylogenetic and morphological analysis has prompted a move into the family Chalceidae, which is currently home only to the genus Chalceus (making it monotypic). This move was also done in order to keep the family Charadicae monophyletic.

== Species ==
Chalceus contains the following valid species:

- Chalceus epakros Zanata & Toledo-Piza, 2004
- Chalceus erythrurus (Cope, 1870) (tucan fish)
- Chalceus guaporensis Zanata & Toledo-Piza, 2004
- Chalceus macrolepidotus Cuvier, 1818 (pinktail chalceus)
- Chalceus spilogyros Zanata & Toledo-Piza, 2004

NB: Two species described by Jardine, C. latus and C. taeniatus, are currently species inquirenda. A third species which was described by Jardine, C. fasciatus, is regarded as a synonym but also considered to be incertae sedis.

== History ==
The genus Chalceus was established by Georges Cuvier in 1818, when he described the pinktail chalceus (C. marcolepidotus) as a new species in a new genus. By way of monotypy, the pinktail became the type species therein. The next established species was the tucan fish, C. erythrurus, which was named by Edward Drinker Cope in 1870, though he first classified it in the genus Plethodectes with the full name Plethodectes erythrurus. In 1872, he moved it to Chalceus.

A full redescription of the genus occurred in 2004, undertaken by Brazilian biologists Angela M. Zanata and Mônica Toledo-Piza, which resulted in the nomination of the other three species.

== Etymology ==
The name Chalceus is Greek in origin and comes from the word chalkos, which means "copper". This was given by Cuvier because he observed that the original specimen's scales were "sometimes golden" when preserved in alcohol.
