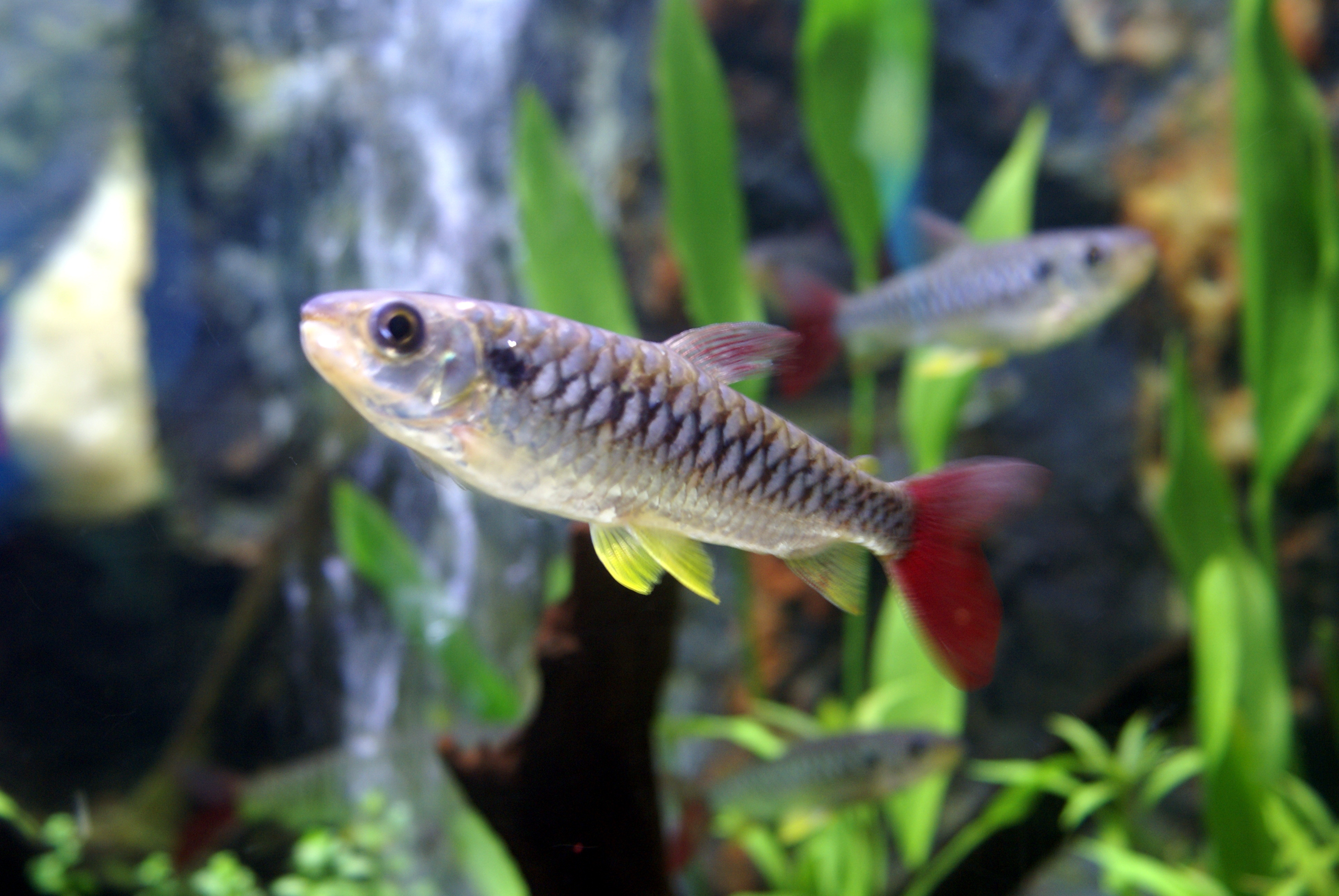

Conservation status
- Least Concern (IUCN 3.1)

Scientific classification
- Kingdom: Animalia
- Phylum: Chordata
- Class: Actinopterygii
- Division: Teleostei
- Order: Characiformes
- Family: Chalceidae
- Genus: Chalceus
- Species: C. macrolepidotus

Binomial name
- Chalceus macrolepidotus Cuvier, 1818

Synonyms
- Chalceus ararapeera Valenciennes, 1850; Creagrutus pellegrini Puyo, 1943

= Pinktail chalceus =

Species of fish

The pinktail chalceus (Chalceus macrolepidotus), also called the pinktail characin, is a species of freshwater ray-finned fish belonging to the family Chalceidae, the tucan fishes. This fish is found in South America. It is one of five fish in the genus Chalceus, and is the type species of the genus.

== Description ==
The pinktail chalceus is a small, light-colored freshwater fish with a tail that is usually dark red to pink and is much more intensely colored than the rest of the animal. It has large, noticeable scales and reaches 24.5 cm SL, making it the largest known member of Chalceus. The smallest is Chalceus epakros.

Chalceus epakros, before being classified, was regularly misidentified as either the pinktail chalceus or the yellowfin chalceus (Chalceus erythrurus). C. epakros and the pinktail can be told apart because the pinktail is uniform silvery in color, whereas C. epakros has a line down the middle of either side that reaches its caudal peduncle.

== Etymology ==
The common name "pinktail chalceus" comes from its caudal fin, which is typically much more saturated in color than the main body. The specific name macrolepidotus means "large scale" in Latin, which is considered an accurate reflection of its scale size; the scales themselves are cycloid. The original description gave it the common name "large-scaled chalceus".

The genus name Chalceus comes from the Greek word chalkos, which means brass or copper. This name was given based on the observation that the scales on the type specimen were coppery ("sometimes golden") when preserved in alcohol.

== Taxonomy ==
Upon description by French naturalist Georges Cuvier in 1818, the pinktail chalceus was placed into the new genus Chalceus. By way of monotypy, it ended up as the type species therein. Since then, several additions and retractions have occurred, as well as a redescription of the genus in the year 2004, and there are now five accepted species in total, C. macrolepidotus included.

The original scientific name given by Cuvier has remained its accepted scientific name. Synonyms include Brycon macrolepidotus, Chalceus ararapeera, Chalceus erythrurus, Pellegrina heterolepsis, and Creagrutus pellegrini. The name Chalceus erythrurus has since been assigned to a different species in the genus altogether.

The yellowfin chalceus, C. erythrurus, was briefly classified as Chalceus macrolepidotus iquitensis, a subspecies of the pinktail chalceus, by biologist Shoji Nakashima in 1941.

== Habitat ==
The pinktail chalceus is found in well-oxygenated (fast-flowing) waters in South America; specifically, it is found in French Guiana, Guyana, and Suriname, inhabiting the Orinoco and Negro Rivers. C. epakros and the pinktail are the only two Chalceus species known to occur in Guyana. It has been non-natively established in Mexico as well, though it is not considered invasive by the Global Register of Introduced and Invasive Species (GRIIS).

== Diet and behavior ==
The pinktail chalceus is a fast-moving and active fish that stays near the river's surface. It tends to cluster together in schools. Its diet generally consists of small invertebrates; when searching for food, it may leap out of the water to target a bug above the surface.

It is notably skittish. This is a trait it shares with the yellowfin chalceus.

== In aquaria ==
The pinktail chalceus is moderately popular in the aquarium trade, though it requires a larger aquarium than many prospective keepers have access to (55 gallons or above). It has enough of a reputation for jumping out of its tank (like its behavior in the wild) that sellers regularly warn buyers about it. This is more likely to happen if the pinktail is startled and does not have anyplace to take cover, such as plants or driftwood hideaways.

Aquarists with adequate space to keep pinktails are advised to have a shoal larger than 6 to 8 specimens; anything lower, and squabbling is likely to happen. Because they are a fast and active species, the tank they live in doesn't need extraneous decor, but offering cover for them to hide in may make them more relaxed.
