= Serrabrycon =

Conservation status
- Least Concern (IUCN 3.1)

Scientific classification
- Kingdom: Animalia
- Phylum: Chordata
- Class: Actinopterygii
- Order: Characiformes
- Family: incertae sedis
- Genus: Serrabrycon; Vari, 1986
- Species: S. magoi

Binomial name
- Serrabrycon magoi Vari, 1986

Species of fish

Serrabrycon is a monospecific genus of freshwater ray-finned fish belonging to the suborder Characoidei within the order Characiformes, the characins. The only species in the genus is Serrabrycon magoi, a species which is found in Brazil Colombia and Venezuela. This taxon has not been assigned to a particular family within the Characoidei and is considered to be incertae sedis, i.e. its taxonomic affinities are, as yet, unclear. It is lepidophagous, eating the scales of other fishes.
