= Acronichthys =

Acronichthys Temporal range: Late Turonian to Maastrichtian

Scientific classification
- Kingdom: Animalia
- Phylum: Chordata
- Class: Actinopterygii
- (unranked): Otophysi
- Family: †Acronichthyidae; Liu et al, 2025
- Genus: †Acronichthys; Liu et al, 2025
- Species: †A. maccagnoi

Binomial name
- †Acronichthys maccagnoi Liu et al, 2025

Acronichthys (from Greek acron "hearing", and ichthys "fish") is an extinct genus of freshwater otophysan fish from the Late Cretaceous of western North America. The only known species is A. maccagnoi (although potential indeterminate species are also known) and is the only known genus in the family Acronichthyidae. Fossils of this genus display a Weberian apparatus, suggesting a developed sense of hearing, as with modern otophysans.

Acronichthys had a wide range throughout western North America from the Turonian to the Maastrichtian, being found as far south as what is now Texas, and as far north as what is now Alberta, Canada. Fossil vertebrae of Acronichthys have long been documented from numerous formations throughout its range, but these were previously classified as indeterminate ostariophysans until the description of articulated, complete specimens from the Scollard Formation in 2025, which allowed for a better understanding of the fish's appearance and biology.

== Evolution ==
As otophysans most likely originated in the Southern Hemisphere, Acronichthys likely descended from a marine ancestor that may have dispersed to North America from West Gondwana during the Early Cretaceous.

== Distribution ==
The earliest fossils of Acronichthys are known from late Turonian-aged deposits in the Kaiparowits Plateau of Utah, US. They are also known from the Santonian-aged Iron Springs Formation of Utah & the Milk River Formation of Alberta, Canada, the Campanian-aged Belly River Group of Alberta & the Aguja Formation of Texas, US, and the Maastrichtian-aged Hell Creek Formation of Montana, the Lance Formation of Wyoming, and the Scollard Formation of Alberta. Aside from the Scollard Formation specimens (which represent articulated skeletons), all other records of Acronichthys are of isolated vertebra. Some vertebra of Acronichthys appear different from those of the species A. maccagnoi, suggesting that other species also existed.
