= Tarumania =

Scientific classification
- Kingdom: Animalia
- Phylum: Chordata
- Class: Actinopterygii
- Order: Characiformes
- Suborder: Characoidei
- Family: Tarumaniidae; De Pinna, Zuanon, Py-Daniel & Petry, 2017
- Genus: Tarumania; De Pinna, Zuanon, Py-Daniel & Petry, 2017
- Species: T. walkerae

Binomial name
- Tarumania walkerae De Pinna, Zuanon, Py-Daniel & Petry, 2017

Genus of fishes

Tarumania is a genus of freshwater fish described in 2017. It contains a single species, Tarumania walkerae, and constitutes the only genus in the family Tarumaniidae. T. walkerae is a predatory species that hunts among the leaf litter on the bottom of flooded forests in the Rio Negro drainage basin.

== Discovery and taxonomy ==
The species first came to the attention of scientists in 2002 in the form of a poorly preserved juvenile specimen collected as part of a survey. The specimen possessed many unusual traits and could not be identified even to family level. Due to the poor preservation, no formal description was attempted until many years later, after the discovery of a living population and collection of better specimens. The genus name Tarumania was chosen after the site of first collection (the Tarumã Mirim River). Tarumania is a characiform, the order which includes piranhas and tetras. Due to its distinctness from all other characiformes, the describers placed it in its own family, Tarumaniidae. Based on their morphological analysis they estimated Tarumaniidae to be most likely the sister group of Erythrinidae, the trahira family, but no DNA evidence was available to confirm or deny this.

== Description and biology ==
Tarumania possesses a very unusual swim bladder, divided into eleven separate compartments (as opposed to one or two in most fish) which extends along almost the entire length of the body. Its body is extremely elongated and oval-shaped, giving the fish an eel-like appearance. Like the unrelated Lepidogalaxias, they have a flexible "neck" that allows them to bend their head at a right angle relative to the trunk.

All specimens of Tarumania were recovered from isolated pools among the leaf-litter of the forest, where they appear to hunt invertebrates such as shrimp on the flooded forest floor. They are well adapted to swim amongst tangled undergrowth, with very mobile pelvic fins that move independently of each other and the ability to twist separately from the rest of the body. They are able to breathe air in shallow-water conditions, but the swim bladder is not involved. Instead they absorb oxygen through their oral cavity.
