= Salminops =

Salminops Temporal range: Cenomanian

Scientific classification
- Kingdom: Animalia
- Phylum: Chordata
- Class: Actinopterygii
- Order: Gonorynchiformes
- Genus: †Salminops; Gayet, 1985

Extinct genus of fishes

Salminops is an extinct genus of prehistoric bony fish that lived during the Cenomanian known from USA and Portugal.

== See also ==
- Prehistoric fish
- List of prehistoric bony fish
