= Scissor (fish) =

Scientific classification
- Kingdom: Animalia
- Phylum: Chordata
- Class: Actinopterygii
- Division: Teleostei
- Order: Characiformes
- Family: incertae sedis
- Genus: Scissor; Günther, 1864
- Species: S. macrocephalus

Binomial name
- Scissor macrocephalus Günther, 1864

Species of fish

Scissor is a monospecific genus of freshwater ray-finned fish belonging to the suborder Characoidei within the order Characiformes, the characins. The only species in the genus is Scissor macrocephalus the distribution of which may be uncertain; it may be Suriname. This taxon has not been assigned to a particular family within the Characoidei and is considered to be incertae sedis, i.e. its taxonomic affinities are, as yet, unclear. This taxon is known only from the holotype.

== Etymology ==
The generic name is based on the Latin for "one who cleaves", a reference to its wide mouth, and the specific epithet is Greek for "large head".
