= Maisey =

Maisey is a surname and given name which may refer to:

- Don Maisey (1915–2005), Australian politician
- Frederick Charles Maisey (1825-1892), English general, archaeological surveyor and painter, active in India
- Maisey Rika (born 1982/1983), New Zealand singer, songwriter and composer

== See also ==
- Maisey-le-Duc, France, a commune
- Maisie (disambiguation)
