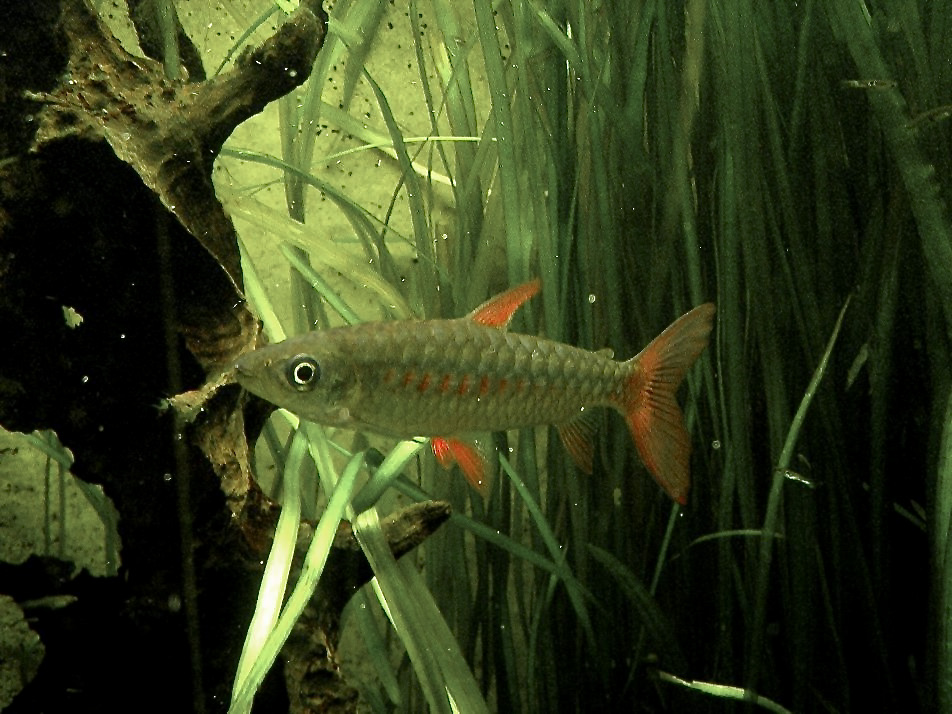

Conservation status
- Least Concern (IUCN 3.1)

Scientific classification
- Kingdom: Animalia
- Phylum: Chordata
- Class: Actinopterygii
- Order: Characiformes
- Family: Chalceidae
- Genus: Chalceus
- Species: C. erythrurus

Binomial name
- Chalceus erythrurus (Cope, 1870)

Synonyms
- Plethodectes erythrurus Cope, 1870; Pellegrinina heterolepis Fowler, 1907; Chalceus macrolepidotus iquitensis Nakashima, 1941

= Tucan fish =

Species of fish

The tucan fish (Chalceus erythrurus), also called the yellowfin chalceus or sardinha, is a species of freshwater ray-finned fish belonging to the family Chalceidae. This fish is found in northern South America.

== Description ==
The tucan fish has a pale-silver body, with bright-yellow ventral fins (hence its other common name); the rest of its fins are some mixture of yellow and red, usually with a reddish tail fin. In terms of size, it reaches 21.4 cm SL. This makes it one of the larger members of the genus Chalceus, outsized only by the pinktail chalceus.

== Etymology ==
The name "tucan fish" directly translates to "toucan fish", as tucán means "toucan" in Spanish. All members of the family Chalceidae are sometimes referred to as tucanfishes, but C. erythrurus is the species to which it is most often applied.

The genus name Chalceus is Greek, and means "brass" or "copper". The specific name erythrurus also originates in Greek, with eruthros meaning "red" and ouros meaning "tail", in reference to its caudal fin usually being reddish.

== Taxonomy ==
Upon being described by Edward Drinker Cope in 1870, the tucan fish was placed in the new genus Plethodectes with the full name Plethodectes erythrurus. However, Cope switched it over to the genus Chalceus in 1872.

It was briefly classified as Chalceus macrolepidotus iquitensis, a subspecies of the pinktail chalceus C. macrolepidotus, by Shoji Nakashima in 1941. Henry Watson Fowler described it as Pellegrinina heterolepis in 1907, but Jacques Géry proved it to be a member of the Chalceus genus in 1977.

The name Chalceus erythrurus was once mistakenly applied to C. macrolepidotus, and they are sometimes confused with one another. They can be told apart because of the tucan fish's bright-yellow ventral fins, as well as a few other coloration patterns.

== Habitat ==
The tucan fish can be found in the Amazon and Solimões rivers, and its habitat extends into Peru by way of the Ucayali river.

== Diet and behavior ==
Like others in the genus Chalceus, the tucan fish is primarily a carnivore, targeting aquatic invertebrates (such as insects and crustaceans). It is known to be somewhat skittish, and may jump out of the water on occasion.
