= Weberian apparatus =

Anatomical structure that connects the swim bladder to the auditory system in fishes

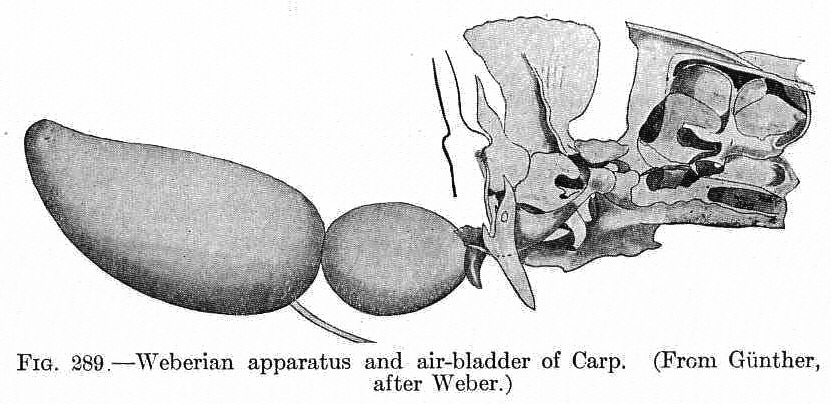
Weberian apparatus and air-bladder of a carp

The Weberian apparatus is an anatomical structure that connects the swim bladder to the auditory system in fishes belonging to the superorder Ostariophysi. When it is fully developed in adult fish, the elements of the apparatus are sometimes collectively referred to as the Weberian ossicles or Weber's ossicles. The presence of the structure is one of the most important and phylogenetically significant distinguishing characteristics of the Ostariophysi. The structure itself consists of a set of minute bones that originate from the first few vertebrae to develop in an embryonic ostariophysan. These bones grow to physically connect the auditory system, specifically the inner ear, to the swim bladder. The structure acts as an amplifier of sound waves that would otherwise be only slightly perceivable by the inner ear structure alone.

== Structural anatomy and function ==
The generalized structure of the Weberian apparatus is akin to a skeletal complex of bones and ossicles that are physically connected to the labyrinth auditory complex anteriorly and the anteriormost region of the swim bladder posteriorly. The entire structure is derived from skeletal elements of the first four vertebrae. The involved elements include: the supraneural bones of the skull; modified neural arch bones, specifically the paired claustra and the scaphia; the intercalarium and the lateral processes; the tripus; the os suspensorium from the fourth vertebra; the parapophysis of vertebra number five including the vertebra itself, plus the vertebra's corresponding pleural rib. In addition, a structure composed of fused neural spines form the dorsal most part of the Weberian apparatus. Together, the structure interacts anteriorly with the lagenar otolith set within the skull and posteriorly with the swim bladder via the pleural rib. Postero-ventrally, it is the tripus, the os suspensorium and the third rib that interact directly with the anterior chamber of the swim bladder.

The Weberian apparatus functions by transmitting auditory signals straight from the gas bladder, through the Weberian ossicles and then straight into the labyrinth structures of the inner ear. The structure essentially acts as an amplifier of sound waves that would otherwise be only slightly perceivable by the inner ear structure alone. With the added function of the swim bladder as a Resonance chamber, signals are amplified to noticeable levels.

== Embryology ==
Embryonic analysis of Weberian apparatuses of the taxon Brycon has shed some light on the development of the structure itself. The Weberian apparatus elements form from the fully distinguishable first five vertebrae of the individual. The supraneural starts as an element of the skull. The claustra and the scaphia develop from expanded elements of the neural arch of the first vertebra (V1). From the second vertebra (V2), the intercalarum and the vertebra's lateral process are reduced and clump together. The plural rib (R1) of the third vertebra (V3) shrinks and moves somewhat ventrally, forming the tripus from a vertebral parapophysis fusing with the pleural rib. The os suspensorium bone of the fourth vertebra (V4) somewhat retains its shape, developing from the pleural rib of the vertebra (R2). The remaining elements of the fifth vertebra (V5), the parapophysis and the articulating rib (R3), including the vertebra itself form the posterior structure of the Weberian apparatus. The neural spines of the first four vertebrae fuse and compress, forming one of the major structures of the apparatus.

Study of the embryology of the Weberian apparatus has since been conducted on various other ostariophysan species, the outcomes of which have resulted in various interpretations of the development (and thus the homology) of the structures that form the structure. Specific studies have been done on the Weberian apparatuses of a few select taxa, including Danio rerio, Rhaphiodon vulpinus and Corydoras paleatus.

== Evolutionary history ==
The earliest recorded incidence of a Weberian apparatus is from the fossil fish Santanichthys diasii dating from the Early Cretaceous of Northeastern Brazil. In the aforementioned taxon, the Weberian apparatus is fairly developed; there is a distinguishable intercalarium and a tripus which articulate with the second and third vertebrae respectively. A scaphium can be seen in at least two specimens. The neural arch of the third vertebra has already broadened, almost similar to that of modern ostariophysans. The claustrum, an element in modern apparati, is noticeably absent from the Weberian apparatus of S. diasii. Only the first four vertebrae are involved in the Weberian apparatus of Santanichthys; There are no signs of involvement from the elements of the fifth vertebra unlike in modern otophysans. An important feature within the formation of the Weberian apparatus, which is a synapomorphy of the Otocephala, is the attachment of the anterior Pleural cavity (rib) to the Swim bladder. Another crucial feature is the anterior otophysic diverticula of the swim bladder and contacting the inner ear, seen in extant Clupeiformes. There is also a relationship between the interossicular ligament and the swim bladder that it originated from the swim bladder diverticulum. This was shown by comparing the fiber of the ligament and the tunica externa of the swim bladder that have the same histological composition of elastin and icthyocoll (a specific type I collagen), as established in a research by Rui Diogo.

The basal fossil otophysan Acronichthys from the Late Cretaceous of Canada displays an transitional Weberian apparatus. This species is thought to represent a lineage of otophysans that colonized freshwater habitats independent of modern otophysan groups, suggesting that the development of a Weberian apparatus is likely linked to the transition to a freshwater habitat.

== Etymology ==
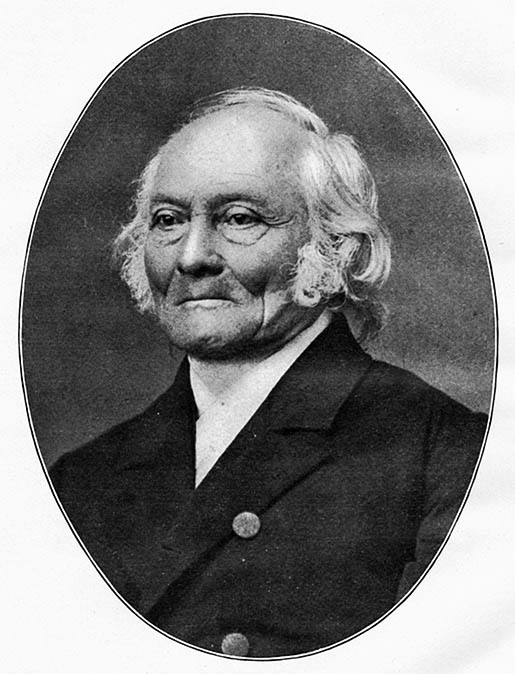
Ernst H. Weber, who first described the structure named after him.

The Weberian apparatus is named after the German anatomist and physiologist Ernst Heinrich Weber (1795 – 1878). The apparatus was first described in detail by Weber. Only four bones were identified, specifically the claustrum, scaphium, intercalarium and tripus. Together, these elements were hypothesized to play a part in auditory functions. Over the years, other functions have been proposed and discarded. Hydrostatic regulation was one of the early alternative suggestions for the function of the apparatus.

== See also ==
- Cyprinidae

== Bibliography ==
- Weber, Ernst Heinrich (1820). De aure et auditu hominis et animalium. I — De aure animalium aquatilium (in Latin). Leipzig, Germany: Gerhard Fleischer.
- Grande, Terry; Mario de Pinna (2004). G. Arratia & A. Tintori (ed.). The evolution of the Weberian apparatus: A phylogenetic perspective (PDF). Mesozoic Fishes 3 – Systematics, Paleoenvironments and Biodiversity. München, Germany: Verlag. pp. 429–448. ISBN 3-89937-053-8. Archived from the original (PDF) on 2015-09-24.
- Manley, Geoffrey A.; Arthur N. Popper; Richard R. Fay (2004). "Chapter 5: Evolution of Single- and Multiple- Ossicle Ears in Fishes and Tetrapods". Evolution of the Vertebrate Auditory System. Chapter by Jennifer A. Clack and Edgar Allin. Springer. p. 415. ISBN 978-0387210933.
- Bird, Nathan C.; L. Patricia Hernandez (2007-06-25). "Morphological variation in the Weberian apparatus of Cypriniformes". Journal of Morphology. 268 (9). Wiley-Liss, Inc., A Wiley Company: 735–757. doi:10.1002/jmor.10550. PMID 17591731. S2CID 29393291.
