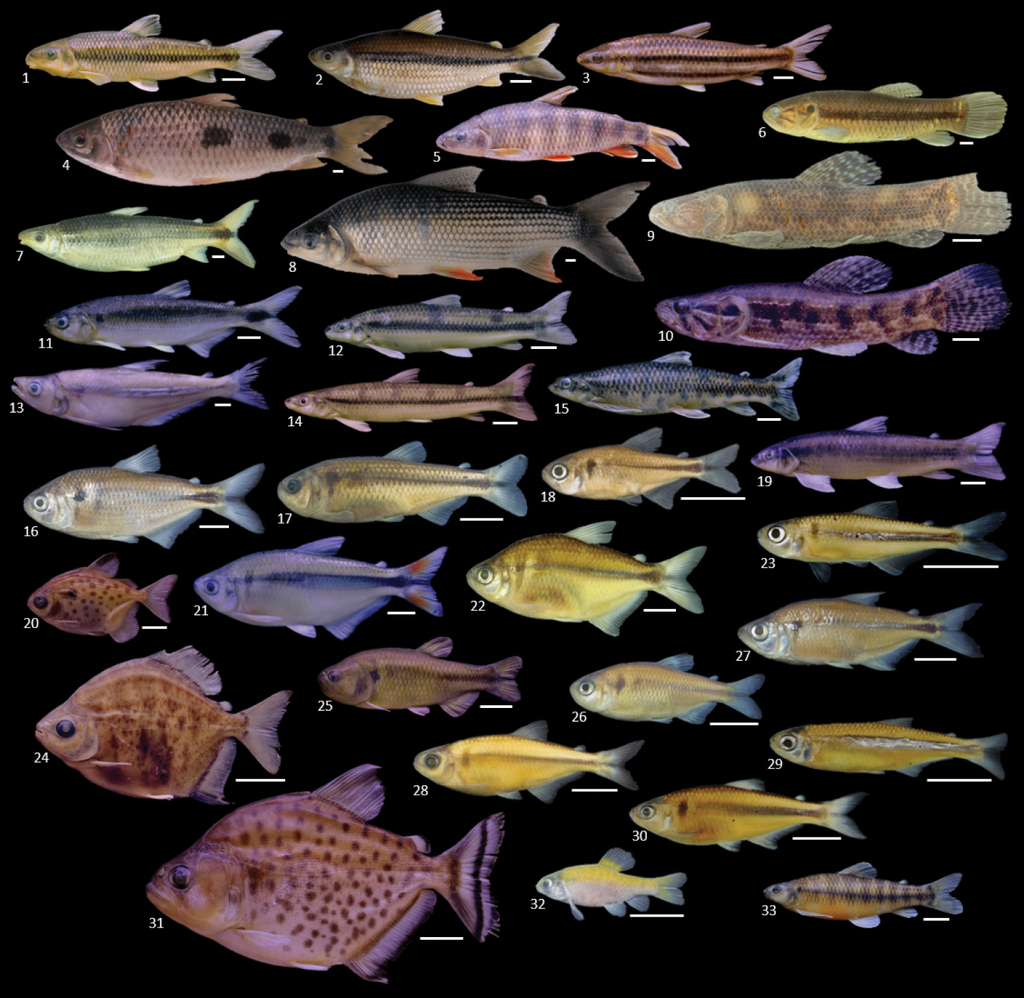
- Diversity of American characiforms from the Uberaba River basin

Scientific classification
- Kingdom: Animalia
- Phylum: Chordata
- Class: Actinopterygii
- Division: Teleostei
- (unranked): Otophysi
- Order: Characiformes; Regan, 1911

Type species
- Charax gibbosus Linnaeus, 1758

Suborders
- Citharinoidei; Characoidei

Cladistically included but traditionally excluded taxa
- Siluriformes

= Characiformes =

Characiformes Temporal range: Late Cretaceous (Turonian) to present Possible Cenomanian occurrence

Order of fishes

Characiformes /ˈkærəsɪfɔːrmiːz/ is an order of ray-finned fish, comprising the characins and their allies. Grouped in 28 recognized families, more than 2000 different species are described, including the well-known piranha and tetras. Characins are most diverse in the Neotropics, where they are found in lakes and rivers throughout most of South and Central America. At least 209 species of characins are found in Africa, including the distichodontids, citharinids, alestids, and hepsetids. The rest of the characins originate in the Americas.

A few characins become quite large, and are important as food or game. Most, however, are small shoaling fish (or forage fish). Many species commonly called tetras are popular in aquaria because of their bright colors, general hardiness, and tolerance towards other fish in community tanks.

== Description ==
Characins possess a Weberian apparatus, a series of bony parts connecting the swim bladder and inner ear. Superficially, the Characiformes somewhat resemble their relatives of the order Cypriniformes, but may have a small, fleshy adipose fin between the dorsal fin and tail. Most species have teeth within the mouth, since they are often carnivorous. The body is almost always covered in well-defined scales. The mouth is also usually not truly protractile.

The largest characins are Hydrocynus goliath (the goliath tigerfish of Alestidae), Salminus brasiliensis or Salminus franciscanus (golden dourado of Bryconidae), and Hoplias aimara (a traíra or wolffish of Erythrinidae), all of which are over 1 m (3.3 ft) long. Many members are under 3 cm (1.2 in), and the smallest in size is about 1.4–1.7 cm (0.55–0.67 in) in the Bolivian pygmy blue characin, Xenurobrycon polyancistrus.

== Taxonomy ==
The Characiformes form part of a series called the Otophysi within the superorder Ostariophysi. The Otophysi contain three other orders, Cypriniformes, Siluriformes, and Gymnotiformes. The Characiformes form a group known as the Characiphysi with the Siluriformes and Gymnotiformes. The order Characiformes is the sister group to the orders Siluriformes and Gymnotiformes, though this has been debated in light of recent molecular evidence.

Originally, the characiformes were all grouped within a single family, the Characidae. Since then, 18 different families have been separated out. However, classification varies somewhat, and the most recent (2011) study confirms the circumscribed Characidae as monophyletic. Currently, 18 families, about 270 genera, and at least 1674 species are known.

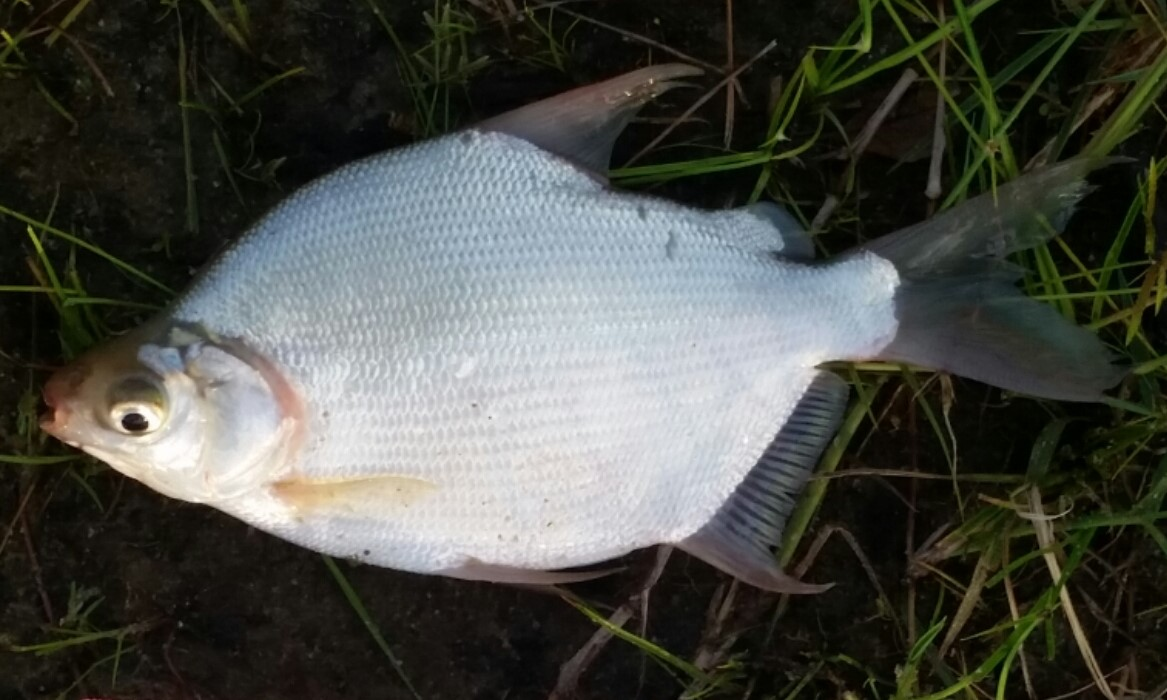
Citharinus congicus is a member of the most basal characiform lineage.

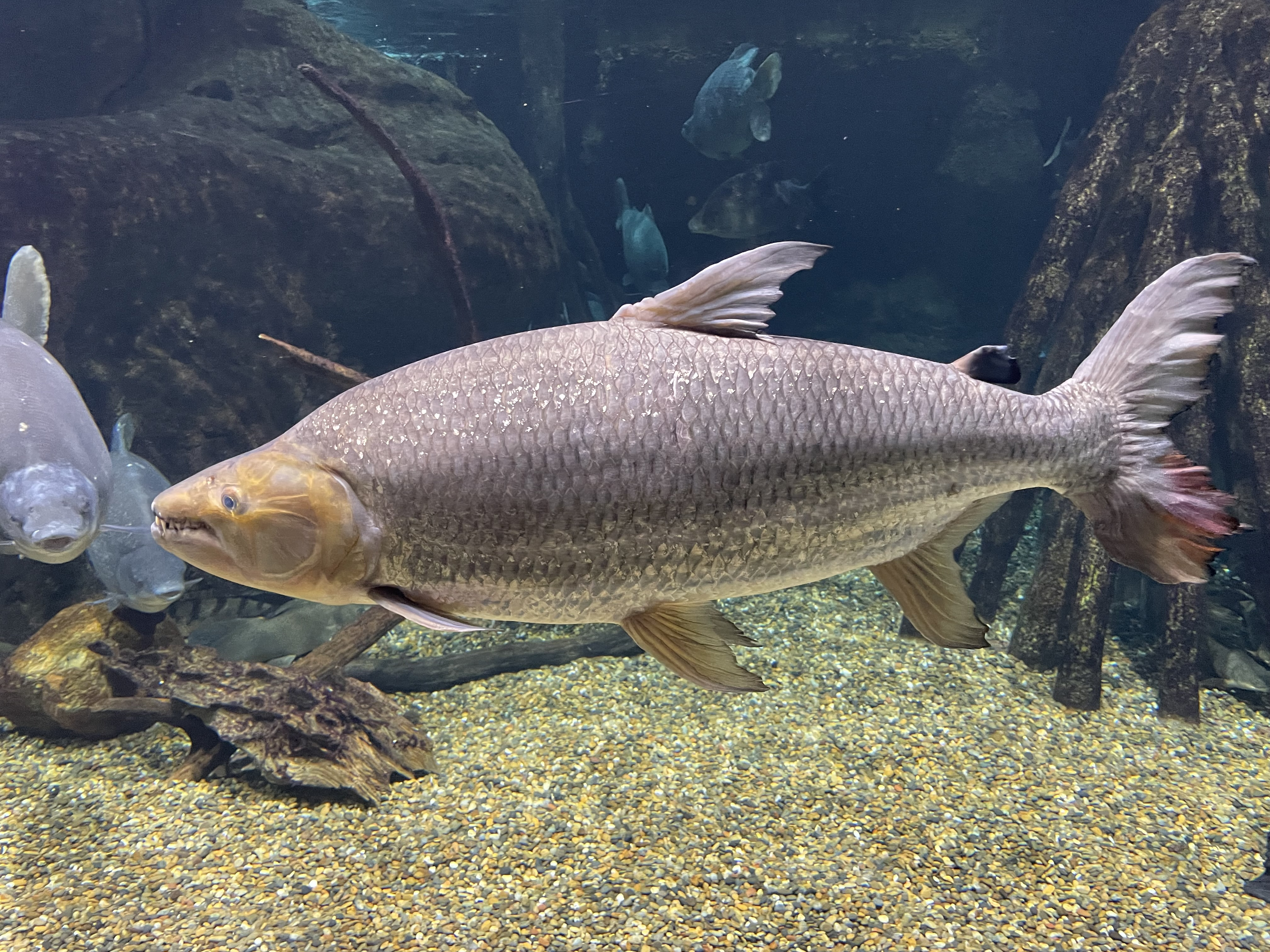
Hydrocynus goliath, from Africa, is one of the largest species in the order.

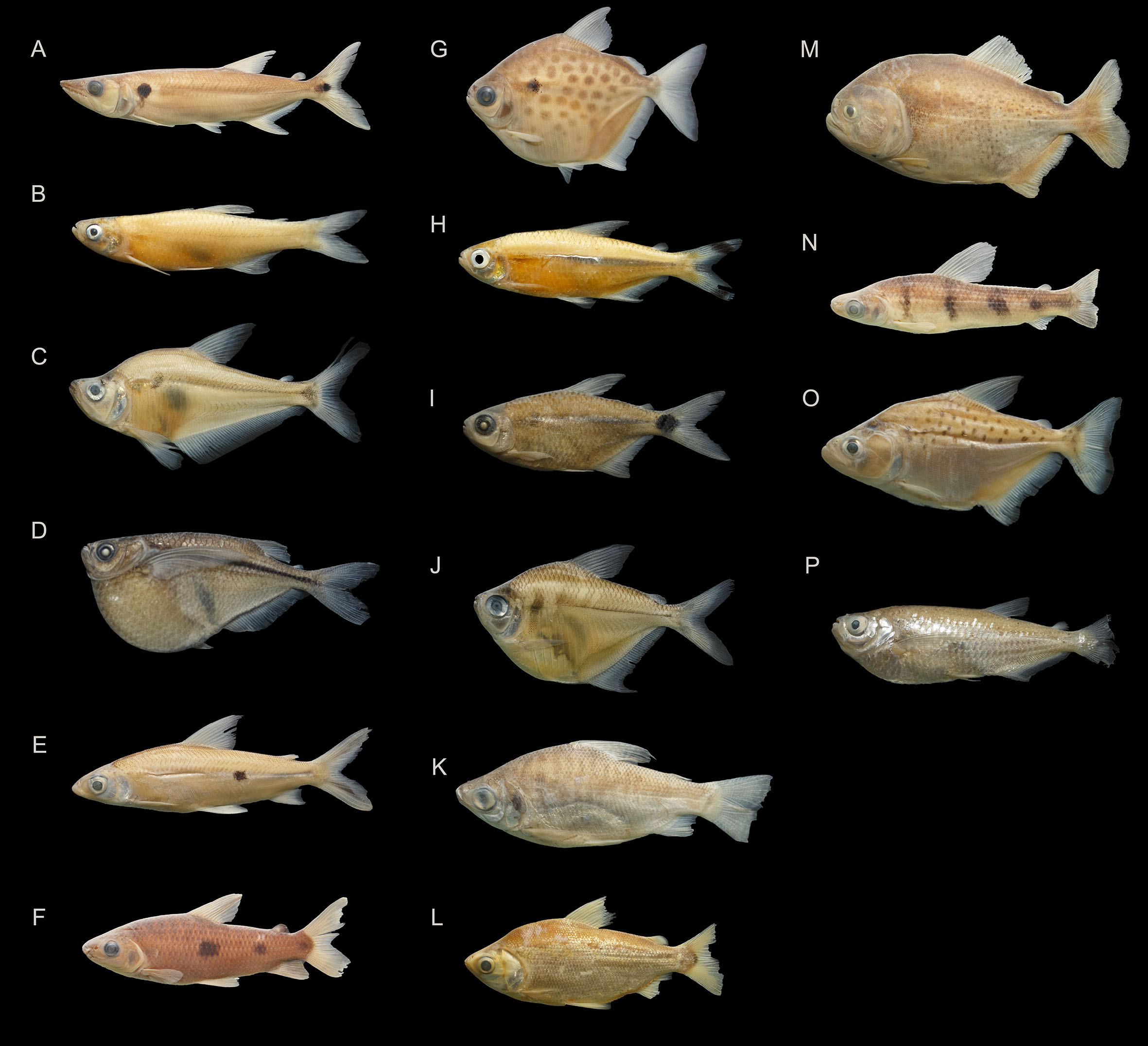
Diversity of characiforms from the Munim River basin

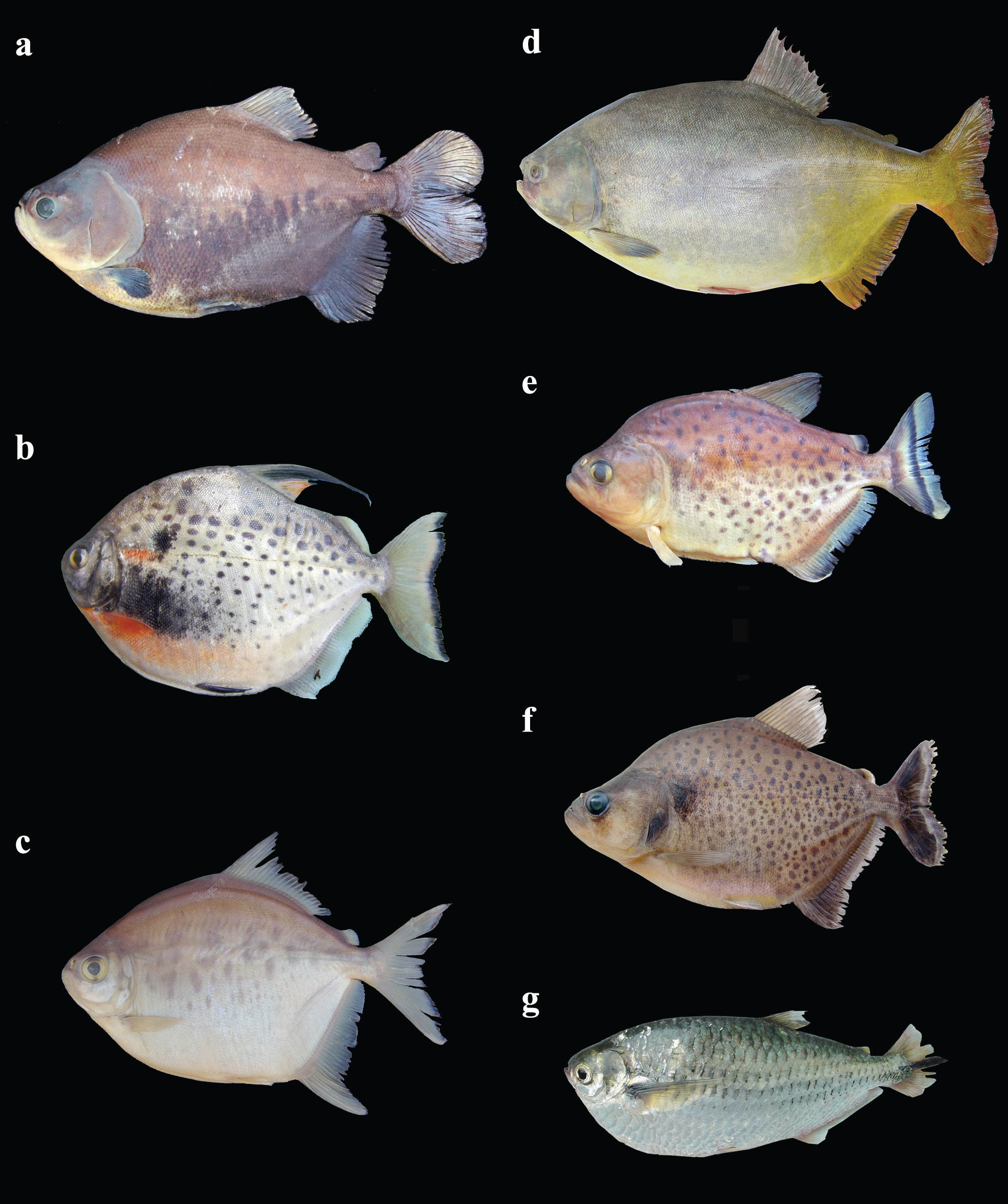
Diversity of large-sized characiforms from the Paraná River basin

The suborder Citharinoidei, which contains the families Distichodontidae and Citharinidae, is considered the sister group to the rest of the characins, suborder Characoidei. This group has a very ancient divergence from the rest of the Characiformes, dating back to the Early Cretaceous or earlier, and it has been suggested that it be better treated as its own order, the Cithariniformes.

Betancur et al (2018) & Melo et al (2022) recognise some infraordinal and superfamilial divisions but these are not recognised by Eschmeyer's Catalog of Fishes, which the following classification is based upon (2025 edition):

  - Suborder Citharinoidei
    - Family Citharinidae Günther, 1864 (citharinids)
    - Family Distichodontidae Günther, 1864 (distichodontids)
  - Suborder Characoidei
    - Family Crenuchidae Günther 1864 (crenuchids)
    - Family Alestidae Cockerell, 1910 (African tetras)
    - Family Lepidarchidae Melo & Stiassny, 2024
    - Family Hepsetidae Hubbs, 1939 (African pikes)
    - Family Tarumaniidae De Pinna, Zuanon, Py-Daniel & Petry, 2017, 2017 (muckfishes)
    - Family Erythrinidae Valenciennes, 1847 (trahiras)
    - Family Parodontidae C. H. Eigenmann, 1910 (darter tetras)
    - Family Cynodontidae Eigenmann, 1903 (sabertoothed characids)
    - Family Serrasalmidae Bleeker, 1859 (piranhas and allies)
    - Family Hemiodontidae Bleeker, 1859 (hemiodontids)
    - Family Anostomidae Günther, 1864 (toothed headstanders)
    - Family Chilodidae Eigenmann, 1910 (headstanders)
    - Family Curimatidae Gill, 1858 (toothless characiforms)
    - Family Prochilodontidae Eigenmann, 1909 (bocachicos)
    - Family Lebiasinidae Gill, 1889 (lebiasinids)
    - Family Ctenoluciidae Schultz, 1944 (pike characids)
    - Family Chalceidae Fowler, 1958 (tucanfishes)
    - Family Triportheidae Fowler, 1940 (hatchet characins)
    - Family Gasteropelecidae Bleeker, 1859 (freshwater hatchetfishes)
    - Family Bryconidae Eigenmann, 1912 (bryconids)
    - Family Iguanodectidae Eigenmann, 1909 (iguanodectids)
    - Family Acestrorhynchidae Eigenmann, 1912 (freshwater barracudas and biting tetras)
    - Family Spintherobolidae Mirande, 2019 (piquiras)
    - Family Stevardiidae Gill, 1858 (stevardiids)
    - Family Characidae Latreille, 1825 (characids)
    - Family Acestrorhamphidae Eigenmann, 1907 (American tetras)
    - Incertae sedis
      - Genus Dectobrycon Zarske & Géry, 2006
      - Genus Gymnocharacinus Steindachner, 1903
      - Genus Leptobrycon Eigenmann, 1915
      - Genus Mixobrycon Eigenmann, 1915
      - Genus Oligobrycon Eigenmann, 1915
      - Genus Schultzites Géry, 1964
      - Genus Scissor Günther, 1864
      - Genus Serrabrycon Vari, 1986
      - Genus Thrissobrycon Böhlke, 1953

== Evolution ==
The Characiformes likely first originated and diversified on the supercontinent of West Gondwana (composed of modern Africa and South America) during the Cretaceous period, though fossils from this time are poorly known. During the Cretaceous Period, the rift between South America and Africa (which would form the Atlantic Ocean) was forming, which may explain the contrast in characiform diversity between the two continents; their low diversity in Africa may explain why some primitive fish families (like the polypterids) and the Cypriniformes coexist with them whereas they are absent in South America, where these fish may have been driven extinct through competition. The characiforms had not spread into Africa soon enough to also reach the land connection between Africa and Asia. The earliest they could have spread into Central America was the late Miocene.

The earliest characiform fossils date back to freshwater deposits from the Late Cretaceous, from the Turonian of Uzbekistan (Bissekty Formation) and the Santonian of Hungary. Other fossil teeth date back to the Cenomanian of Morocco, but it has been suggested that these teeth may be of early ginglymodians. Previously, the oldest characiform was assumed to be Santanichthys of the Early Cretaceous (Albian Age) of Brazil. This presumably marine taxon was used as evidence of characiformes potentially having marine origins. However, more recent studies indicate that Santanaichthys is likely a basal otophysan rather than a characiform. Similarly, Salminops from Spain and Sorbinicharax from Italy, previously also considered potential marine characiforms, are now thought to have no characiform affinities and are considered indeterminate teleosts. Given this, there is no paleontological support for characiforms having marine origins. Two other alleged Eocene European characids, Prohydrocyon Piton, 1938 and Procharacinus Piton, 1938 from France, lack a Weberian apparatus and are very likely not characins, and instead may be related to the enigmatic Thaumaturus.

Eurocharax Gaudant, 1980 is known from a fully-articulated specimen from the Oligocene of France, and appears to represent an estuarine taxon, although its phylogenetic position needs revision.

=== Fossil taxa ===
- Order Characiformes
  - Genus †Eotexachara Wick, 2021 (Late Cretaceous of Texas, US)
  - Genus †Primuluchara Wick, 2021 (Late Cretaceous of Alberta, Canada and Texas, US)
  - Suborder Citharinoidei
    - Genus †Eocitharinus Murray, 2002 (middle Eocene of Tanzania)
  - Suborder Characoidei
    - Genus †Tiupampichthys Gayet & Jegu, 2003 (latest Cretaceous to late Paleocene of Bolivia)
    - Superfamily Characoidea
      - Genus †Bryconetes Weiss, Malabarba & Malabarba, 2014 (Late Eocene/Early Oligocene of Brazil)
      - Genus †Paleotetra Weiss, Malabarba & Malabarba, 2012 (Late Eocene/Early Oligocene of Brazil)

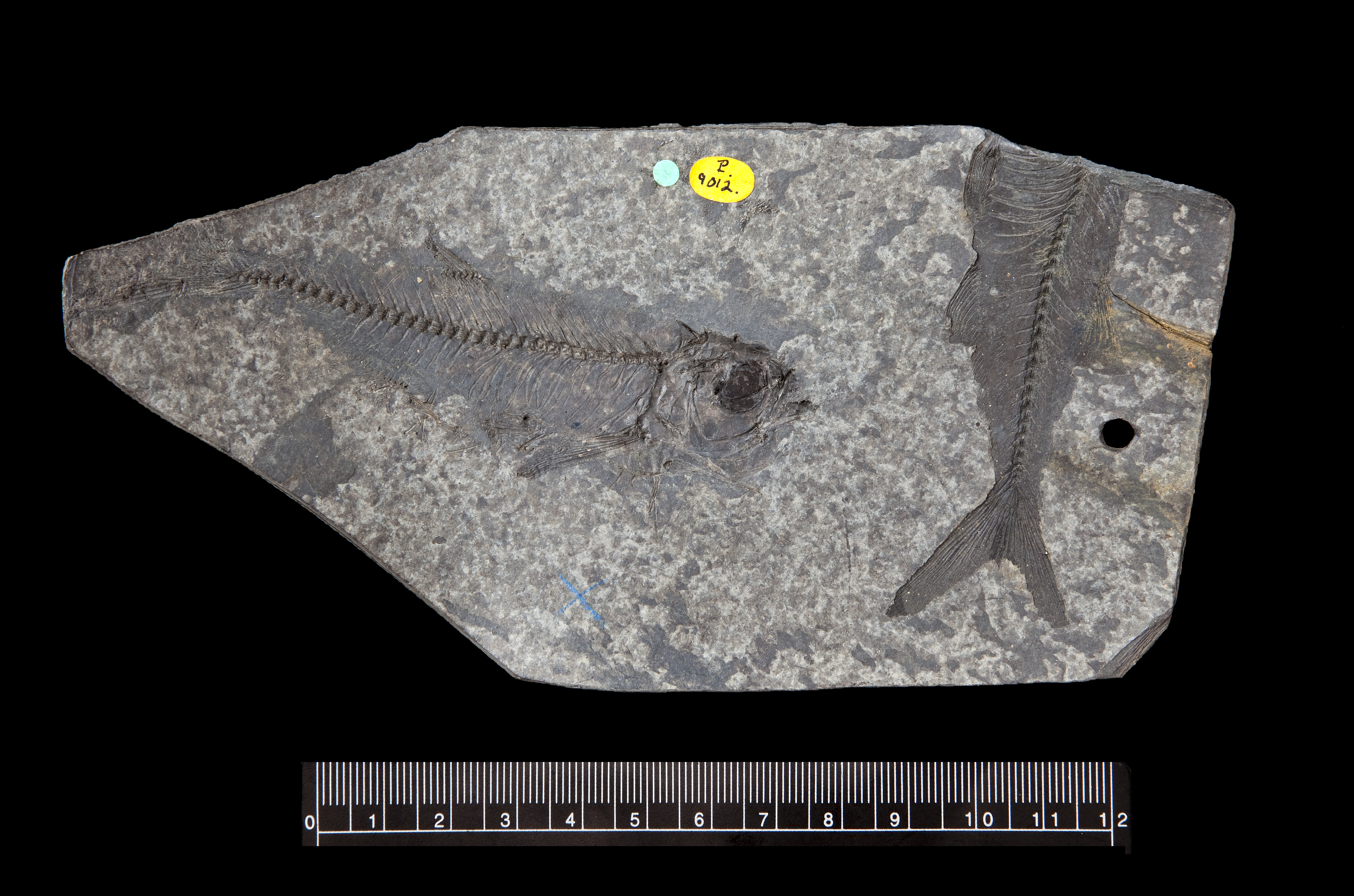
Lignobrycon ligniticus, a fossil characiform from the Oligocene of Brazil

Uniquely, Late Cretaceous characiform fossils are found significantly north of their modern distribution. Indeterminate characiform teeth are known from the Santonian of Hungary and Maastrichtian of France, which have a large, multi-cusped appearance reminiscent of African alestids. Similarly, two Campanian freshwater characiform genera, Primuluchara and Eotexachara, are known from North America, with Primuluchara having a very wide distribution across Laramidia, ranging from Texas to as far north as southern Canada (Dinosaur Park Formation). It is likely that the warmer conditions of the Late Cretaceous allowed early characins to range farther north than the present day, with African characins colonizing Europe and South American characins colonizing North America. Early characins may have had some level of salt tolerance, allowing for such colonizations to take place. Within their modern distribution, a number of modern South American characin families have their earliest occurrences in the Maastrichtian of Bolivia, with isolated teeth and skeletal elements identifiable to Acestrorhynchidae, Characidae, and Serrasalmidae. Characins appear to have inhabited Europe into the Paleogene, with fossil teeth reminiscent of Alestes known from the Early Eocene of Spain.

=== Phylogeny ===
The following cladogram is based on a 2022 time-calibrated phylogeny of genetic data, which found the traditional definition of Characiformes as paraphyletic:

- Citharinoidei
- - Siluriformes
  - Characoidei
    - Crenuchidae
    - - - - Hepsetidae
          - Alestidae
        - - Erythrinidae
          - - - Cynodontidae
              - Serrasalmidae
            - - Parodontidae
              - - Anostomidae
                - - Prochilodontidae
                  - - Chilodontidae
                    - Curimatidae
      - - - Ctenoluciidae
          - Lebiasinidae
        - - Chalceidae
          - - Bryconidae
            - - - Gasteropelecidae
                - Triportheidae
              - - - Iguanodectidae
                  - Acestrorhynchidae
                - Characidae

Below is a phylogeny of living Characiformes based on Betancur-Rodriguez et al. 2017 and Nelson, Grande & Wilson 2016, with the African clades being marked with Af;

- Characiformes
  - Citharinoidei
    - Distichodontidae Günther 1864 Af
    - Citharinidae Günther 1864 Af
  - Characoidei
    - Crenuchales
      Crenuchidae Günther 1864 sensu Froese & Pauly 2001
    - - Erythrinales
        - Alestioidea
          - Hepsetidae Hubbs 1939 Af
          - Alestiidae Cockerell 1910 Af
        - - Erythrinoidea
            - Tarumaniidae de Pinna et al. 2017
            - Erythrinidae Valenciennes 1847
          - - Serrasalmoidea
              - Serrasalmidae Bleeker 1859
              - - Cynodontidae Eigenmann 1903
                - Hemiodontidae Bleeker 1859
            - Anastomoidea
              - Parodontidae Eigenmann 1910
              - - - Prochilodontidae Eigenmann 1909
                  - - Chilodidae Eigenmann 1903
                    - Curimatidae Gill 1858
                - Anostomidae Günther 1864 sensu Nelson 1994
      - Characales
        - Lebiasinoidea
          - Ctenoluciidae Schultz 1944
          - Lebiasinidae Gill 1889
        - - Chalceoidea
            Chalceidae Fowler 1958
          - - Iguanodectoidea
              - Iguanodectidae Eigenmann 1909
              - Acestrorhynchidae Eigenmann 1912
            - Characoidea
              - - Triportheidae Fowler 1940
                - - Bryconidae Eigenmann 1912
                  - Gasteropelecidae Bleeker 1859
              - Characidae Latreille 1825 sensu Buckup 1998
