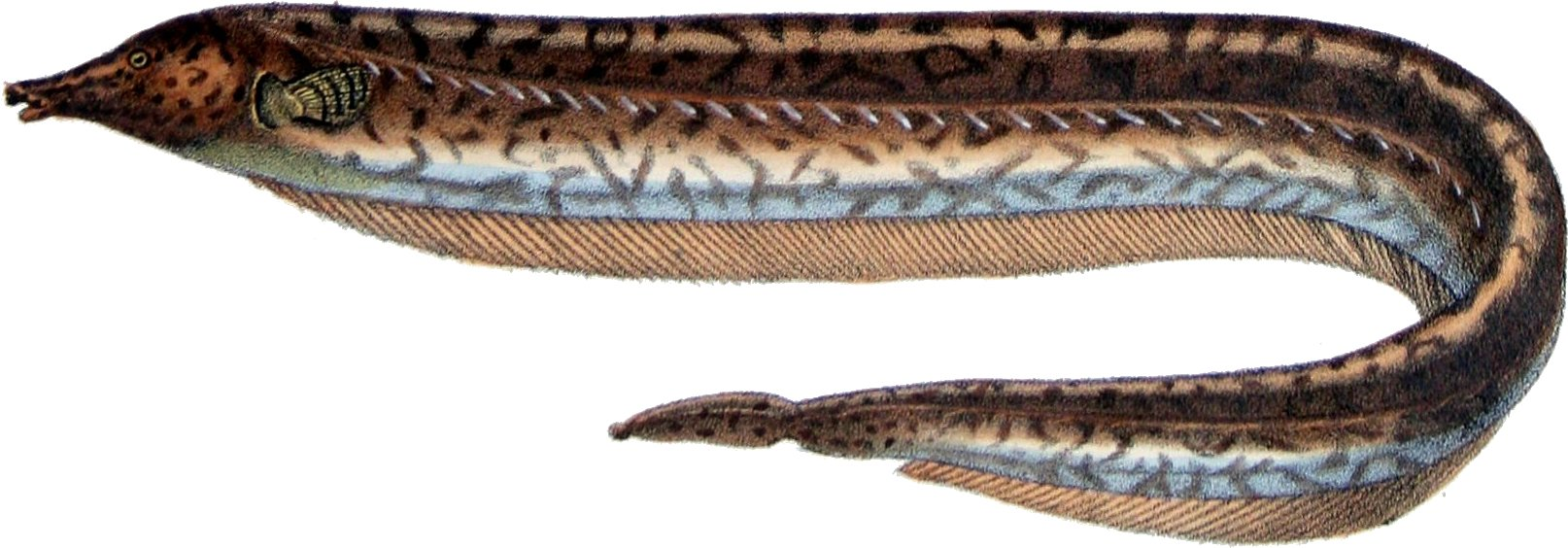
- Rhamphichthys marmoratus

Scientific classification
- Kingdom: Animalia
- Phylum: Chordata
- Class: Actinopterygii
- Order: Gymnotiformes
- Family: Rhamphichthyidae
- Genus: Rhamphichthys; J. P. Müller & Troschel, 1846

Type species
- Gymnotus rostratus Linnaeus, 1766

= Rhamphichthys =

Genus of fishes

Rhamphichthys is a genus of freshwater ray-finned fish belonging to the family Rhamphichthyidae, the sand knifefishes. These fish are eel shaped (or anguiform) with a distinct beak like snout which gave them their name. Like most other knifefish Rhamphichthys species have electrical organs that help them live in the murky waters of South America.

== Etymology ==
Rhamphichthys combines the Greek rhámphos (ῥάμφος), meaning "beak" or "bill" and ichthýs (ἰχθύς), which means "fish". This is a reference to the snout forming a tube in these fishes.

== Species ==
Rhamphichthys contains the following valid species:

- Rhamphichthys apurensis (Fernández-Yépez, 1968)
- Rhamphichthys drepanium Triques, 1999
- Rhamphichthys hahni (Meinken, 1937)
- Rhamphichthys heleios Carvalho & Albert, 2015
- Rhamphichthys lineatus Castelnau, 1855
- Rhamphichthys pantherinus Castelnau, 1855
- Rhamphichthys rostratus (Linnaeus, 1766)

== Range and habitat ==
All species within Rhamphichthys can be found in the major river systems of South America, notably the Amazon basin, Orinoco River, Río de la Plata, and the Paraná River. They have been found in pools created during the rainy season then become isolated as the waters recede. They prefer to stay near the bottom of soft bottom rivers near steep banks with lots of vegetation. These waters are usually extremely murky and full of silt deposits which makes sight difficult, perfect for organisms that can detect their surroundings with weak electric signals.

== Characteristics and biology ==
The sand knifefishes are characterized by their elongated bill-like snout and elongated eel-like body. On average they will reach between 26.5 and 100 cm in length. They have a long anal fin that starts just behind their small pectoral fins and end almost at the end of the body. Their caudal or tail fin is either highly reduced or missing (depending on the species). All species lack both dorsal and pelvic fins but do have a dorsal ridge down the center of their back. They also have very small eyes, not relying on sight to find food or detect other organisms. Coloration varies between species, but all seem to have highly mottles coloration with a lighter base color on the belly (or venter) and darker colors on the back (or dorsum). The spots seem to be larger on the back and get smaller as they move down to the underside. Some individuals seem to have a blue tint to their anal fin, but it is not yet understood if that is characteristic of a species or not. Internally they have highly reduced gill rakers, a large stomach, and an anteriorly positioned anus which lies directly under the pectoral fins.

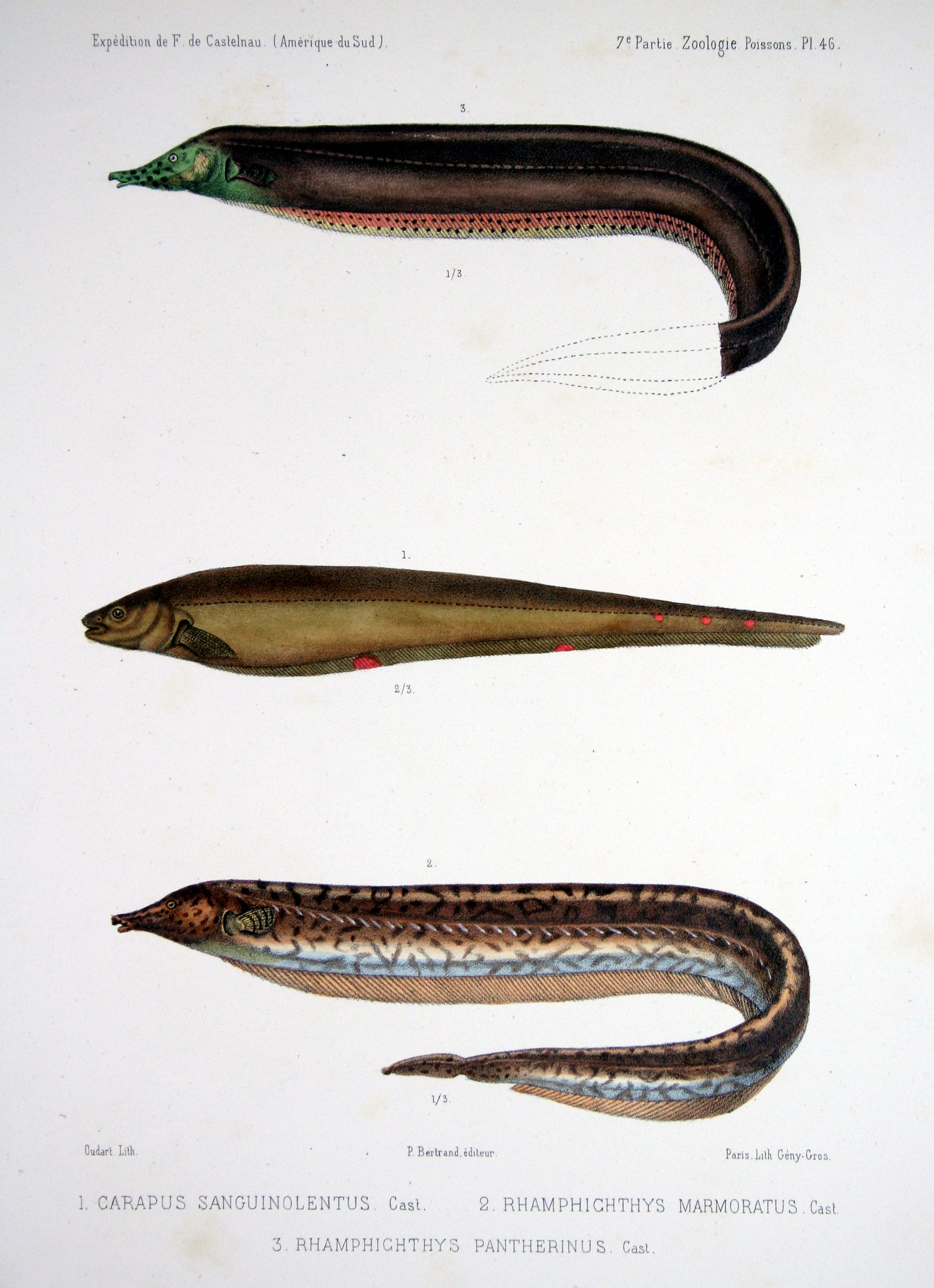
Description plates of different Rhamphichthys species

Not much is known about their behavior and biology. They are opportunistic predators feeding predominately on invertebrates such as insects and crustaceans dug up from the sandy river bottoms, but seem to eat small fish as well. They seem to keep to a relatively small home range and are solitary except while breeding. They use their electrical organs to identify prey, competitors, mates, and possible predators. It is thought they mate during the dry season when waters are warm and low.

== Evolution ==
Within the order Gymnotiformes there are five families: Rhamphichthys along with the genera Steatogenys, Hypopygus, Gymnorhamphichthys and Iracema, lie within the family Rhamphichthyidae which is sister to Hypopmidae. These two families are the second youngest within the Order. The youngest being Apteronotidae. It is interesting to note that there are fewer described species in this order with respect to the number of Families described. This is likely due to how little is known about the group as a whole, they are hard to find and study, so it is likely that there are far more species than currently known about. It is also possible that because of their specialized nature they have not been driven to differentiate further to alter competition loads. Note that the phylogeny in this image is incorrect: all recent phylogenetic and phylogenomic studies report the following interfamily relationships: Gymnotidae ((Hypopomidae, Rhamphichthyidae) (Sternopygidae, Apteronotidae)). See Tagliacollo, V. A., Bernt, M. J., Craig, J. M., Oliveira, C., & Albert, J. S. (2016). Model-based total evidence phylogeny of Neotropical electric knifefishes (Teleostei, Gymnotiformes). Molecular phylogenetics and evolution, 95, 20–33.

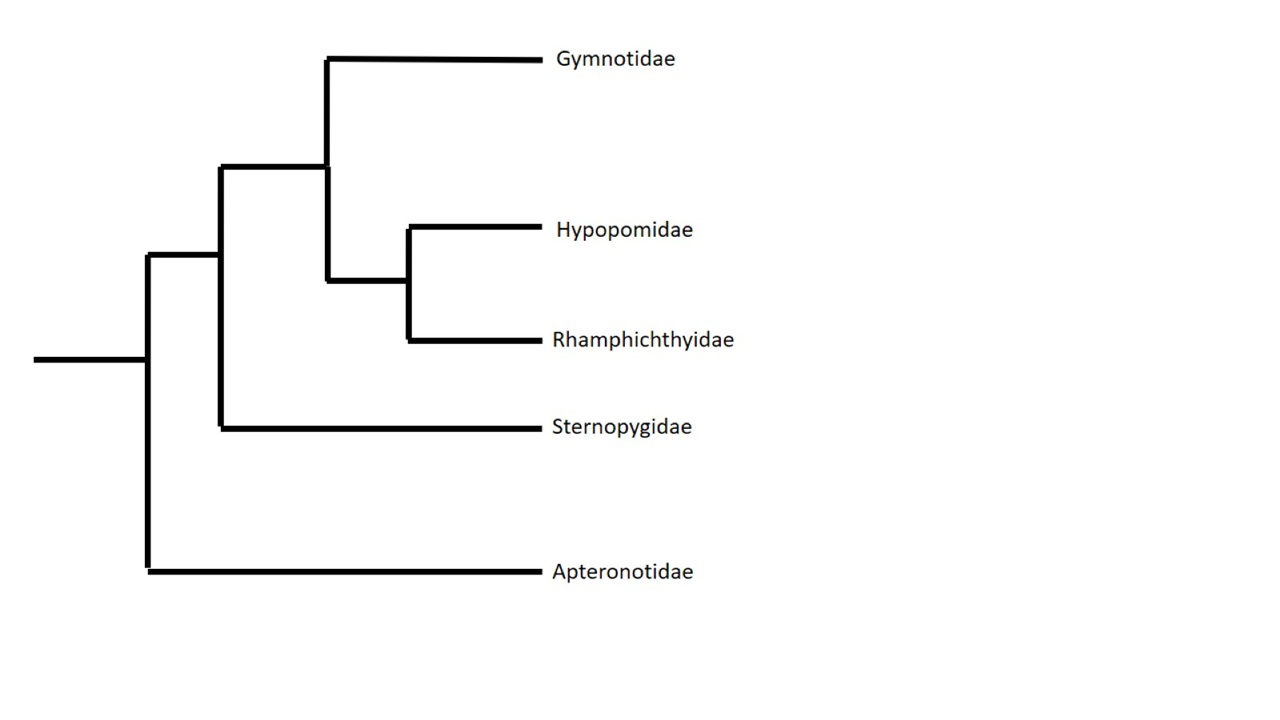
Phylogenetic relationship of the Order Gymnotiformes

== Weakly electric ability ==
Rhamphichthys, like other Gymnotiformes fishes, contain an electric organ that takes up the back third of the body. This electric organ pulses at a constant frequency and allows the fish to 'visualize' its surroundings by forming an electric field around the body. Any disturbance to that electric field indicates an object that is close by. Electroreceptors on the body allow the fish to indicate the type of disturbance which allows them to indicate the type of object that is nearby.

There are different types of electrical pulses that the fish can give off and each has a different function. This is necessary because their electric fields can be disturbed by other fish using their own electrical field, causing 'noise'. This makes it difficult for individuals to orient themselves. By using different types of pulses noise is reduced. Different species emit at different frequency ranges and individuals within a species emit at their own unique frequency. These differences in frequency allow individuals to identify other individuals, not just distinguish between species.

Different types of pulses:

- Orientation – constant low-level output for orientation in the water to avoid obstacles
- Prey location – short pulses that work similar to sonar where disturbance responses identify location of prey items
- JAR (jamming avoidance response) – defense strategy where a strong pulse is emitted to interrupt sensory systems of potential predators or threats
- Gradual Frequency falls – short identifying pulses used to communicate with same species individuals or 'neighbors' for territory identification or finding mates
