= Iracema (disambiguation) =

Iracema [iʁaˈsemɐ] may refer to:

- Iracema, an 1865 novel published by Brazilian author José de Alencar
  - Iracema (1917 film), a Brazilian silent film adaptation
  - Iracema (1949 film), a Brazilian film adaptation
  - Iracema: Uma Transa Amazônica, a 1976 Brazilian film very loosely based on the novel

== Geography (all in Brazil) ==
Municipalities

- Iracema, Ceará
- Iracema, Roraima
- Iracema do Oeste, Paraná
- Iracemápolis, São Paulo
- São João de Iracema, São Paulo

Other geographic features

- Iracema River in Santa Catarina state
- Iracema oil field, Santos Basin off the coast of Rio de Janeiro
- Praia de Iracema (Iracema Beach), beach and a neighborhood in Fortaleza

== People ==
- Hedy Iracema-Brügelmann (1879–1941), a German operatic soprano of Brazilian birth
- Iracema de Alencar (1900–1978), Brazilian actress
- Iracema Trevisan (b. 1982), Brazilian musician and fashion designer

== Other ==
- Iracema (fish), a genus of fish
- Iracema, former name for the Bumba (spider) genus
