= Brachyhypopomus brevirostris =

Conservation status
- Least Concern (IUCN 3.1)

Scientific classification
- Kingdom: Animalia
- Phylum: Chordata
- Class: Actinopterygii
- Order: Gymnotiformes
- Family: Hypopomidae
- Genus: Brachyhypopomus
- Species: B. brevirostris

Binomial name
- Brachyhypopomus brevirostris (Steindachner, 1868)

Synonyms
- Rhamphichthys brevirostris Steindachner, 1868; Hypopomus brevirostris (Steindachner 1868)

Species of fish

Brachyhypopomus brevirostris is a species of freshwater ray-finned fish belonging to the family Hypopomidae, the bluntnose knifefishes. This species is found rivers in the northern part of South America.

== Taxonomy ==
Brachyhypopomus brevirostris was first formally described as Rhamphichthys brevirostris in 1868 by the Austrian ichthyologist Franz Steindachner with its type locality given as the Rio Guaporé in Brazil. In 1994 Francisco Mago Leccia proposed a new genus, Brachyhypopomus, with Rhamphichthys brevirostris as its type species. The genus Brachyhypopomus belongs to the family Hypopomidae which is classified within the order Gymnotiformes.

== Etymology ==
Brachyhypopomus brevirostris is the type species of the genus Brachyhypopomus, this name prefixes brachys-, meaning "short", onto Hypopomus, a reference to the short snout of these fishes in comparison to those in Hypopomus. The specific name, brevirostris, means "short snout", Steindachner describing that of R. brevirostris as "greatly blunted".

== Distribution and habitat ==
Brachyhypopomus brevirostris is found in the drainage systems of the Amazon and Orinoco rivers, it is also found in coastal drainages in northern South America and the northern basin of the Paraguay River. It is found in Colombia, Venezuela, Gutyna, French Guiana, Suriname, Ecuador, Peru, Paraguay, Brazil and Argentina. It is a benthopelagic species which is often associated with floating vegetations.

== Biology ==
Brachyhypopomus brevirostris is a facultative air breather. The females lay around 50 eggs in each spawning.
