= Hypopygus cryptogenes =

Conservation status
- Least Concern (IUCN 3.1)

Scientific classification
- Kingdom: Animalia
- Phylum: Chordata
- Class: Actinopterygii
- Order: Gymnotiformes
- Family: Rhamphichthyidae
- Genus: Hypopygus
- Species: H. cryptogenes

Binomial name
- Hypopygus cryptogenes (Triques, 1997)

Synonyms
- Steatogenys cryptogenes (Triques, 1997); Stegostenopos cryptogenes Triques, 1997

Species of fish

Hypopygus cryptogenes is a species of bluntnose knifefish endemic to Brazil where it is found in the Rio Negro basin. This species can reach a total length of up to 15 cm (5.9 in). It is the only member of the genus Stegostenopos according to FishBase, but studies have shown that it belongs in Hypopygus (making Stegostenopos a junior synonym) and this is followed by the Catalog of Fishes.
