= Paralithoxus bovallii =

Conservation status
- Least Concern (IUCN 3.1)

Scientific classification
- Kingdom: Animalia
- Phylum: Chordata
- Class: Actinopterygii
- Order: Siluriformes
- Family: Loricariidae
- Subfamily: Hypostominae
- Genus: Paralithoxus
- Species: P. bovallii

Binomial name
- Paralithoxus bovallii (Regan, 1906)

Synonyms
- Ancistrus bovallii Regan, 1906; Lithoxus bovallii (Regan, 1906)

Species of fish

Paralithoxus bovallii is a species of freshwater ray-finned fish belonging to the family Loricariidae, the suckermouth armoured catfishes, and the subfamily Hypostominae, the suckermouth catfishes. This catfish is found in northern South America where it occurs in the upper Potaro River drainage in Guyana, the Nickerie and Kabalebo drainages in Suriname, and the upper Araguari and Trombetas Rivers in Brazil. It is a demersal species of stony rivulets. This species grows to a standard length of 5.9 cm (2.3 in). P. bovallii was first formally described as Ancistrus bovallii in 1906 by the British ichthyologist Charles Tate Regan with its type locality given as the Kaat River, a tributary of the Ireng River, in the Potaro basin of Guyana. In 1982 Marinus Boeseman proposed Paralithoxus as a subgenus of Lithoxus and designated this species as the type species. The specific name, bovallii, honours the Swedish biologist and archaeologist Carl Bovallius who collected the holotype.
