= Hypopygus lepturus =

Conservation status
- Least Concern (IUCN 3.1)

Scientific classification
- Kingdom: Animalia
- Phylum: Chordata
- Class: Actinopterygii
- Order: Gymnotiformes
- Family: Rhamphichthyidae
- Genus: Hypopygus
- Species: H. lepturus

Binomial name
- Hypopygus lepturus Hoedeman, 1962

Species of fish

Hypopygus lepturus is a species of freshwater ray-finned fish belonging to the family Rhamphichthyidae, the sand knifefishes. This species is found in South America and is occasionally kept as an aquarium fish. It lives in freshwater and grows up to 10 centimeters long.
