= Paralithoxus planquettei =

Conservation status
- Least Concern (IUCN 3.1)

Scientific classification
- Kingdom: Animalia
- Phylum: Chordata
- Class: Actinopterygii
- Division: Teleostei
- Order: Siluriformes
- Family: Loricariidae
- Subfamily: Hypostominae
- Genus: Paralithoxus
- Species: P. planquettei

Binomial name
- Paralithoxus planquettei (Boeseman, 1982)

Synonyms
- Lithoxus planquettei Boeseman, 1982

Species of fish

Paralithoxus planquettei is a species of freshwater ray-finned fish belonging to the family Loricariidae, the suckermouth armoured catfishes, and the subfamily Hypostominae, the suckermouth catfishes. This catfish is found in French Guiana, Suriname and Brazil where it is found in stony rivulets of the Atlantic coastal drainages between the Maroni and the Kaw River basin. This species grows to a standard length of 7.0 cm (2.8 in).

== Taxonomy ==
Paralithoxus planquettei was formally described as Lithoxus (Paralithoxus) boujardi in 1993 based on a male specimen collected from the Arataye River in the Approuague basin in French Guiana. The species is named after Paul Planquette, an INRA researcher who worked in French Guiana. Paralithoxus was originally erected as a subgenus of Lithoxus in 1982 and subsequently synonymized in 1990. In 2018, a phylogenetic study revealed that there was a deep split between Lithoxus lithoides, the type species of the genus, and all the other Lithoxus species. Alongside P. planquettei, all the Lithoxus species excluding L. lithoides were moved to Paralithoxus.

== Description ==
Paralithoxus planquettei grows to a standard length of 7.0 centimetres (2.8 in).

== Distribution and habitat ==
Paralithoxus planquettei has a fairly wide distribution in French Guiana from the Maroni basin to the Kaw basin along the Atlantic drainages. Its distribution also extends to Suriname and Brazil, in the Maroni and Oyapock rivers that form the border between French Guiana and those countries.

== Conservation ==
Paralithoxus planquettei is classified as being of least-concern by the IUCN. Most of the species' range is protected as part of the Guiana Amazonian Park. The principal threat to the species is high levels of gold and bauxite mining in the Guiana Shield. Gold mining in the region leads to mercury poisoning and changes in river ecology, and has been documented leading to declines in related species like Lithoxus lithoides.
