= Paralithoxus =

Scientific classification
- Kingdom: Animalia
- Phylum: Chordata
- Class: Actinopterygii
- Order: Siluriformes
- Family: Loricariidae
- Subfamily: Hypostominae
- Genus: Paralithoxus; Boeseman, 1982

Type species
- Ancistrus bovallii (Regan, 1906)

Genus of fishes

Paralithoxus is a genus of freshwater ray-finned fishes belonging to the family Loricariidae, the suckermouth armoured catfishes, and the subfamily Hypostominae, the suckermouth catfishes. These fishes are found in South America.

== Taxonomy ==
Paralithoxus was first formally proposed as a subgenus of Lithoxus in 1982 by the Dutch ichthyologist Marinus Boeseman with Ancistrus bovallii designated as its type species. A. bovallii was first formally described in 1906 by Charles Tate Regan with its type locality given as the Kaat River, tributary of Treng River, upper Potaro, Guyana. Some authorities regard this genus as being within the tribe Ancistrini of the subfamily Hypostominae, but Eschmeyer's Catalog of Fishes does not recognise tribes within the subfamily Hypostominae.

In 2018, a phylogenetic study revealed that there was a deep split between Lithoxus lithoides, the type species of the genus Lithoxus, and all the other species in that genus. Consequently, the genus Paralithoxuswhich was synonymized with Lithoxus in 1990, was resurrected. Alongside P. boujardi, all the Lithoxus species excluding L. lithoides were moved to Paralithoxus.

== Species ==
Paralithoxuscontains the following valid species:

- Paralithoxus boujardi (Muller & Isbrücker, 1993)
- Paralithoxus bovallii (Regan, 1906)
- Paralithoxus jariensis (G. S. C. Silva, Covain, C. Oliveira & Roxo, 2017
- Paralithoxus mocidade Rapp-Py-Daniel, A. Oliveira, Bastos, Ito, Zuanon & Briglia-Ferreira, 2019
- Paralithoxus pallidimaculatus (Boeseman, 1982)
- Paralithoxus planquettei (Boeseman, 1982)
- Paralithoxus raso (G. S. C. Silva, Covain, C. Oliveira & Roxo, 2017)
- Paralithoxus stocki (Nijssen & Isbrücker, 1990)
- Paralithoxus surinamensis (Boeseman, 1982)

== Distribution ==
Paralithoxus range from the Oyapock drainage along the border between Brazil and French Guiana, through Suriname west to the Tacutu River along the border between Guyana and Brazil and south to the Uatama and Trombetas rivers of Brazil.

== Description ==
Paralithoxus contains some of the most dorsoventrally flattened fishes in the world. They can be distinguished from most loricariids by having a round instead of oval lower lip. The lower lip is large and round as in Exastilithoxus with the edge sometimes frilled, but not with the barbels seen in Exastilithoxus.

Paralithoxus species have a unique, enlarged, thin-walled stomach from which the intestine exits dorsally. The stomach is expanded, thin-walled, and clear and is used in breathing air. A thin, clear tube exits the main body of the stomach anterodorsally, terminating at the pylorus just anterior to the posterior extent of the stomach. The intestine tends to have less coils than other members of Ancistrini. The expanded stomach is slightly larger in males; this is due to the males having more space due to a difference in the relative size of the gonads.

Colouration in Paralithoxus species is typically slate gray to tan with a few lighter markings on the body; there are occasionally bands in the pectoral and caudal fins. The ventral surface ranges from white to slightly lighter than the sides. The abdomen is naked (scaleless and unplated). The caudal fin is slightly forked.

Breeding males develop extremely long odontodes on the leading edge of the pectoral fin spine.

== Ecology ==
Paralithoxus species are rheophilic, meaning they prefer to inhabit fast-moving water. Paralithoxus is said to inhabit both rivulets and medium-sized creeks. Paralithoxus have been collected from riffles on the main-stem Essequibo River in Guyana. These peripheral habitats are among the first parts of the river to dry and the respiratory stomach may have evolved to handle this periodic drying. The flattened morphology suggests that Paralithoxus species live under rocks.

Paralithoxus have a unique air-holding stomach. The large size and small number of eggs suggest that parental care is well developed, but nothing is known of the breeding habits of Paralithoxus.
