= Hypopygus neblinae =

Conservation status
- Least Concern (IUCN 3.1)

Scientific classification
- Kingdom: Animalia
- Phylum: Chordata
- Class: Actinopterygii
- Order: Gymnotiformes
- Family: Rhamphichthyidae
- Genus: Hypopygus
- Species: H. neblinae

Binomial name
- Hypopygus neblinae Mago-Leccia, 1994

Species of fish

Hypopygus neblinae is a species of freshwater ray-finned fish belonging to the family Rhamphichthyidae, the sand knifefishes. This species is found in Brazil, Colombia, Guyana and Venezuela, living among the leaves and roots of submerged marginal vegetation. This fish has a maximum total length of 12.2 cm (4.8 in). This species is used in the aquarium trade where it may be called the marbled knifefish.
