= Brachyhypopomus walteri =

Scientific classification
- Kingdom: Animalia
- Phylum: Chordata
- Class: Actinopterygii
- Order: Gymnotiformes
- Family: Hypopomidae
- Genus: Brachyhypopomus
- Species: B. walteri

Binomial name
- Brachyhypopomus walteri Sullivan, Zuanon & Cox Fernandes, 2013

Species of fish

Brachyhypopomus walteri is a species of electric knifefish. The species was discovered in the Central Amazon.
