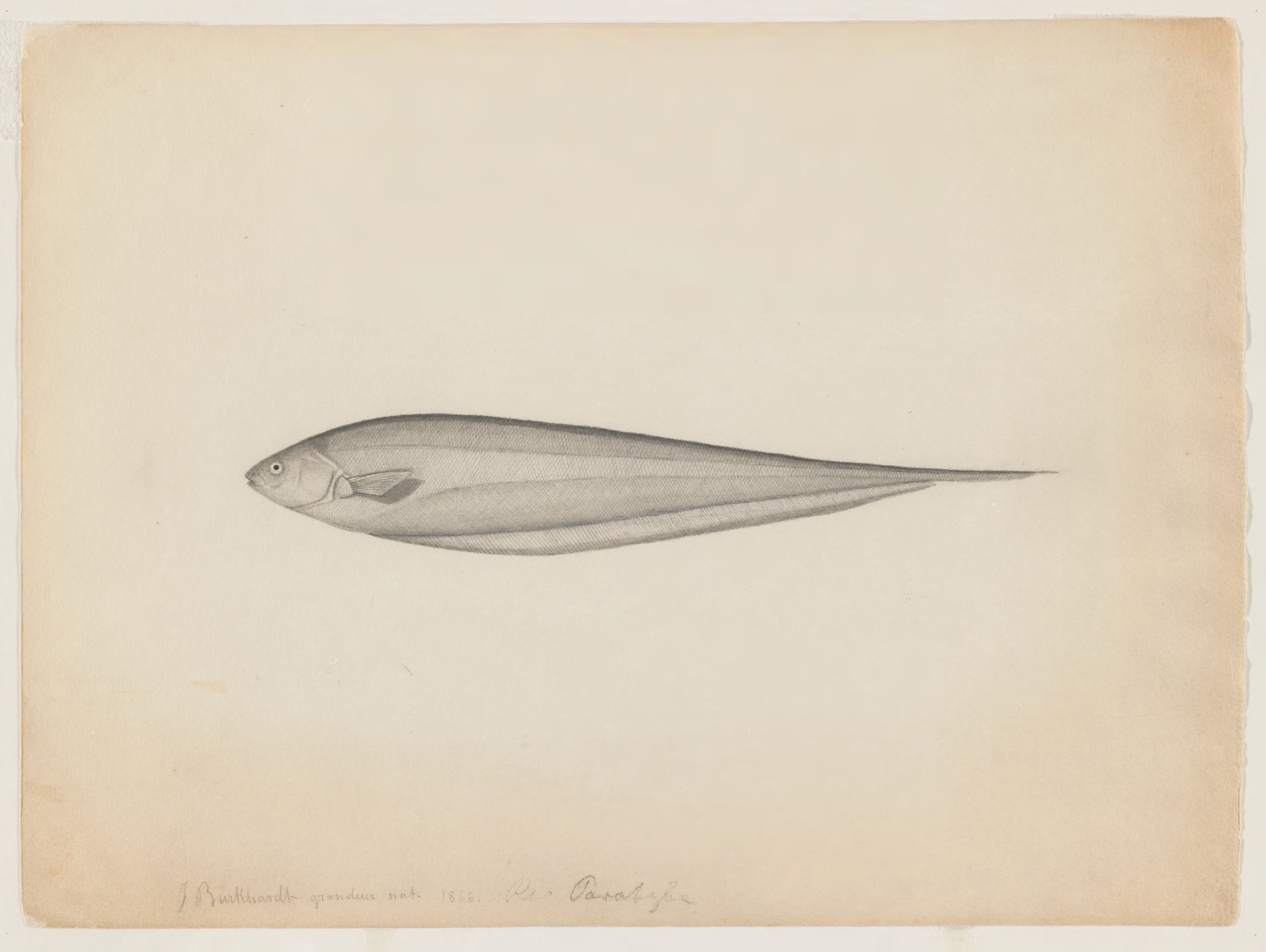
- Brachyhypopomus

Scientific classification
- Kingdom: Animalia
- Phylum: Chordata
- Class: Actinopterygii
- Order: Gymnotiformes
- Family: Hypopomidae
- Genus: Brachyhypopomus; Mago-Leccia, 1994

Type species
- Rhamphichthys brevirostris Steindachner, 1868

Synonyms
- Odontohypopomus Sullivan, Zuanon & Cox Fernandes, 2013

= Brachyhypopomus =

Genus of fishes

Brachyhypopomus is a genus of fish in the family Hypopomidae (bluntnose knifefish) native primarily to tropical and subtropical South America (south to the Río de la Plata Basin), although a single species, B. occidentalis, also occurs in Panama and Costa Rica. They are found in a wide range of static or slow-flowing freshwater habitats such as edges of rivers, streams, floodplains and swamps, but they are absent from deep river channels (a habitat of many other knifefish). There are both species in well-oxygenated waters and poorly oxygenated waters; those in the latter have adaptions that allow them to survive this like larger gills or the capability of gulping up mouthfuls of air from the water surface. Brachyhypopomus feed during the night on small invertebrates.

They are small to medium sized knifefish, reaching up to 12–46 cm (4.7–18.1 in) in total length depending on the species involved. Overall the various species are similar in general shape, but they do differ in morphometrics and meristics. They vary in general color and pattern, but are well-camouflaged and typically brownish. During the night they change color and become very pale, even species that are dark-colored during the day. Brachyhypopomus are very similar to Microsternarchus and Procerusternarchus.

== Species ==
These are the currently recognized species in this genus:

- Brachyhypopomus alberti Crampton, de Santana, Waddell & Lovejoy, 2017
- Brachyhypopomus arrayae Crampton, de Santana, Waddell & Lovejoy, 2017
- Brachyhypopomus batesi Crampton, de Santana, Waddell & Lovejoy, 2017
- Brachyhypopomus beebei (Schultz, 1944)
- Brachyhypopomus belindae Crampton, de Santana, Waddell & Lovejoy, 2017
- Brachyhypopomus benjamini Crampton, de Santana, Waddell & Lovejoy, 2017
- Brachyhypopomus bennetti Sullivan, Zuanon & Cox-Fernandes, 2013
- Brachyhypopomus bombilla Loureiro & A. C. Silva, 2006
- Brachyhypopomus brevirostris (Steindachner, 1868)
- Brachyhypopomus bullocki Sullivan & Hopkins, 2009
- Brachyhypopomus cunia Crampton, de Santana, Waddell & Lovejoy, 2017
- Brachyhypopomus degy Dutra, Peixoto, Ochoa, Ohara, de Santana, Menezes & Datovo, 2021
- Brachyhypopomus diazi (Fernández-Yépez, 1972)
- Brachyhypopomus draco Giora, L. R. Malabarba & Crampton, 2008
- Brachyhypopomus flavipomus Crampton, de Santana, Waddell & Lovejoy, 2017
- Brachyhypopomus gauderio Giora & Malabarba, 2009
- Brachyhypopomus hamiltoni Crampton, de Santana, Waddell & Lovejoy, 2017
- Brachyhypopomus hendersoni Crampton, de Santana, Waddell & Lovejoy, 2017
- Brachyhypopomus janeiroensis (W. J. E. M. Costa & Campos-da-Paz, 1992)
- Brachyhypopomus jureiae Triques & Khamis, 2003
- Brachyhypopomus menezesi Crampton, de Santana, Waddell & Lovejoy, 2017
- Brachyhypopomus occidentalis (Regan, 1914)
- Brachyhypopomus palenque Crampton, de Santana, Waddell & Lovejoy, 2017
- Brachyhypopomus pinnicaudatus (Hopkins, Comfort, Bastian & Bass, 1990)
- Brachyhypopomus provenzanoi Crampton, de Santana, Waddell & Lovejoy, 2017
- Brachyhypopomus regani Crampton, de Santana, Waddell & Lovejoy, 2017
- Brachyhypopomus sullivani Crampton, de Santana, Waddell & Lovejoy, 2017
- Brachyhypopomus verdii Crampton, de Santana, Waddell & Lovejoy, 2017
- Brachyhypopomus walteri Sullivan, Zuanon & Cox Fernandes, 2013
