= Hypopygus =

Scientific classification
- Kingdom: Animalia
- Phylum: Chordata
- Class: Actinopterygii
- Order: Gymnotiformes
- Family: Rhamphichthyidae
- Genus: Hypopygus; Hoedeman, 1962

Type species
- Hypopygus lepturus Hoedeman, 1962

Synonyms
- Stegostenopos Triques, 1997

Genus of fishes

Hypopygus is a genus of South American gymnotiform knifefishes native to the Amazon, Orinoco and upper Paraguay basins, as well as rivers in the Guianas. They are often common, and found near submerged roots, aquatic vegetation and leaf-litter in streams, edges of rivers and floodplains. They are regularly found among vegetation in floating meadows, a habitat that often contains little oxygen, but they are well-adapted to this.

They are well-camouflaged and brown in color with a banded/mottled pattern. They generally resemble the related Steatogenys, but are smaller, reaching up to 5.9–12.2 cm (2.3–4.8 in) in total length depending on the exact species of Hypopygus. The smallest is H. hoedemani, which is the second-smallest knifefish, after Microsternarchus brevis. They are nocturnal and feed on small invertebrates. During the day they remain hidden, often in groups that may number several dozen individuals.

== Taxonomy and species ==
Hypopygus has traditionally been included in the family Hypopomidae, but a comprehensive molecular study from 2015 showed it belongs in Rhamphichthyidae, and this has been followed by recent authorities.

Hypopygus contains the following species:

- Hypopygus benoneae L. A. W. Peixoto, Dutra, de Santana & Wosiacki, 2013
- Hypopygus cryptogenes (Triques, 1997)
- Hypopygus hoedemani de Santana & Crampton, 2011 (Hoedeman's Hypopygus)
- Hypopygus isbruckeri de Santana & Crampton, 2011 (Isbrücker's Hypopygus)
- Hypopygus lepturus Hoedeman, 1962
- Hypopygus minissimus de Santana & Crampton, 2011
- Hypopygus neblinae Mago-Leccia, 1994
- Hypopygus nijsseni de Santana & Crampton, 2011 (Nijssen's Hypopygus)
- Hypopygus ortegai de Santana & Crampton, 2011 (Ortega's Hypopygus)
- Hypopygus varii Campos-da-Paz 2018
