= Paralithoxus surinamensis =

Conservation status
- Least Concern (IUCN 3.1)

Scientific classification
- Kingdom: Animalia
- Phylum: Chordata
- Class: Actinopterygii
- Order: Siluriformes
- Family: Loricariidae
- Subfamily: Hypostominae
- Genus: Paralithoxus
- Species: P. surinamensis

Binomial name
- Paralithoxus surinamensis (Boeseman, 1982)

Synonyms
- Lithoxus surinamensis Boeseman, 1982

Species of fish

Paralithoxus surinamensis is a species of freshwater ray-finned fish belonging to the family Loricariidae, the suckermouth armoured catfishes, and the subfamily Hypostominae, the suckermouth catfishes. This catfish is endemic to Suriname where it is found in Suriname, Coppename and Maroni drainages in fast-flowing forest streams. This species grows to a standard length of 4.1 cm (1.6 in).
