= Paralithoxus boujardi =

Conservation status
- Near Threatened (IUCN 3.1)

Scientific classification
- Kingdom: Animalia
- Phylum: Chordata
- Class: Actinopterygii
- Order: Siluriformes
- Family: Loricariidae
- Subfamily: Hypostominae
- Genus: Paralithoxus
- Species: P. boujardi

Binomial name
- Paralithoxus boujardi (So. Muller & Isbrücker, 1993)

Synonyms
- Lithoxus boujardi So. Muller & Isbrücker, 1993

Species of fish

Paralithoxus boujardi is a species of freshwater ray-finned fish belonging to the family Loricariidae, the suckermouth armoured catfishes, and the subfamily Hypostominae, the suckermouth catfishes. This catfish is endemic to French Guiana where it occurs in the Approuague and Oyapock River basins. P. boujardi frequents fast flowing waters of rivers and creeks with a rock or sand substrate. This species grows to a standard length of 6.5 cm (2.6 in).

== Taxonomy ==
Paralithoxus boujardi was formally described as Lithoxus boujardi in 1993 based on a male specimen collected from the Arataye River in the Approuague basin in French Guiana. The species is named after Thierry Boujard, an INRAE researcher who worked for six years in French Guiana. In 2018, a phylogenetic study revealed that there was a deep split between Lithoxus lithoides, the type species of the genus, and all the other Lithoxus species. Consequently, the genus Paralithoxus, originally erected as a subgenus of Lithoxus in 1982 and subsequently synonymized in 1990, was resurrected. Alongside P. boujardi, all the Lithoxus species excluding L. lithoides were moved to Paralithoxus.

== Description ==
This species grows to a standard length of 6.5 centimetres (2.6 in).

== Distribution and habitat ==
Paralithoxus boujardi is endemic to French Guiana, where it is known from the Approuague and Oyapock River basins. It may also live in the Compté River. Its distribution is probably undermapped and needs further study. It inhabits small, fast-flowing streams in forests, where it lives under rocks on the streambed.

== Conservation ==
Paralithoxus boujardi is classified as being near-threatened by the IUCN. The principal threat to the species is high levels of gold and bauxite mining in the Guiana Shield. Gold mining in the region leads to mercury poisoning and changes in river ecology, and has been documented leading to declines in related species like Lithoxus lithoides.
