= Paralithoxus pallidimaculatus =

Conservation status
- Near Threatened (IUCN 3.1)

Scientific classification
- Kingdom: Animalia
- Phylum: Chordata
- Class: Actinopterygii
- Order: Siluriformes
- Family: Loricariidae
- Subfamily: Hypostominae
- Genus: Paralithoxus
- Species: P. pallidimaculatus

Binomial name
- Paralithoxus pallidimaculatus (Boeseman, 1982)

Synonyms
- Lithoxus (Paralithoxus) pallidimaculatus Boeseman, 1982; Lithoxus pallidimaculatus Boeseman, 1982

Species of fish

Paralithoxus pallidimaculatus is a species of freshwater ray-finned fish belonging to the family Loricariidae, the suckermouth armoured catfishes, and the subfamily Hypostominae, the suckermouth catfishes. endemic to Suriname where it is found in stony rivulets of the Suriname River and Coppename River; it may also be found in the Maroni and Saramacca Rivers, although the specific identity of the Paralithoxus catfishes in these rivers needs confirmation. This species grows to a standard length of 4.7 cm (1.9 in).
