= Hypostomus occidentalis =

Scientific classification
- Kingdom: Animalia
- Phylum: Chordata
- Class: Actinopterygii
- Order: Siluriformes
- Family: Loricariidae
- Genus: Hypostomus
- Species: H. occidentalis

Binomial name
- Hypostomus occidentalis Boeseman, 1968

Synonyms
- Hypostomus gymnorhynchus occidentalis

Species of catfish

Hypostomus occidentalis is a species of catfish in the family Loricariidae. It is native to South America, where it occurs in the Suriname River basin in Suriname. The species reaches 14.6 cm (5.7 inches) in standard length and is believed to be a facultative air-breather.
