= Microsternarchus bilineatus =

Conservation status
- Least Concern (IUCN 3.1)

Scientific classification
- Kingdom: Animalia
- Phylum: Chordata
- Class: Actinopterygii
- Order: Gymnotiformes
- Family: Hypopomidae
- Genus: Microsternarchus
- Species: M. bilineatus

Binomial name
- Microsternarchus bilineatus Fernández-Yépez, 1968

Species of fish

Microsternarchus bilineatus is a species of bluntnose knifefish that is found in Brazil and Venezuela. This species can reach a length of 12 centimetres (4.7 in) TL.
