= Hypostomus tapanahoniensis =

Scientific classification
- Kingdom: Animalia
- Phylum: Chordata
- Class: Actinopterygii
- Order: Siluriformes
- Family: Loricariidae
- Genus: Hypostomus
- Species: H. tapanahoniensis

Binomial name
- Hypostomus tapanahoniensis Boeseman, 1969

Synonyms
- Hypostomus gymnorhynchus tapanahoniensis

Species of catfish

Hypostomus tapanahoniensis is a species of catfish in the family Loricariidae. It is native to South America, where it occurs in the Maroni basin in Suriname. The species reaches 17 cm (6.7 inches) in standard length and is believed to be a facultative air-breather.
