= Akawaio =

Akawaio may refer to:

- Akawaio people, an Indigenous people of South America
- Akawaio language, the language of the Akawaio people
- Akawaio (fish), a genus of fish
