= Exastilithoxus fimbriatus =

Conservation status
- Data Deficient (IUCN 3.1)

Scientific classification
- Kingdom: Animalia
- Phylum: Chordata
- Class: Actinopterygii
- Order: Siluriformes
- Family: Loricariidae
- Genus: Exastilithoxus
- Species: E. fimbriatus

Binomial name
- Exastilithoxus fimbriatus (Steindachner, 1915)

Synonyms
- Pseudacanthicus (Lithoxus) fimbriatus Steindachner, 1915

Species of fish

Exastilithoxus fimbriatus is a species of freshwater ray-finned fish belonging to the family Loricariidae, the suckermouth armoured catfishes, and the subfamily Hypostominae, the suckermouth catfishes. This catfish is endemic to Venezuela where it is known with certainty only from the vicinity of its type locality, upper Caroni River basin. The International Union for Conservation of Nature have assessed this species as Data Deficient because of uncertainty about its actual distribution. This species grows to a standard length of 6.0 centimetres (2.4 in).
