= Paralithoxus stocki =

Conservation status
- Least Concern (IUCN 3.1)

Scientific classification
- Kingdom: Animalia
- Phylum: Chordata
- Class: Actinopterygii
- Order: Siluriformes
- Family: Loricariidae
- Subfamily: Hypostominae
- Genus: Paralithoxus
- Species: P. stocki

Binomial name
- Paralithoxus stocki (Nijssen & Isbrücker, 1990)

Synonyms
- Lithoxus stocki Nijssen & Isbrücker, 1990

Species of fish

Paralithoxus stocki is a species of freshwater ray-finned fish belonging to the family Loricariidae, the suckermouth armoured catfishes, and the subfamily Hypostominae, the suckermouth catfishes. This catfish is found in French Guiana and Suriname where it occurs in the Maroni and Mana river basins. P. stocki is found in small streams in forests, as well as larger rivers, where it occurs in sunny, fast flowing riffles and rapids. This species grows to a standard length of 6.6 cm (2.6 in).
