= Racenisia =

Conservation status
- Least Concern (IUCN 3.1)

Scientific classification
- Kingdom: Animalia
- Phylum: Chordata
- Class: Actinopterygii
- Order: Gymnotiformes
- Family: Hypopomidae
- Genus: Racenisia; Mago-Leccia, 1994
- Species: R. fimbriipinna

Binomial name
- Racenisia fimbriipinna Mago-Leccia, 1994

Species of fish

Recinisia is a monospecific genus of freshwater ray-finned fish belonging to the family Hypopomidae, the bluntnose knifefishes. The only species in the genus is Racenisia fimbriipinna. This fish is endemic to Venezuela. This species can reach a length of 11.7 centimetres (4.6 in) TL.
