= Hypopomus =

- 98.7 mm

Conservation status
- Least Concern (IUCN 3.1)

Scientific classification
- Kingdom: Animalia
- Phylum: Chordata
- Class: Actinopterygii
- Order: Gymnotiformes
- Family: Hypopomidae
- Genus: Hypopomus; T. N. Gill, 1864
- Species: H. artedi

Binomial name
- Hypopomus artedi (Kaup, 1856)

Synonyms
- Rhamphichthys artedi Kaup, 1856; Rhamphichthys mulleri Kaup, 1856; Hypopomus mulleri (Kaup, 1856); Parupygus litaniensis Hoedeman, 1962; Parupygus savannensis Hoedeman, 1962

Genus of fishes

Hypopomus is a monospecific genus of freshwater ray-finned fish belonging to the family Hypopomidae, the bluntnose knifefishes. The only species in the genus is Hypopomus artedi, a species found in Argentina, Brazil, French Guiana, Guyana and Suriname. This species can reach a length of 50 centimetres (20 in) SL. It can also be found in the aquarium trade.
