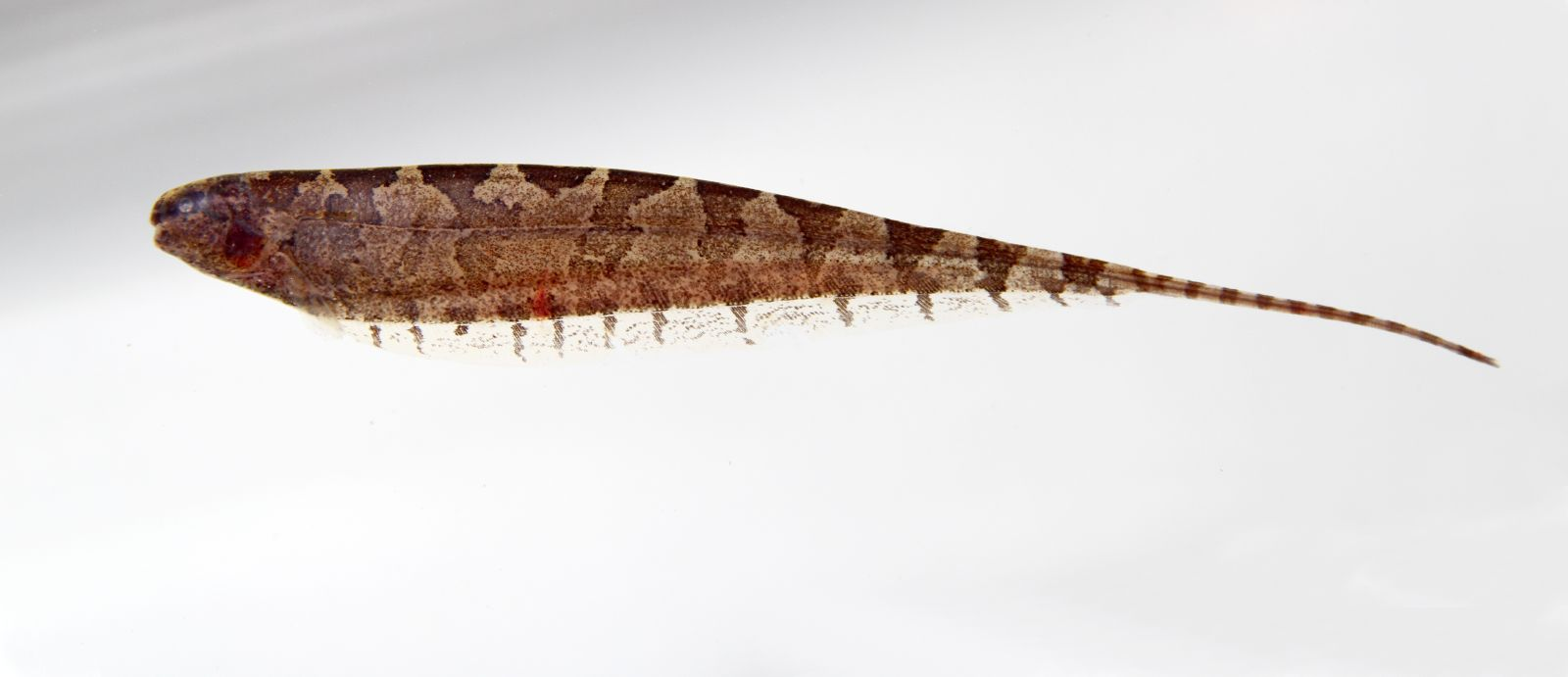

Conservation status
- Least Concern (IUCN 3.1)

Scientific classification
- Kingdom: Animalia
- Phylum: Chordata
- Class: Actinopterygii
- Order: Gymnotiformes
- Family: Rhamphichthyidae
- Genus: Steatogenys
- Species: S. elegans

Binomial name
- Steatogenys elegans (Steindachner, 1880)

Synonyms
- Rhamphichthys (Brachyrhamphichthys) elegans Steindachner, 1880; Brachyhypopomus elegans (Steindachner 1880); Rhamphichthys (Brachyrhamphichthys) mirabilis Steindachner, 1880

= Steatogenys elegans =

Species of fish

Steatogenys elegans, the barred knifefish, is a species of freshwater ray-finned fish belonging to the family Rhamphichthyidae, the sand knifefishes. This fish is found in tropical South America. It is the type species of its genus. It is an electric fish found in a wide range of freshwater habitats in the Amazon, Orinoco and Essequibo river basins. It reaches almost 30 cm (1 ft) in total length.
