= Iracema caiana =

Conservation status
- Least Concern (IUCN 3.1)

Scientific classification
- Kingdom: Animalia
- Phylum: Chordata
- Class: Actinopterygii
- Order: Gymnotiformes
- Family: Rhamphichthyidae
- Genus: Iracema; Triques, 1996
- Species: I. caiana

Binomial name
- Iracema caiana Triques, 1996

Species of fish

Iracema caiana is a species of freshwater ray-finned fish belonging to the family Rhamphichthyidae, the sand knifefishes. This species is endemic to Brazil where it is found in the Jauaperi River basin. It is the only member of its genus.
