= Akawaio penak =

Conservation status
- Endangered (IUCN 3.1)

Scientific classification
- Kingdom: Animalia
- Phylum: Chordata
- Class: Actinopterygii
- Order: Gymnotiformes
- Family: Hypopomidae
- Genus: Akawaio; Maldonado-Ocampo, López-Fernández, Taphorn, Bernard, Crampton & Lovejoy, 2014
- Species: A. penak

Binomial name
- Akawaio penak Maldonado-Ocampo, López-Fernández, Taphorn, Bernard, Crampton & Lovejoy, 2014

Species of fish

Akawaio penak is a species of bluntnose knifefish native to the upper Mazaruni River, Guyana. This species is the only known member of its genus. This species is restricted to the upper Mazaruni River basin in Guyana.
