= Procerusternarchus =

Conservation status
- Least Concern (IUCN 3.1)

Scientific classification
- Kingdom: Animalia
- Phylum: Chordata
- Class: Actinopterygii
- Order: Gymnotiformes
- Family: Hypopomidae
- Genus: Procerusternarchus; Cox Fernandes, Nogueira & Alves-Gomes, 2014
- Species: P. pixuna

Binomial name
- Procerusternarchus pixuna Cox Fernandes, Nogueira & Alves-Gomes, 2014

Species of fish

Procerusternarchus is a monospecific genus of freshwater ray-finned fish belonging to the family Hypopomidae, the bluntnose knifefishes. The only species in the genus is Procerusternarchus pixuna. This fish is endemic to Amazonas, Brazil where it occurs in several tributaries of the Rio Negro.
