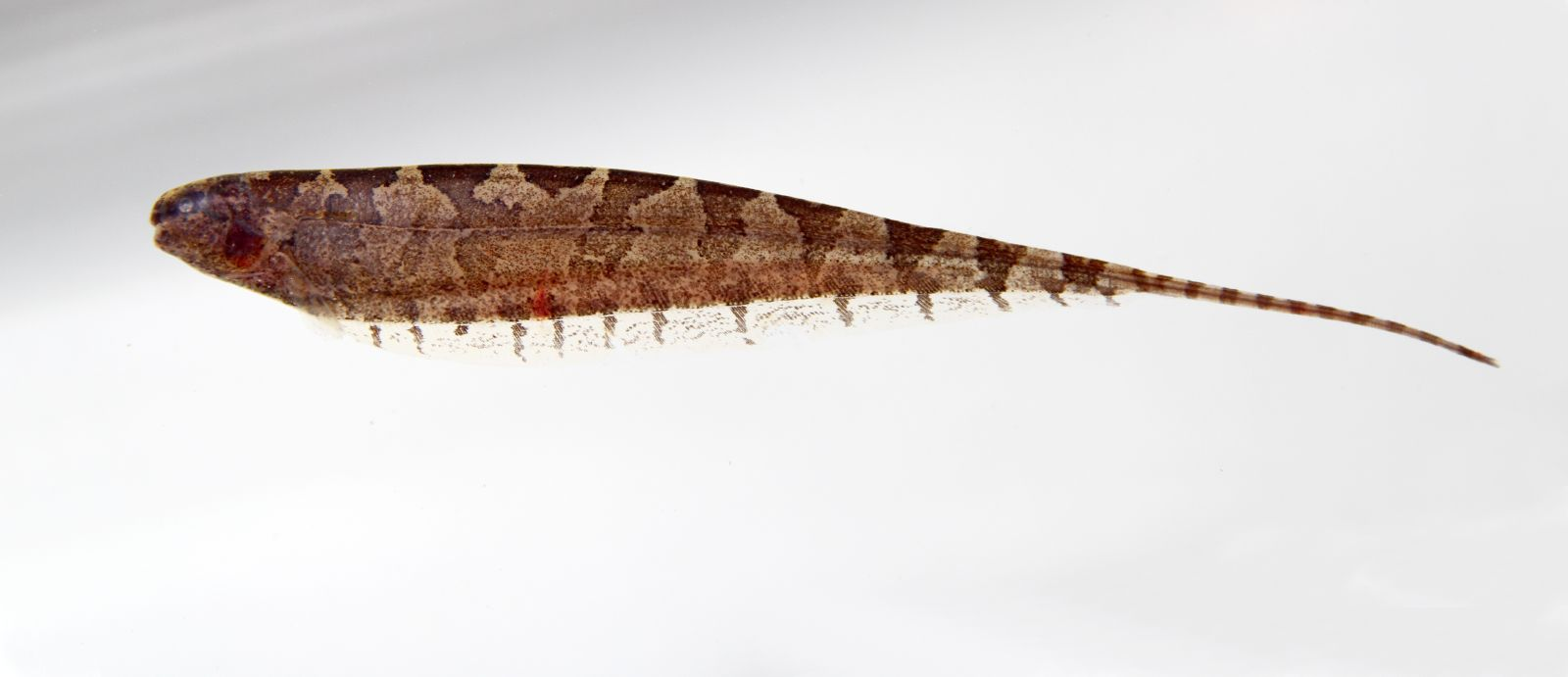
- Steatogenys elegans

Scientific classification
- Kingdom: Animalia
- Phylum: Chordata
- Class: Actinopterygii
- Order: Gymnotiformes
- Family: Rhamphichthyidae
- Genus: Steatogenys; Boulenger, 1898

Type species
- Rhamphichthys (Brachyrhamphichthys) elegans Steindachner, 1880

= Steatogenys =

Genus of fishes

Steatogenys is a genus of freshwater ray-finned fishes belonging to the family Rhamphichthyidae, the sand kinifefishes. The fishes in this genus are found in the Amazon, Orinoco and Essequibo river basins in tropical South America. The widespread and common S. elegans is found in a wide range of habitats, from the shallow essentially static waters such as floodplain lakes to fast-flowing rivers as deep as 50 m (160 ft). The two remaining species are less common and widespread, with S. duidae found mainly in small streams running through terra firme forests (forest that does not flood, unlike várzea) and S. ocellatus among submerged roots and branches in static or slow-flowing blackwater habitats. All three are regularly found among vegetation in floating meadows, a habitat that often contains little oxygen, but they are well-adapted to this.

They are well-camouflaged and brown in color with a barred pattern. They resemble the related Hypopygus, but are larger, reaching up to 20–40 cm (8–16 in) in total length depending on the exact species of Steatogenys. They feed on invertebrates such as aquatic insect larvae and small shrimp.

== Taxonomy and species ==
Steatogenys has traditionally been included in the family Hypopomidae, but a comprehensive molecular study from 2015 showed it belongs in Rhamphichthyidae, and this has been followed by recent authorities.

There are currently three recognized species in this genus:

- Steatogenys duidae (La Monte, 1929) (Brazil, Venezuela)
- Steatogenys elegans (Steindachner, 1880) (barred knifefish) (Bolivia, Brazil, Colombia, Ecuador, Guyana, Peru, Venezuela)
- Steatogenys ocellatus Crampton, Thorsen & Albert, 2004 (Brazil, Peru)
