= Iracema do Oeste =

Coordinates: 24.4278°S 53.355°W

- Municipality
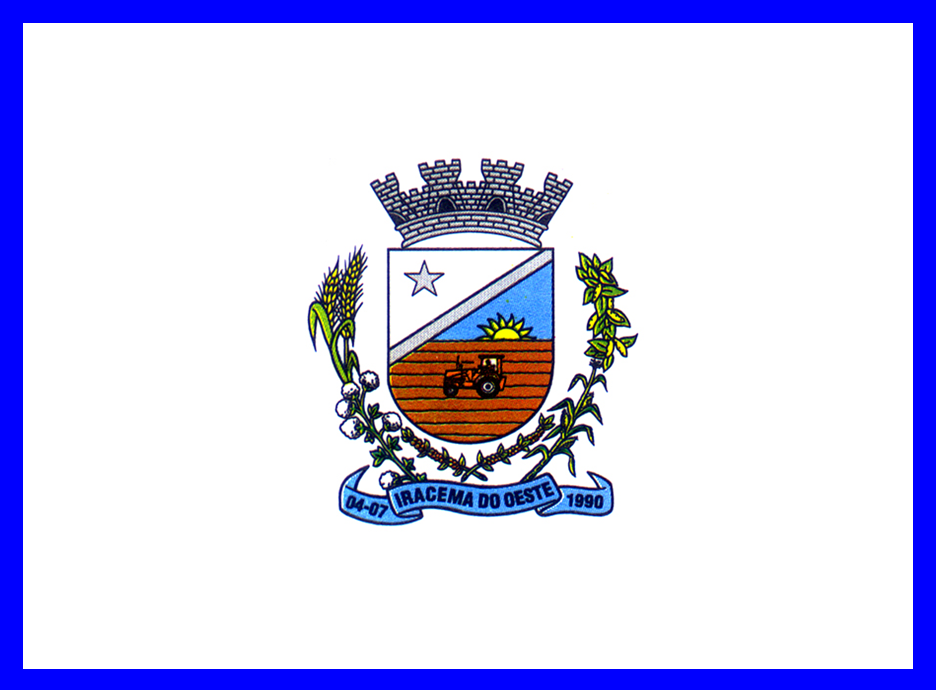
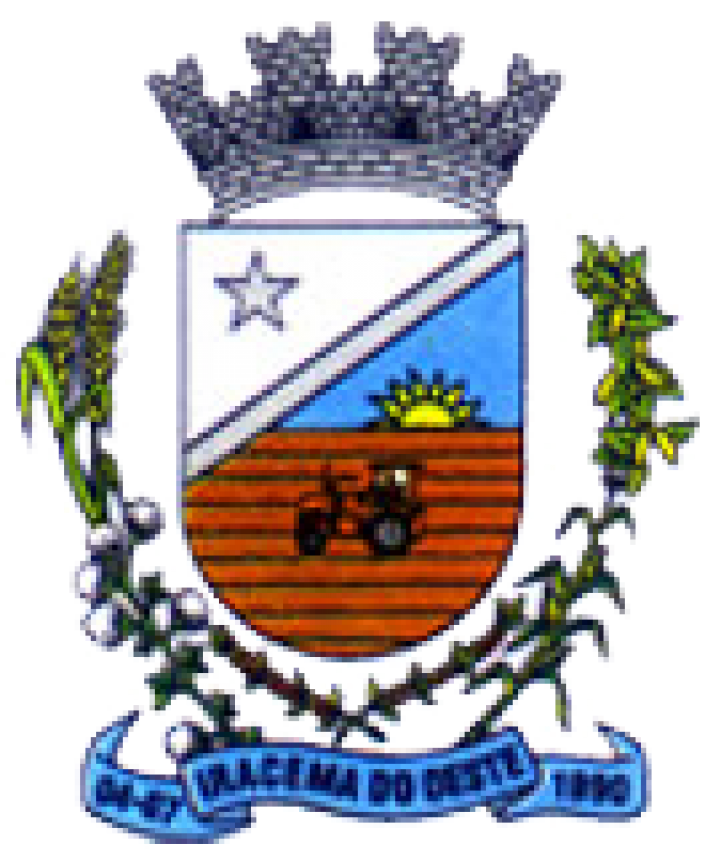
- Flag Coat of arms
- Interactive map of Iracema do Oeste
- Country: Brazil
- Region: Southern
- State: Paraná
- Mesoregion: Oeste Paranaense

Population (2020)
  - Total: 2,251
- Time zone: UTC−3 (BRT)

Iracema do Oeste is a municipality in the state of Paraná in the Southern Region of Brazil.

== See also ==
- List of municipalities in Paraná
