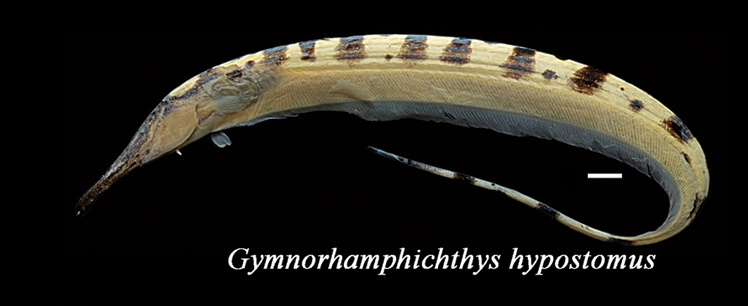

Scientific classification
- Domain: Eukaryota
- Kingdom: Animalia
- Phylum: Chordata
- Class: Actinopterygii
- Order: Gymnotiformes
- Family: Rhamphichthyidae
- Genus: Gymnorhamphichthys; M. M. Ellis, 1912

Type species
- Gymnorhamphichthys hypostomus M. M. Ellis, 1912

Synonyms
- Urumaria Miranda-Ribeiro, 1920

= Gymnorhamphichthys =

Genus of fishes

Gymnorhamphichthys is a genus of South American sand knifefishes found in the Amazon, Araguaia, Orinoco and Río de la Plata basins, as well as rivers in the Guianas. They inhabit both small streams and large rivers, but usually over a sandy bottom. During the night they swim head-down over the sandy bottom to locate small invertebrate prey like insect larvae and during the day they rest buried under the sand.

They are generally very pale (almost whitish, light silvery, light yellowish or semi-translucent), and have a pattern of dark bars/spots or a dark line along the side of the body. Their snout is relatively long, thin and tubular. Gymnorhamphichthys are small knifefish with the largest species reaching up to about 23 cm (9 in) in total length.

== Species ==
These are the currently recognized species in this genus:

- Gymnorhamphichthys bogardusi Lundberg, 2005
- Gymnorhamphichthys britskii T. P. Carvalho, C. S. Ramos & Albert, 2011
- Gymnorhamphichthys hypostomus M. M. Ellis, 1912
- Gymnorhamphichthys rondoni (A. Miranda-Ribeiro, 1920)
- Gymnorhamphichthys rosamariae Schwassmann, 1989
