= Exastilithoxus hoedemani =

Conservation status
- Least Concern (IUCN 3.1)

Scientific classification
- Kingdom: Animalia
- Phylum: Chordata
- Class: Actinopterygii
- Order: Siluriformes
- Family: Loricariidae
- Genus: Exastilithoxus
- Species: E. hoedemani

Binomial name
- Exastilithoxus hoedemani Isbrücker & Nijssen, 1985

Species of fish

Exastilithoxus hoedemani is a species of freshwater ray-finned fish belonging to the family Loricariidae, the suckermouth armoured catfishes, and the subfamily Hypostominae, the suckermouth catfishes. This catfish is endemic to Brazil where it occurs in the Maurauiá River in the Rio Negro basin. This species grows to a standard length of 5.1 cm (2.0 in).
