= Microsternarchus =

Scientific classification
- Kingdom: Animalia
- Phylum: Chordata
- Class: Actinopterygii
- Order: Gymnotiformes
- Family: Hypopomidae
- Genus: Microsternarchus; Fernández-Yépez, 1968

Type species
- Microsternarchus bilineatus Fernández-Yépez 1968

Genus of fishes

Microsternarchus is a genus of bluntnose knifefish that is found in creeks and streams, often in areas with submerged vegetation, roots and leaf litter, in the Amazon, Orinoco, Essequibo–Rupununi and Río de la Plata basins in South America. The two recognized species are both small knifefish, with the largest being M. bilineatus at up to 12 cm (4.7 in) in total length. The other is M. brevis, which at up to only 5.3 cm (2.1 in) is the world's smallest knifefish. Microsternarchus are very similar to Brachyhypopomus.

== Species ==
There are currently 2 recognized species in this genus:

- Microsternarchus bilineatus Fernández-Yépez, 1968 (Brazil, Venezuela)
- Microsternarchus brevis Cox Fernandes, A. Nogueira, A. D. Williston & Alves-Gomes, 2015 (Brazil)
