= Lithoxus =

Conservation status
- Least Concern (IUCN 3.1)

Scientific classification
- Kingdom: Animalia
- Phylum: Chordata
- Class: Actinopterygii
- Order: Siluriformes
- Family: Loricariidae
- Subfamily: Hypostominae
- Genus: Lithoxus; C. H. Eigenmann, 1910
- Species: L. lithoides

Binomial name
- Lithoxus lithoides C. H. Eigenmann, 1912

Monospecific genus of fish

Lithoxus is a monospecific genus of freshwater ray-finned fish belonging to the family Loricariidae, the suckermouth armoured catfishes, and the subfamily Hypostominae, the suckermouth catfishes. The only species in the genus is Lithoxus lithoides. This catfish is found in Brazil, Guyana and Suriname.

== Taxonomy ==
Lithoxus was first proposed as a genus in 1910 by the German-born American ichthyologist Carl H. Eigenmann when he used the name in a footnote, which has subsequently been accepted as a valid description. Eigenmann published his description of L. lithoides in 1912 giving its type locality as Amatuk in Guyana. Some authorities regard this genus as being within the tribe Ancistrini of the subfamily Hypostominae, but Eschmeyer's Catalog of Fishes does not recognise tribes within the subfamily Hypostominae.

In 2018, a phylogenetic study revealed that there was a deep split between Lithoxus lithoides, the type species of the genus Lithoxus, and all the other species in that genus. Consequently, the genus Paralithoxus, originally proposed in 1982 as a subgenus of Lithoxus and which was synonymized with Lithoxus in 1990, was resurrected. Alongside P. boujardi, all the Lithoxus species excluding L. lithoides were moved to Paralithoxus.

Lithoxus is supported as a monophyletic sister to Exastilithoxus. Together, these two genera form a well-supported clade.

== Etymology ==
Lithoxus combines lithos, which means "stone", with oxus, meaning "sharp". This is an allusion to the stone like shape of this fish and the outer edges of the pectoral fin of males having a dense covering of spines. The specific name lithoides, means "in the form of a stone", again an allusion to the stone-like shape and colour of this species.

== Description ==
Lithoxus has a wide flattened head, with a falt ventral surface. The males develop spines along the outer edge of their pectoral fins. The colour is mottled, sandy or they may be black. This species reaches a standard length of 8.6 cm (3.4 in).

== Distribution and habitat ==
Lithoxus is found in river darianges flowing from the Guiana Plateau in Brazil, Guyana and Suriname including the Essequibo River and the Courantyne River, it was found in the Uatumã River and the Jatapu River in Brazil, however the Uatumã River population has probably been extirpated by the construction of the Balbina Dam. This catfish is restricted to rapids.
