= Jacobus Johannes Hoedeman =

- Born: 2 October 1917; Haarlem, Netherlands
- Died: 5 July 1982 (aged 64)
- Known for: Taxonomic work on freshwater fishes; popular aquarium literature
- Notable work: Aquariumvissen encyclopedie (1969) (Dutch)
- Scientific career
- Fields: Ichthyology, aquarium hobby literature
- Institutions: Zoological Museum, University of Amsterdam

Jacobus Johannes Hoedeman (2 October 1917 – 5 July 1982) was a Dutch ichthyologist and aquarist who published both scientific papers and popular aquarium literature. Hoedeman also authored and co-authored taxonomic treatments of several freshwater fish taxa.

== Biography ==
Hoedeman was born in Haarlem in 1917 and became active in aquarium keeping from a young age. Later he trained and worked in areas connected to natural history and fish collections.

After his education, Hoedeman served as a staff member associated with the Zoological Museum, University of Amsterdam, and produced museum catalogues and lists of type specimens as part of his curatorial duties and taxonomic activity. He published numerous papers in ichthyological journals (including Beaufortia) and in hobbyist periodicals, bridging the aquatic hobbyist community and formal ichthyological research.

Along with others, Hoedeman contributed to the widely used Dutch aquarium reference named the Aquariumvissen Encyclopedie.

== Legacy ==
Several fish taxa have been named in Hoedeman's honour (such as the armored catfish Exastilithoxus hoedemani and the knifefish Hypopygus hoedemani), and his taxonomic and museum work is cited in later ichthyological literature and databases such as Eschmeyer’s Catalog of Fishes.

A detailed memorial article by F. F. Schmidt, entitled "Jacobus Johannes Hoedeman, aquariaan en ichtyoloog" was published in the Dutch journal Het Aquarium in September 1983, summarizing his life and contributions to both science and the aquarium community.
