= Exastilithoxus =

Scientific classification
- Kingdom: Animalia
- Phylum: Chordata
- Class: Actinopterygii
- Order: Siluriformes
- Family: Loricariidae
- Subfamily: Hypostominae
- Genus: Exastilithoxus; Isbrücker & Nijssen, 1979

Type species
- Pseudacanthicus (Lithoxus) fimbriatus Steindachner, 1915

Genus of fishes

Exastilithoxus is a genus of freshwater ray-finned fish belonging to the family Loricariidae, the suckermouth armoured catfishes, and the subfamily Hypostominae, the suckermouth catfishes. These catfishes are found in South America.

== Species ==
Exastilithoxus contains the following valid species:

- Exastilithoxus fimbriatus (Steindachner, 1915)
- Exastilithoxus hoedemani Isbrücker & Nijssen, 1985

== Appearance and anatomy ==
Exastilithoxus species are small, cylindrical loricariids.

These species exhibit a round lower lip with fleshy barbels. Color pattern is generally mottled and dark brown with paler areas under and just posterior to the dorsal fin. The abdomen is white, fins are mottled, and the ventral surface of the caudal peduncle is colored as the sides, but slightly lighter. Like other loricariids, the body is armored, however the abdomen is naked.

== Ecology ==
Exastilithoxus species are unique among loricariids in that they subsist entirely on insect larvae.
