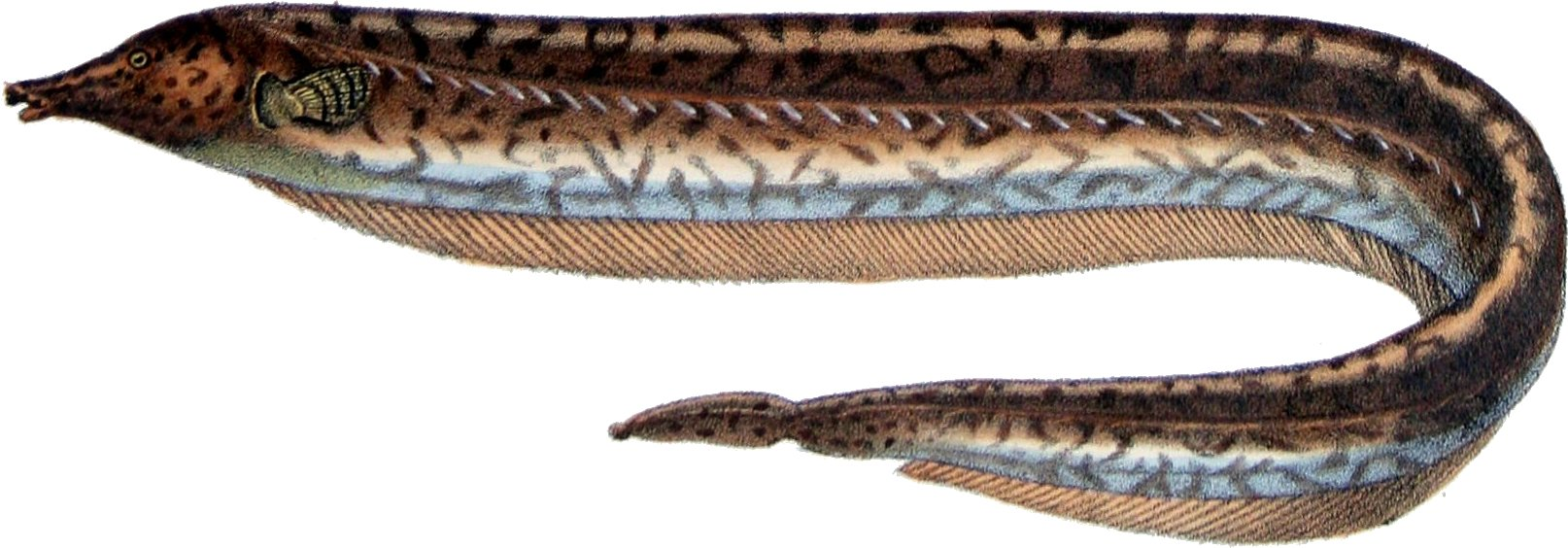
- Rhamphichthys marmoratus

Scientific classification
- Kingdom: Animalia
- Phylum: Chordata
- Class: Actinopterygii
- Clade: Siluriphysi
- Order: Gymnotiformes
- Family: Rhamphichthyidae; Regan, 1911

Genera
- See text

= Rhamphichthyidae =

Family of fishes

Sand knifefish are freshwater electric fish of the family Rhamphichthyidae, from freshwater habitats in South America.

Just like most part of the members of the Gymnotiformes group, they also have elongated and compressed bodies and electric organs. The long anal fin actually extends from before the pectoral fins to the tip of the tail. There is no dorsal fin. Teeth are absent in the oral jaws and the snout is very long and tubular. The nostrils are very close together. This group is sometimes known as the tubesnout knifefishes for this reason.

They are nocturnal and burrow in the sand during the day.

This family contains one of the smallest gymnotiforms, Hypopygus hoedemani, which reaches a maximum total length of 5.9 cm (2.3 in). Other species of Steatogenys can range up to 40–50 cm (16–20 in) in length.

== Genera ==
The following taxonomy is based on Eschmeyer's Catalog of Fishes:

- Gymnorhamphichthys Ellis, 1912
- Hypopygus Hoedeman, 1962
- Iracema Triques, 1996
- Rhamphichthys J. P. Müller & Troschel, 1846
- Steatogenys Boulenger, 1898

Hypopygus and Steatogenys were previously placed in the Hypopomidae until taxonomic studies identified their affinity with this family.

== See also ==
- List of fish families
