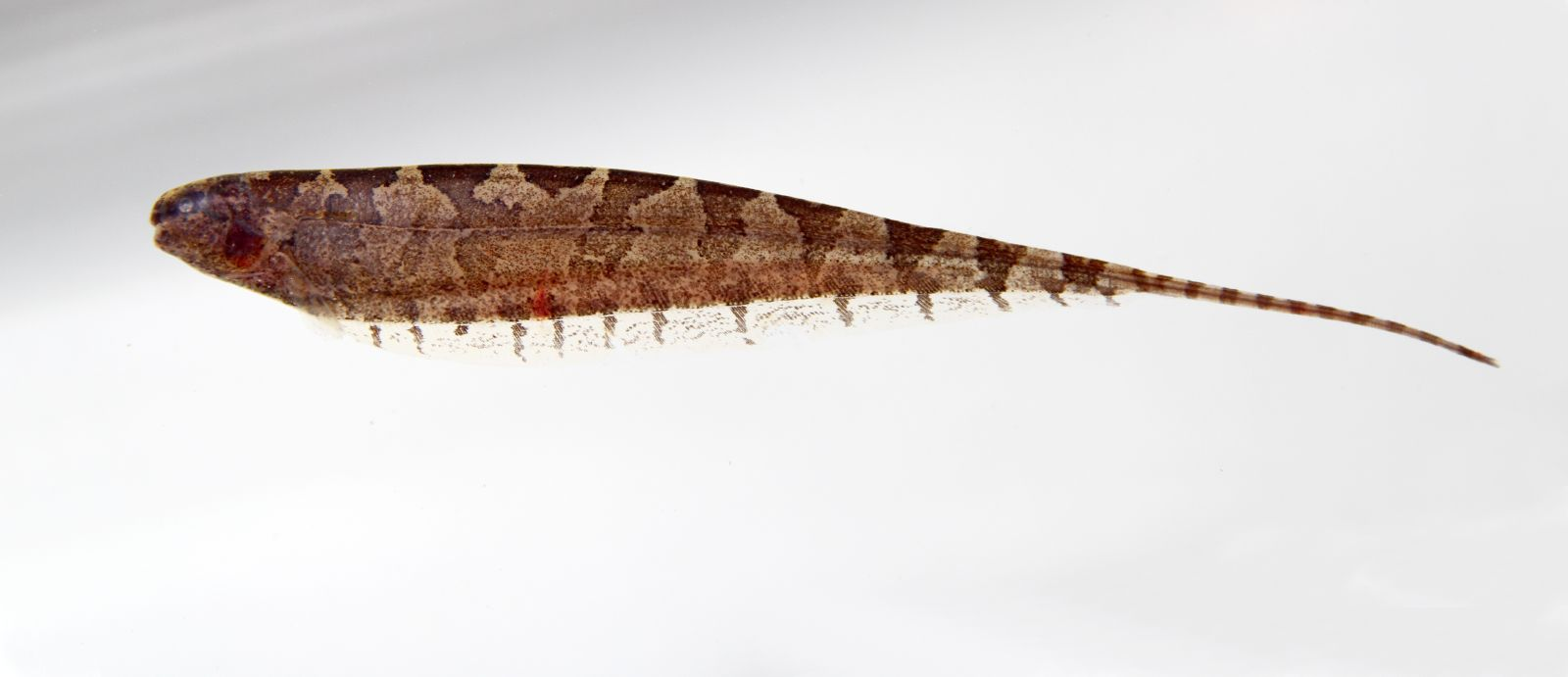
- Steatogenys elegans

Scientific classification
- Kingdom: Animalia
- Phylum: Chordata
- Class: Actinopterygii
- (unranked): Otophysi
- Clade: Siluriphysi
- Order: Gymnotiformes
- Family: Hypopomidae; C. H. Eigenmann 1912

= Hypopomidae =

Family of knifefishes in the order Gymnotiformes

The Hypopomidae are a family of fishes in the order Gymnotiformes known as the bluntnose knifefish. They may also be called grass or leaf knifefishes. These electric fish are not often eaten, of little commercial importance, rarely kept as aquarium fish, and poorly studied; however, species in this family may constitute a significant fraction of the biomass in the areas they inhabit.

These fish originate from fresh water in Panama and South America. The Hypopomidae are confined to the humid neotropics, ranging the Río de la Plata of Argentina (35°S) to the Río Tuira of Panama (8°N). Hypopomids are known from the continental waters of all South American countries except Chile, and are most diverse in the Amazon Basin.

== Description ==
Teeth are absent on the oral jaws. Unlike the closely related Rhamphichthyidae, species of this family do not have a tubular snout, but a blunt, short one. Also, the nostrils are well separated. This family contains one of the smallest gymnotiforms, Microsternarchus brevis, which reaches a maximum total length of 5.3 cm (2.1 in). Most other species in the family are also relatively small, less than 25 cm (10 in) long, although the largest, certain Brachyhypopomus and Hypopomus, are up to 40–50 cm (16–20 in). These fish have extremely small eyes — smaller in diameter than the distance between their nares. The long anal fin originates below or posterior to their pectoral fins, and no caudal fin is present.

The electric organ discharge (EOD) of these fish are multiphasic (usually biphasic), and are produced in distinct pulses. Certain predators, such as catfish and predatory knifefish, are able to detect these EODs and use this to their advantage in finding prey. However, species in the genus Brachyhypopomus restrict the low-frequency spectrum of their electric field close to their bodies, allowing higher frequencies to spread further; this makes it more difficult for predators to detect them.

== Taxonomy and genera ==
The following taxonomy is based on Eschmeyer's Catalog of Fishes:

- Akawaio Maldenado-Ocampo, López-Fernández, Taphorn, C. R. Bernard, Crampton & Lovejoy, 2014
- Brachyhypopomus Mago-Leccia, 1994
- Hypopomus Gill, 1864
- Microsternarchus Fernández-Yépez, 1968
- Procerusternarchus Cox Fernandes, Nogueira & Alves-Gomes, 2014
- Racenisia Mago-Leccia, 1994

Hypopygus and Stetogenys, formerly placed in this family, have been moved into Rhamphichthyidae based on a comprehensive molecular study from 2015.
