= Marinus Boeseman =

Dutch ichthyologist (1916–2006)

- Born: 22 June 1916; Enkhuizen, Netherlands
- Died: 14 July 2006 (aged 90)
- Education: Leiden University
- Known for: Studies on South American catfish and Japanese ichthyofauna
- Scientific career
- Fields: Ichthyology
- Workplaces: Leiden University, Rijksmuseum van Natuurlijke Historie
- Author abbrev. (zoology): Boeseman

Marinus Boeseman (22 June 1916 – 14 July 2006) was a Dutch ichthyologist.

== Biography ==
Boeseman was born in Enkhuizen, the Netherlands. Gifted artistically, he initially considered studying art after finishing school but ultimately chose to pursue biology at Leiden University in 1935.

As a student, he published his first scientific paper—on the behavior of the bitterling (Rhodeus sericeus)—together with one of his professors. Before beginning his doctoral dissertation, he participated in a research project at the Rijksmuseum van Natuurlijke Historie (now Naturalis Biodiversity Center) in Leiden, examining Japanese fish species previously described by Heinrich Bürger and Philipp Franz von Siebold. His doctoral thesis on this material was completed in 1943.

Boeseman also worked for a time in the museum’s entomology department, focusing on earwigs (Dermaptera).

During World War II, Boeseman was arrested for his activities in the Dutch resistance against the Nazi regime and imprisoned in the Dachau concentration camp until 1945. His imprisonment took a toll on his health, and although he had submitted his dissertation in 1943, he did not defend it until 1947. The work, which compared and described all Japanese ichthyological specimens in the RMNH collection, became a standard reference. Boeseman later referred to it as “the sin of my youth [...] written when I thought I knew everything”.

As curator of the ichthyological department at Leiden University, Boeseman conducted numerous research expeditions to South America between the 1950s and 1970s. He published extensively on the region’s fish fauna and became a renowned expert on South American armored catfish (family Loricariidae).

Between 1977 and 1979, he made several visits to Leningrad (now Saint Petersburg) and Kraków to study drawings of northeastern Brazilian animals made by Albert Eckhout. Boeseman retired in 1981 but remained associated with the RMNH for many years thereafter.

== Legacy ==
Several fish taxa have been named in his honor, including the genus Boesemania, the rainbowfish species Melanotaenia boesemani, and the catfish Corydoras boesemani.
