= Nile =

Major river in northeast Africa

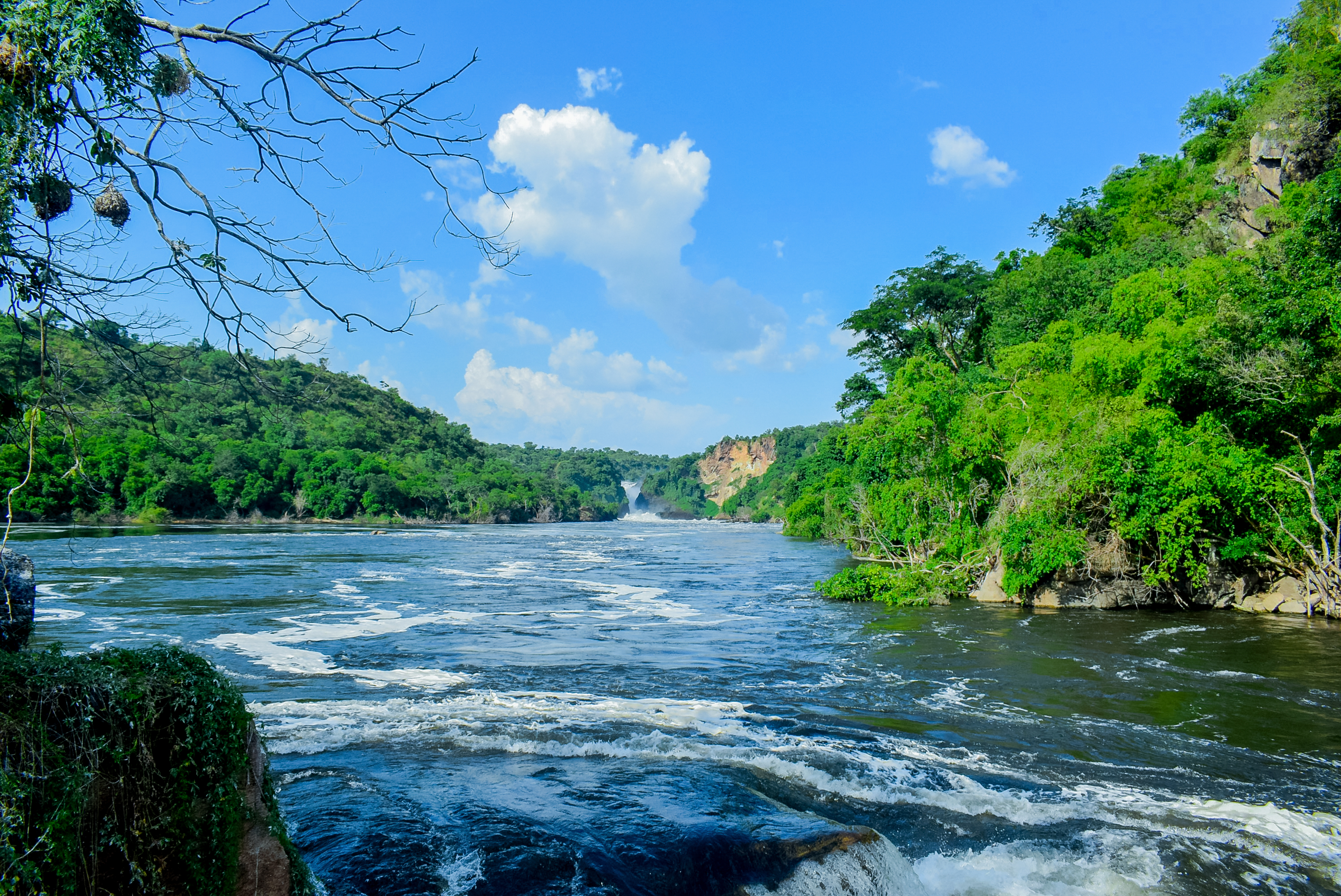
- The Nile near Murchison Falls

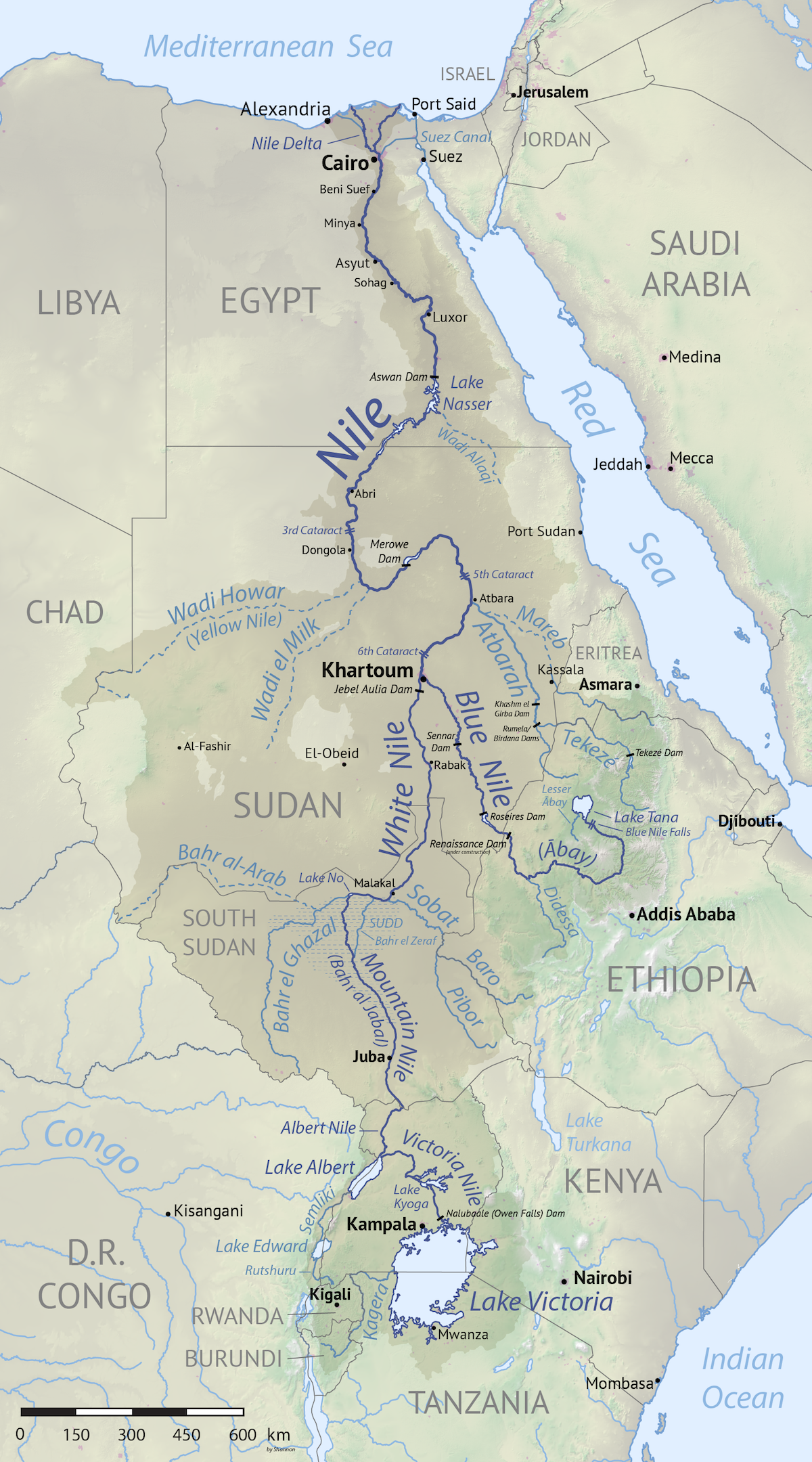

Location
- Countries: Burundi, DR Congo, Egypt, Eritrea, Ethiopia, Kenya, Rwanda, South Sudan, Sudan, Tanzania, Uganda
- Major cities: Bahir Dar, Jinja, Juba, Wad Madani, Khartoum, Omdurman, Aswan, Luxor, Qena, Sohag, Asyut, Cairo, Mansoura, Damietta

Physical characteristics
- Source: Rukarara River, Rwanda (Note: An approximate source location was initially determined in 1969 by a group of researchers from Waseda University. In 2006, a group of adventurers rediscovered that location, and placed a marker on a nearby tree (2°16′56″S 29°19′53″E) which is now a minor tourist sight. In 2009, academics used satellite imagery to refine the location of the source, placing it at a spring (2°19′35″S 29°21′30″E) several km from the 1969/2006 location.)
  - coordinates: 2°19′35″S 29°21′30″E
  - elevation: 2,539 m (8,330 ft)
- Mouth: Mediterranean Sea
  - coordinates: 30°10′21″N 31°8′24″E
  - elevation: 0 m (0 ft)
- Length: 7,088 km (4,404 mi) (Note: The 7,088 km value for the length of the Nile is based on the Liu 2009 study. This study measured ten rivers around the world using the same methodology: the length was measured along the centerline of the river using satellite imagery. The imagery was collected during the years 1999 to 2002. The lengths of all rivers vary over time, as the river changes course, sources are refined, deltas change size, or new measurement methodologies are developed. The title of longest river is somewhat controversial. Sources stating that the Nile is the longest river include Liu 2009; Fierro & Nyer 2007, p. 5.35; Talbot & Williams 2009, p. 39; Dumont 2009, p. 1; and Sutcliffe 2009, p. 336.)
- Basin size: 2,927,843 km^{2}
- Discharge
  - location: Aswan, Egypt
  - average: 2,757 m^{3}/sec (Note: Discharge rate is 2,757 m^{3}/sec (87 km^{3}/yr) at Aswan. Between Aswan and the Mediterranean, Egypt withdraws large amounts of water for irrigation, leading to lower discharge values downstream. Near Cairo, the discharge is 1,251 m^{3}/sec (40 km^{3}/yr). The discharge from the delta into the Mediterranean Sea is only 150 m^{3}/sec (5 km^{3}/yr). These values were measured before construction of the Grand Ethiopian Renaissance Dam.)

The Nile is a major north-flowing river in northeast Africa which empties into the Mediterranean Sea. At 7,088 kilometers (4,404 mi) long, it is the longest river in the world, although the volume of water it carries is much smaller than other major rivers such as the Amazon or the Congo. The Nile has played a central role in the environmental, economic, and cultural history of Africa for millennia.

The Nile has two major tributaries: the White Nile and the Blue Nile. The White Nile is longer and is considered to be the headwaters, yet the Blue Nile contributes over twice the water volume of the White Nile. The White Nile begins near Lake Victoria and flows through Uganda and South Sudan, while the Blue Nile begins near Lake Tana in Ethiopia and flows into Sudan from the southeast. The two rivers meet at the Sudanese capital, Khartoum. From there, the Nile flows north through the Nubian Desert to Egypt's capital, Cairo, and finally empties into the Mediterranean Sea near Alexandria, where it has formed a large river delta.

Geologically, the Nile is a young river, having followed its present course for about 15,000 years. Its drainage basin extends across eleven countries. Most of the water in the Nile comes from rainfall in the upstream countries Ethiopia, Kenya, Tanzania, and Uganda. Downstream countries – Egypt, Sudan, and South Sudan – are primarily desert and withdraw river water for irrigation. Other countries that lie wholly or partly in the Nile Basin are Burundi, the Democratic Republic of the Congo, Eritrea, and Rwanda.

The Nile was the foundation of the Ancient Egyptian civilization, which relied on the river for nearly every aspect of life. The annual flooding of the river deposited nutrient-rich silt along the riverbanks. This soil supported crops that enabled a sophisticated society to thrive in an otherwise inhospitable desert. The Nile facilitated trade, communication, transportation, and governance. South (upstream) of the second Nile cataract lay Nubia, the historical home of the ancient Kerma culture and the Kushite Empire. Many Europeans were fascinated by the Nile, and their explorations around Lake Victoria in the late 19th century located the source of the river. Among the cultures that live along the Nile in the modern era are the Nilotic peoples, semi-nomadic cattle herders who practice nomadic pastoralism, moving their cattle seasonally in response to the Nile's floods.

In the modern era, the Nile plays a critical role in the economies of Egypt and Sudan, which rely on it to irrigate extensive croplands. Since the late 20th century, over a dozen dams have been built in the Nile Basin to provide for irrigation and to generate electricity. The dams have altered the river's annual flood cycle and restricted the transport of silt downstream, causing the Nile Delta to shrink. Some dams – such as the Aswan High Dam and Grand Ethiopian Renaissance Dam – have been the source of international political disputes about water scarcity, safety, food security, and forced displacement of peoples.

== Names and etymology ==
The English word "Nile" is derived from the Latin Nilus and the Ancient Greek Νεῖλος (Neilos), which possibly originated from the Semitic term naḥal, meaning 'river'.

Egyptian hieroglyphs for jtrw,
the word for 'river' or 'Nile': (Note: Other hieroglyphs for 'river' are presented in Faulkner 1964, p. 33 and Allen 2000, pp. 21, 101.)

M17 X1 D21 G43 N35 N35 N35

In the ancient Egyptian language, the same word was used for 'Nile' and 'river': jtrw. Egyptians called their country kmt meaning 'black', in reference to the dark color of the Nile floodwaters as they carried sediment from upriver. The English name "Blue Nile" is a translation of the Arabic name Al-Baḥr Al-Azraq.

In the modern era, the river goes by several names within the Nile Basin. In Egypt, it is referred to as Al-Nīl, Baḥr Al-Nīl or Nahr Al-Nīl. In South Sudan, it is sometimes referred to by the Arabic Baḥr el-Jebel, بحر الجبل, literally 'Mountain River'. In Uganda, the speakers of Luganda use the name Kiyira. Some Nubian peoples of Egypt and Sudan use the Nobiin name Áman Dawū ('Great Water').

Several tributaries (smaller rivers that merge into the Nile) and segments of the river incorporate "Nile" in their names, including the following:

- Albert Nile – Segment of the White Nile flowing north from Lake Albert to Nimule
- Black Nile – An alternate name for the Atbarah River
- Blue Nile – One of the two major tributaries of the Nile
- Kyoga Nile – Segment of the White Nile from Lake Kyoga to Lake Albert
- Main Nile – Segment of the Nile downstream from the confluence of Blue Nile and White Nile
- Mountain Nile – Segment of the White Nile from the mountains of Uganda to the plains of South Sudan
- Victoria Nile – Segment of the White Nile from Lake Victoria to Lake Kyoga
- White Nile – One of the two major tributaries of the Nile
- Yellow Nile – The Wadi Howar, remnant of an ancient tributary that dried up several thousand years ago

== Sources ==
The Nile has six cataracts (Note: Some of the cataracts have been submerged by human-made reservoirs.) and several sources.

The source of the Nile is a tributary of the Rukarara River, in Nyungwe National Park, Rwanda, at 2°19′35″S 29°21′30″E, at an elevation of 2,539 meters (8,330 ft). (Note: The source of the Nile leads to the Rukarara River, then to the Mwogo River, which joins with the Mbirurume River to form the Nyabarongo River, which leads to the Kagera River, which drains into Lake Victoria.) The source is defined as the starting point of the longest year-round watercourse in the Nile's drainage basin. From this source, the river runs 7,088 kilometers (4,404 mi) to its mouth at the Mediterranean Sea. The distance was measured in 2009 along the centerline of the river using satellite imagery.

The highest sources of the Nile are on the slopes of the Rwenzori Mountains in Uganda. The legendary Mountains of the Moon, described by the Greek astronomer Ptolemy, have been associated with Rwenzori.

The southernmost source of the Nile is in Burundi at one of the heads of the Ruvyironza River, which feeds into the Kagera River. A monument was erected nearby in 1937 by Burkhart Waldecker close to the town of Rutovu, near Mount Kikizi. (Note: The monument erected by Waldecker for the southernmost source is at 3°54′54.0″S 29°50′16.5″E.)

Lake Victoria – shared by Tanzania, Uganda, and Kenya – is sometimes informally described as the source, because it feeds the White Nile from its outflow at Jinja, Uganda. (Note: The Nile exits Lake Victoria at the town of Jinja, which hosts several tourist sights named "source of the Nile" including the Source of the Nile Bridge.) However, some have suggested that the genuine source of the Nile is the rain clouds that are often found above Lake Victoria, because they contribute the vast majority of the lake's water.

The source of the Blue Nile tributary is near the town of Gish Abay, south of Lake Tana. (Note: The source of the Blue Nile is about 75 km south of Lake Tana, at 10°58′12″N 37°11′55″E.)

== Geography ==
The waters of the Nile originate as rainfall in the mountains in the south and east regions of the Nile Basin.

The Nile is a major river in northeast Africa which flows into the Mediterranean Sea. The Nile Basin is all land that drains into the Nile, and it covers 2,927,843 km^{2} – about 10% of the African continent (see adjacent map). Eleven countries are wholly or partially within the basin: Burundi, Democratic Republic of the Congo, Egypt, Eritrea, Ethiopia, Kenya, Rwanda, South Sudan, Sudan, Tanzania, and Uganda. (Note: In 2011, South Sudan broke away from Sudan, becoming the eleventh country in the Nile Basin.) The basin covers a wide variety of climates, ecosystems, and topographies – ranging from arid, sandy deserts in the north, to flat, swampy wetlands in the middle, to rainy, forested mountains in the south.

The basin can be divided into seven regions; five of these regions encompass the longest course of the Nile. Proceeding in a downstream sequence, these five regions are: the African Great Lakes, the Mountain Nile, the White Nile, the main Nile, and the Nile Delta. Two additional regions encompass major tributaries: the Blue Nile and the Atbarah River.

=== African Great Lakes ===
The African Great Lakes region contains the source of the Nile as well as several large lakes that are part of the Nile River system: Lake Victoria, Lake Albert, Lake George, and Lake Edward. The source of the Nile is the Rukarara River within Rwanda's Nyungwe National Park, and it leads to the Kagera River which drains into Lake Victoria. Although it is a large lake – the second-largest freshwater lake in the world (Note: Measured by area, not volume.) – Lake Victoria is relatively shallow, with an average depth of 40 meters (130 ft). The Nile River first assumes the name "Nile" where Lake Victoria empties on its north side: the stretch from there to Lake Albert is called the Victoria Nile. A pair of waterfalls – Ripon Falls and Owen Falls – were located where the Nile exits Lake Victoria, but have both been submerged by the construction of the Nalubaale dam. After Bujagali Falls and Bujagali Power Station, the Victoria Nile empties into Lake Kyoga. After exiting Lake Kyoga, the river is joined by the River Kafu tributary, then passes over Murchison Falls and flows into Lake Albert. Unlike Lake Victoria, Lake Albert is a deep lake surrounded by mountains. The river exits Lake Albert on its north shore, where it is called the Albert Nile; this stretch of the river is relatively flat and broad, and suitable for navigation by steamboats.

=== Mountain Nile ===
The second region of the Nile Basin, proceeding downstream, is the Mountain Nile (Arabic: Bahr al Jabal). This region begins near the town of Nimule, extends to Lake No, and is entirely within South Sudan. After passing through Nimule, the river goes through the Fula Rapids and on to Juba – the capital of South Sudan. After Juba, the Nile passes through the town of Bor, then enters the Sudd, a large swamp located in a flat plain. The incline of the ground in the Sudd is only 1:13,000 rise over run, so the river slows down and widens. Lush vegetation, including sedges, papyrus, and common water hyacinth (an invasive species) clog the waterways and make navigation difficult. At the north edge of the Sudd swamp, the Nile passes through Lake No, a small lake where the Nile is joined by the Bahr el Ghazal River (Arabic: 'gazelle river') – a tributary from the west.

A major tributary in the Mountain Nile region is Bahr el Ghazal which arrives from west Sudan and joins the White Nile at Lake No. The drainage basin of the Bahr el Ghazal River is large – about 860,000 square km – and receives a relatively large amount of rain, but its contribution to the Nile is small compared to other tributaries. (Note: Most precipitation in the Bahr el Ghazal basin is lost to evaporation before reaching the Nile.) Its basin includes Lake Kundi and Lake Keilak. The Bahr el Ghazal passes through the city of Wau, South Sudan: it is a permanent stream east of Wau, but a seasonal stream to the west.

=== White Nile region ===
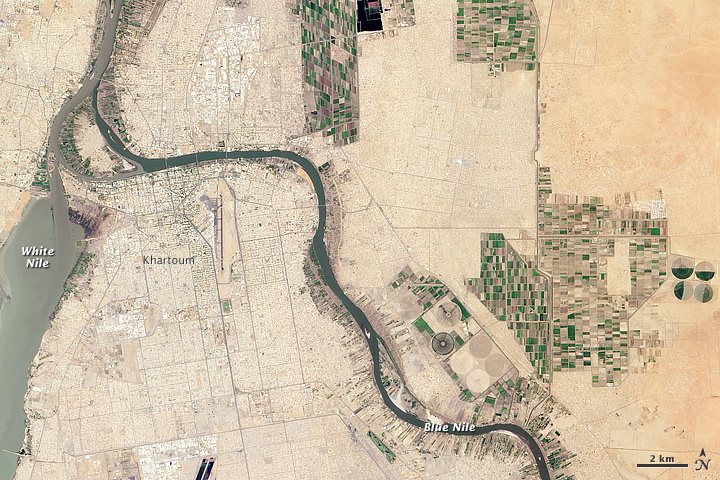
The distinct colors of the White Nile (left) and the Blue Nile (right) are visible where they merge to form the main Nile (top left).

Continuing downstream, the third region of the Nile Basin is the White Nile region (Note: The White Nile region, as defined here, contains only a small portion of the much larger White Nile River.) which includes an 800 kilometers (500 mi) stretch of river from near Malakal to Khartoum, the capital of Sudan. There it is joined by the Blue Nile. This portion of the river is a wide, calm stream with a fringe of swamps on both banks. The river here is shallow and undergoes significant losses due to evaporation.

Where the White Nile merges with the Blue Nile, they are noticeably distinct colors. The White Nile is a lighter shade because the sediment it carries includes a significant amount of quartz and feldspar. This is in contrast to the Blue Nile which carries dark clay sediments originating from Ethiopia's basaltic rocks.

The Sobat River is a tributary which joins the White Nile near the town of Malakal (after the Bahr el Ghazal confluence, before the Blue Nile). Its basin – which includes the Machar Marshes – covers about 225,000 square km. The Sobat floods between July and December.

=== Main Nile ===
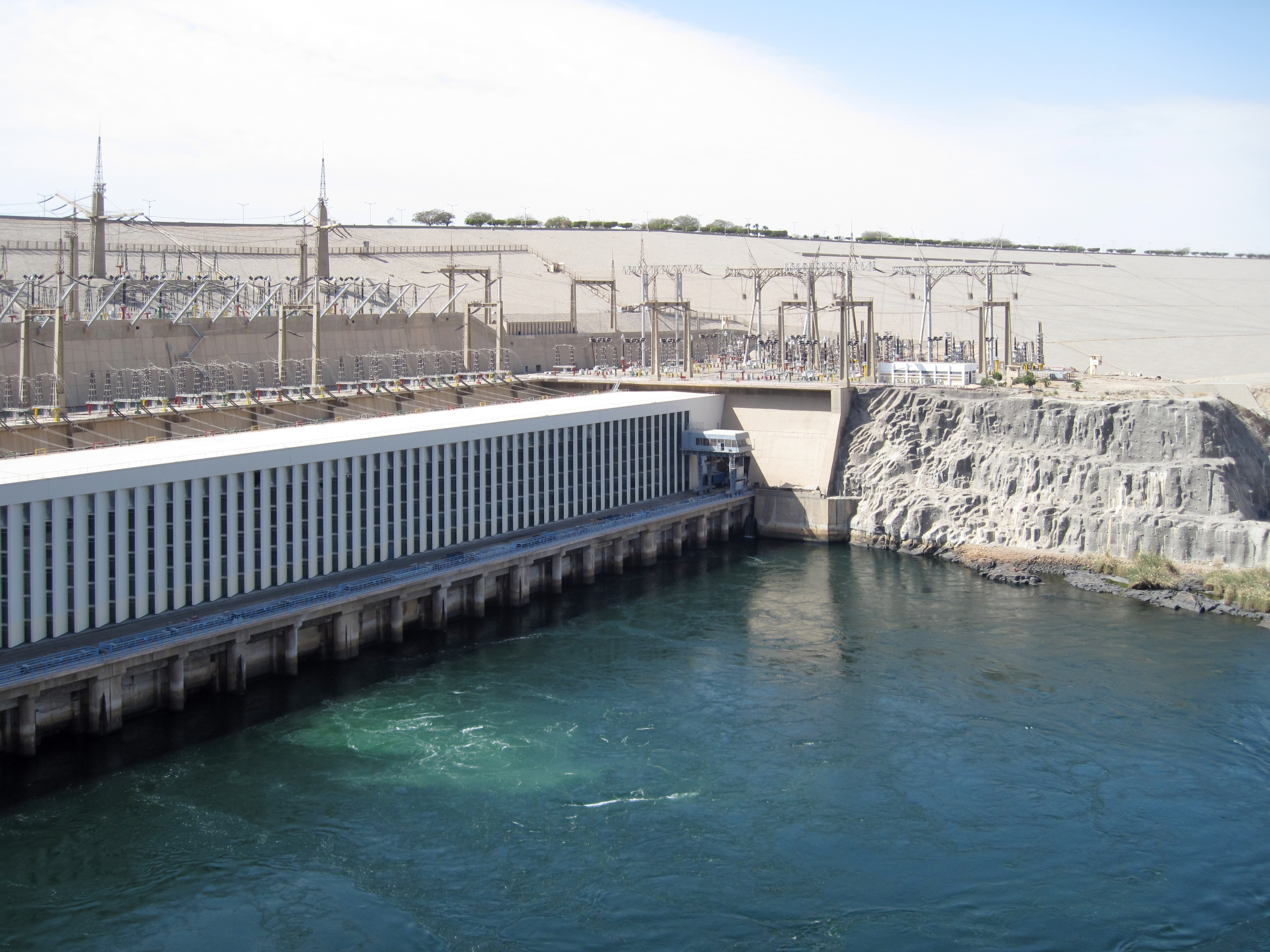
The Aswan High Dam is located on the main Nile near the border between Egypt and Sudan. Its electrical generators have the capacity to produce 2.1 gigawatts.

The fourth region of the Nile Basin – the main Nile (Note: The segment of the Nile between the Blue/White confluence and the Mediterranean is called the main Nile or the Saharan Nile.) – extends from Khartoum to Cairo, the capital of Egypt. This stretch has a relatively uniform width and depth: about 500 meters (1,600 ft) wide and 10 meters (33 ft) deep at its deepest point (when not in flood). Soon after leaving Khartoum, the river enters the Sabaloka Game Reserve and goes through large, powerful rapids that are impassable by boat. This is the sixth (and furthest upstream) of the six cataracts of the Nile. The Atbarah River – a major tributary – joins the Nile, which then follows a large S-shaped curve to the west. Four more cataracts (numbered 5, 4, 3, and 2) are encountered in this large S-curve, which render the river unnavigable; although ships may travel in certain calm stretches between the cataracts. The river then enters a reservoir: Lake Nasser. This lake – the world's second-largest human-made lake – was formed when the Aswan High Dam was built in Egypt, and inundates more than 480 kilometers (300 mi) of the Nile. The Aswan Low Dam – older and smaller than the High Dam – lies beneath the Aswan High Dam, near the location of the first Nile cataract (now submerged). From these dams, the Nile flows about 800 kilometers (500 mi) through a limestone plateau, bordered by large amounts of irrigated farmland, until it reaches Cairo.

=== Nile Delta ===
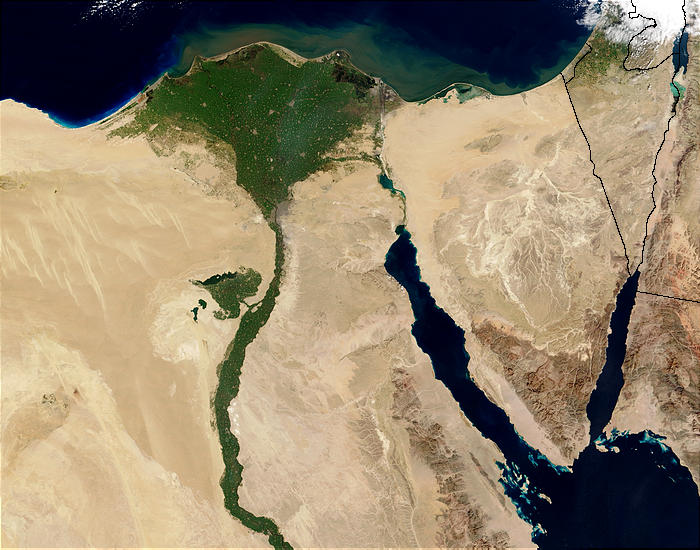
The Nile Delta is the large triangular vegetated region at the top of this photograph, where the river empties into the Mediterranean Sea.

The fifth, and final, region encompassing the Nile River is the Nile Delta, a large triangular river delta (about 22,000 km^{2}) that extends from Cairo to the Mediterranean Sea. The river splits into two major distributaries (channels) within the delta: the Rosetta branch and the Damietta branch. The total volume of the delta (including the submerged portions) is about 150,000 km^{3}. The delta was created over several million years, built-up from sediment carried down the river from upstream. Since the Aswan High Dam was completed in 1970, the delta has begun to shrink because of erosion from currents in the Mediterranean Sea. In the past, erosion was balanced by new soils arriving in the form of sediment carried by the river; but the dam traps sediment in its reservoir, preventing new soil from reaching the delta.

=== Blue Nile tributary ===
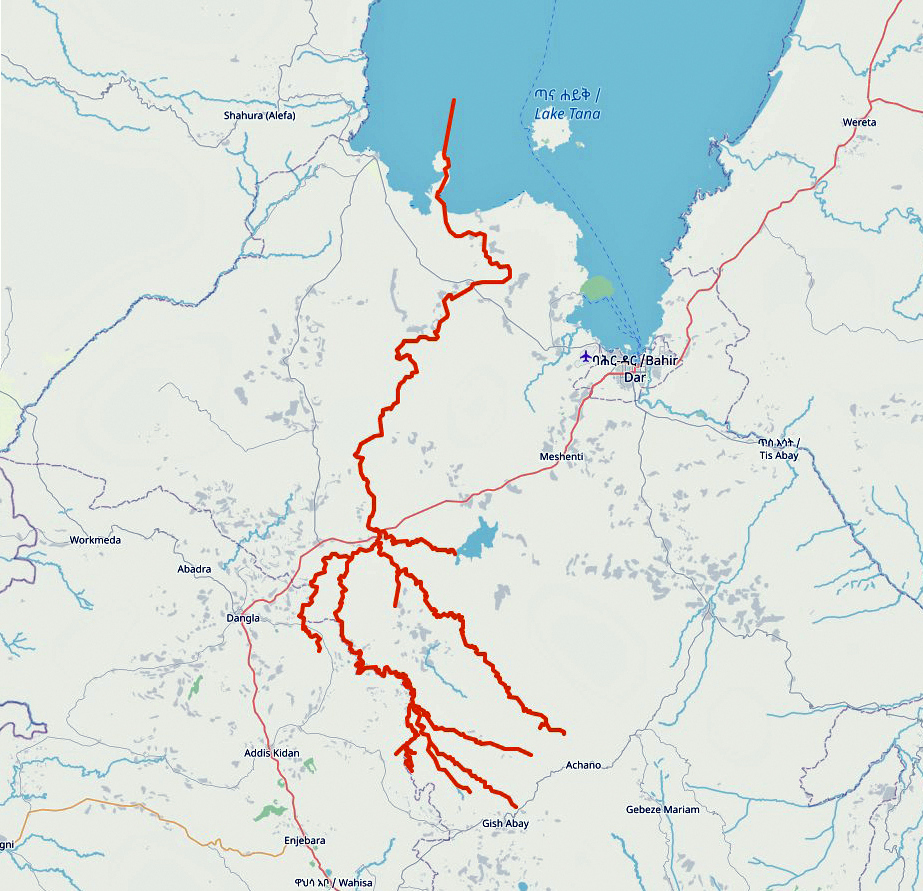
The source of the Blue Nile is Gish Abay at the bottom of the bright line. The river flows north from there to Lake Tana at the top.

The longest course of the Nile – which includes the White Nile tributary – has several other tributaries. The drainage basins of the Blue Nile and the Atbarah comprise the final two regions of the Nile Basin.

The Blue Nile springs from hills in Ethiopia where it originates as a stream named Abay near the town of Gish Abay: Gish is an Amharic word meaning 'source', and Abay is the name of the stream. Gish Abay flows into Lake Tana, a large, shallow lake, which has a single outflow where it adopts the "Blue Nile" name. The river then makes a wide loop: first south, then west through a spectacular gorge 2 kilometers (6,600 ft) deep, then north passing through South Sudan into Sudan, where it joins with the White Nile at Khartoum to form the main Nile. Along its course, the Blue Nile generates electricity at several hydropower plants, including the Tis Abay hydropower project at the Blue Nile Falls, the Grand Ethiopian Renaissance Dam near the border between Ethiopia and South Sudan, the Roseires Dam near the town of Ad Damazin, and the Sennar Dam. The size of the Blue Nile's drainage basin is over 306,000 square km.

=== Atbarah tributary ===
The Atbarah River is a tributary of the Nile which arises in northern Ethiopia, and joins the Nile about 320 kilometers (200 mi) north of Khartoum. Its drainage basin covers over 204,000 square km. The Atbarah has a heavy flow during and following the monsoon season in Ethiopia (summer and fall), but can dry up in the winter and spring. Despite the intermittent nature of the river, it provides more than 10% of the total annual flow of the Nile. Dams on the Atbarah include the Khashm el-Girba Dam, the Upper Atbara and Setit Dam Complex, and the Tekezé Dam (on the Tekezé River tributary).

== Hydrology ==
The flow of the Nile River varies widely throughout the year. Rates (m^{3}/sec) measured at Dongola on the main Nile. (Note: Data does not include impacts of the Grand Ethiopian Renaissance Dam, completed in 2025)

=== Flow and floods ===
Although the Nile is the longest river in the world, it does not have the largest discharge. Its flow – about 87 km^{3} per year – is small compared to other major rivers. The Nile's discharge is only about 1% of the Amazon, 6% of the Congo, and 12% of the Yangtze. (Note: Comparisons are using discharge of the Nile as measured at Aswan. The Nile's discharge into the Mediterranean Sea is far less.)

The annual contributions to the main Nile from the three primary tributaries are: 54% from the Blue Nile, 32% from the White Nile (including contributions from the Bahr el Ghazal and Sobat tributaries), and 14% from the Atbarah. The highlands of the White Nile and Blue Nile both experience seasonal rain, but the White Nile's flow into the main Nile is much more constant than the Blue Nile. This is due to the many lakes and wetlands on the White Nile, which moderate the cyclic effects of seasonal rainfall. As the White Nile passes through the Sudd swamps about half the water is lost to evaporation.

In contrast, the flow of the Blue Nile varies widely through the year: it floods between July and October, due to summer monsoon rains. The waters of the Blue Nile are so substantial during the summer that the White Nile backs up during this time at the confluence. During the summer floods, the contributions to the main Nile are about 70% from the Blue Nile, about 20% from the Atbarah, and about 10% from the White Nile. At the peak of the flood, the daily flow into Lake Nasser is about 0.71 km^{3}, about three times the annual daily average of 0.23 km^{3} per day. (Note: As the Blue Nile flow diminishes in the winter, the pent-up waters of the White Nile increase their flow past Khartoum. In April and May, the White Nile supplies about 80% of the main Nile's water. Thus, the areas downstream of Khartoum receive a steady (not to say constant) flow that made irrigation possible year-round.)

Prior to the construction of dams on the Nile, the flow of the Nile in Egypt varied seasonally: higher in the summer/fall; lower in the winter/spring. (Note: The magnitude of the annual Nile flood can vary widely from year to year. Low-flood periods can last for decades or centuries.) However, following the construction of the Aswan High Dam – which created a reservoir that can hold about two years of river flow – the flow downstream from that dam is now more constant year-round. (Note: The annual flow of the river at Aswan is about 84 cubic km; and the capacity of the Aswan High Dam's reservoir is about 160 cubic km.)

=== Sediment transport ===
The Nile carries sediment downstream. The movement of sediment is classified as suspended sediment (particles suspended in the water) or bedload (sediment on the river bottom that rolls or tumbles downstream). Ninety-seven percent of the transported sediment carried by the Nile comes from the Atbarah and Blue Nile, both of which originate in Ethiopia. The erosion and transportation of silt only occur during the Ethiopian rainy season when rainfall is especially high in the Ethiopian Highlands; the rest of the year, the major rivers draining Ethiopia into the Nile have a weaker flow. The soil in the Nile Delta originated as rocks in Ethiopia. The cumulative amount of rock eroded in the past 30 million years from the Ethiopia headwaters of the Nile is about 102,000 km^{3}, which is roughly comparable to the volume of the soil in the Nile Delta (including the underwater portion) which is about 150,000 km^{3}.

Sediment carried by a river into a reservoir can settle in the reservoir and reduce its storage capacity. Sediment accumulated behind the Sennar Dam, Roseires Dam (on the Blue Nile), and Khashm el Girba Dam (on the Atbarah) has significantly reduced the storage capacity of their reservoirs since they were built.

Annual sediment transport measured at several locations are listed below. (Note: The sediment transport data was gathered over a wide range of years, spanning from 1997 to 2019. Every measurement site had unique collection time spans, specified in Lemma 2019, p. 11 and Sutcliffe 2009, p. 359.) The bedload percentages are the ratio of bedload sediment to total (bedload and suspended) sediment. This data was collected before the construction of the Grand Ethiopian Renaissance Dam, which has a significant impact on sediment loads downstream of the dam.

- Gilgel Abay, Ethiopia : 7.6 million tonnes of suspended, and an additional 0.7% of bedload
- El Deim (at the border of Ethiopia and Sudan): 140 million tonnes
- Aswan, Egypt: 0.14 million tonnes of suspended, and an additional 28% of bedload
- Beni Sweif, Egypt: 0.5 million tonnes of suspended, and an additional 20% of bedload
- Qena, Egypt: 0.27 million tonnes of suspended, and an additional 27% of bedload
- Sohag, Egypt: 1.5 million tonnes of suspended, and an additional 13% of bedload

=== Water sources and sinks ===
Water balance in the Nile Basin is analyzed using hydrology: water input from rain is balanced by water output to the soil, evaporation, and streams.

As the river moves downstream, it gains volume in some regions and loses volume in other regions. A region is a "source" if the region contributes water; conversely, a region is a "sink" if the region removes water. (Note: The technical definitions of source and sink used by scientists are more complicated than presented here. For clarity, the definitions of source and sink have been simplified.) Identifying sources and sinks is important to scientists who study water movement (hydrology), as well as policy makers who negotiate water sharing issues. (Note: Sources and sinks are useful to policy makers when negotiating international water-sharing issues, such as dam construction. In the 21st century, Egypt and Sudan continue to rely on extracting large amounts of water from the Nile for their existence. Some experts predict that the Nile Basin may experience a water scarcity problem in the future, if population growth, agricultural needs, and climate change combine to create a scenario where the water demands exceed the amount of water available.)

The regions of the Nile Basin that are water sources are the upstream areas including the Ethiopian Highlands and the African Great Lakes region. The water sink areas are generally found in the downstream regions, including South Sudan, Sudan, and Egypt.

The water balance methodology is employed to determine which regions are sources and which are sinks. Water balance is a hydrological principle that states that the water entering a region is balanced by the water leaving a region. For a given region, hydrologists measure (or estimate) precipitation, evaporation, transpiration, groundwater recharge, lake-filling rate, and net streamflow. Evaluating these values will indicate if a region is a source or a sink. Generally, a region is a source if the net streamflow is positive; conversely, a region is a sink if the net streamflow is negative. (Note: The water balance of a region can be represented by an equation. There are many water balance equations. A relatively simple equation is: $$P = ET + \Delta S + D + Q$$ In this formula, the precipitation (P) received is equal to the sum of the water losses: evaporation and transpiration (ET), groundwater recharge ($\Delta S$), lake-filling (D), and net streamflow (Q).)

==== Sources and sinks: countries ====
The following table summarizes water balance measurements for countries within the Nile Basin. Portions of countries outside the Nile Basin are excluded from the values.

Key for "Source/Sink" columns
Source	The country is a significant water source
Sink	The country is a significant water sink
Neutral	The country is not a significant source or sink

Most of the per-basin data is presented as annual measurements (usually in km^{3}); but some data is also presented as an equivalent "depth" value (millimeters per year, covering the entire basin).

Country water balance (annual) (Note: Hydrology Table Legend: Precip – Precipitation (P); Evap- Evapotranspiration (ET); Water Bal – Precip-ET; Discharge – River flow at measuring station (average of the entire year); Source or Sink – Is basin a significant source or sink of water?)
Country	Source/Sink (water bal km^{3})	Basin Area km^{2} (Note: Basin area is the Nile Basin within the country.)	Precip km^{3}	Evap km^{3}	Runoff km^{3}
Burundi	Neutral (2)	13,240	14	13	3
DR Congo	Neutral (0)	19,919	23	23	0
Egypt	Sink (−39)	235,108	4	44	0
Eritrea	Neutral (2)	24,427	14	12	0
Ethiopia	Source (164)	363,775	459	295	138
Kenya	Source (27)	49,513	76	49	23
Rwanda	Neutral (1)	20,676	21	20	4
South Sudan	Sink (−146)	617,256	612	757	92
Sudan	Sink (−81)	1,226,660	364	445	23
Tanzania	Source (38)	120,506	160	122	18
Uganda	Source (25)	236,763	301	276	22
Total		2,927,843	2,048	2,056	324

==== Sources and sinks: geographic basins ====
The water balance tables of this article contain water flow information measured at the twelve stations shown in this map. (Note: For clarity, the names of some stations have been changed to use the names of nearby major geographic features. For example, the Kilo3 station is presented here as "Mouth of the Atbarah River". The Paara station is presented here as "Murchison Falls". The "Owen Reservoir" station is presented here as "Lake Victoria outlet".)

Another way of analyzing the water balance of the Nile is to partition the basin geographically (and ignore national boundaries). The following table splits the Nile Basin into twelve smaller basins, and summarizes the water balance data of each of the smaller basins. The data is based on measurements made at a dozen river measurement stations. The stations, shown in the adjacent map, divide the Nile Basin into smaller basins. These basins are each named after their downstream station. For example, the Murchison Falls station (2) is downstream of the Lake Victoria outlet station (1), so the basin between them is named the Murchison Falls basin. (Note: The measuring stations are listed in the following table proceeding from upstream to downstream. The discharge "rate" data is an average of the entire year. The basin data in the table is for each individual basin; it is not cumulative. For example, the runoff of the second basin (Murchison Falls) does not include the runoff of the upstream basin (Lake Victoria outlet).)

Geographic basin water balance (annual)
Basin's downstream station	Source/Sink (water bal km^{3})	Basin Area km^{2}	Precip km^{3}	Evap km^{3}	Runoff km^{3}
1 Lake Victoria outlet (Note: Measured at Nalubaale dam.)	Source (74)	264,259	353	279	57
2 Murchison Falls (Note: Measured at Paara (Uganda), slightly downstream from Murchison Falls.)	Source (15)	85,513	109	94	9
3 Mongalla (Note: Measured at Mongalla, South Sudan, about 40 km downstream (north) of Juba.)	Neutral (1)	131,691	159	158	5
4 Malakal (Note: Malakal is after the confluence of the White Nile and Sobat. It includes both Bahr el Ghazal and Sobat River tributaries.)	Sink (−159)	925,160	798	957	150
5 Khartoum (Note: Measured at Al Mogran before the Blue Nile confluence (includes only the White Nile).)	Sink (−40)	257,130	134	174	14
6 Dam	Source (105)	188,296	246	142	70
7 Khartoum (Note: Includes only Blue Nile (excludes White Nile).)	Neutral (10)	118,651	96	72	9
8 Khashm el Girba (Note: Roughly at the midpoint of the Atbarah river.)	Source (30)	100,318	95	66	10
9 Mouth of Atbarah River (Note: Measured at the Kilo3 station, where the Atbarah joins the Nile.)	Neutral (−3)	104,051	22	25	1
11 Aswan Dam	Sink (−10)	188,011	2	13	0
12 Cairo/Delta (Note: Station is El Ekhsase, near Cairo. Basin data includes the Nile Delta, even though the delta is downstream of the station.)	Sink (−10)	145,293	3	12	0

=== Nilometers ===
Measurements of the Nile's flow have always been essential in helping Egyptians manage their safety and irrigation. Simple gauges, called nilometers, have been used for thousands of years to measure the level of the Nile. An ideal flood in Egypt – not too high and not too low – was a 6-meter (20 ft) rise over the non-flood water level. Any higher and disastrous floods may damage the river communities; any lower, and fertile silt would not be deposited on the croplands. An important nilometer has been in use on Roda Island since at least 622 CE; Egyptians kept records of maximum and minimum river levels from that gauge until 1921. Modern gauges to measure the river level began to be installed in the 1860s, and gauges that also measure the river's current – which provide more accurate flow information – were installed beginning in 1900.

== Ecology ==
=== Animals ===
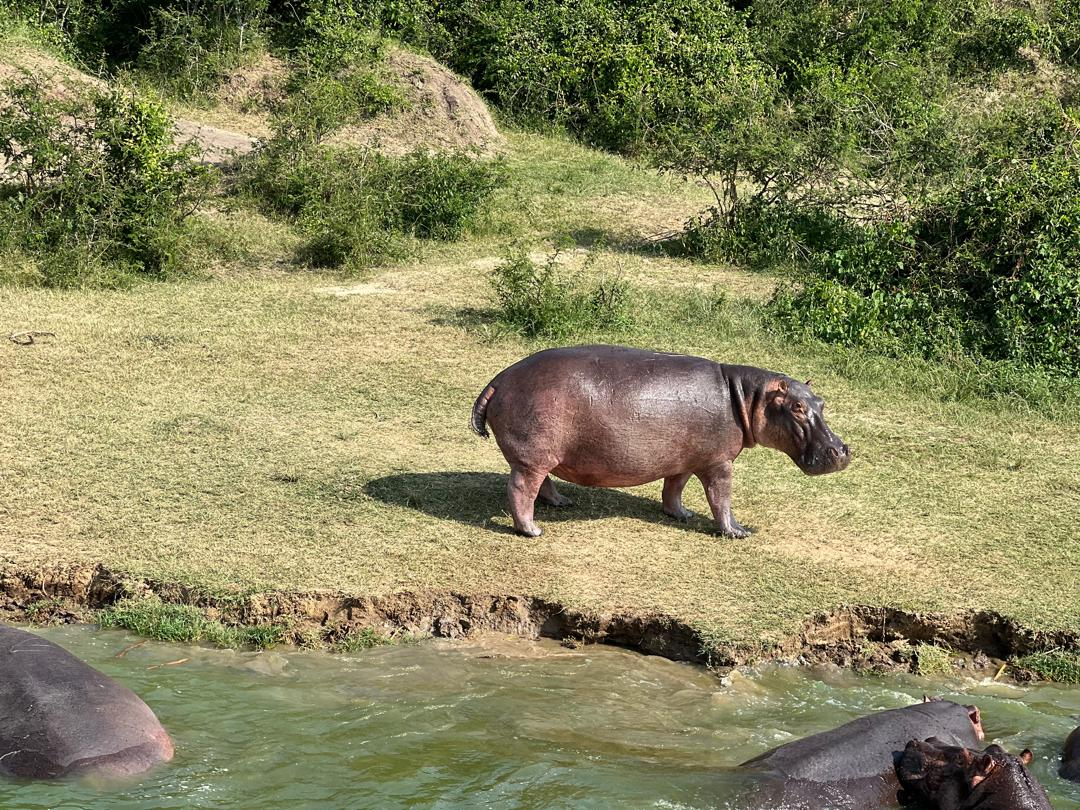
A Hippopotamus amphibius near Lake Edward, one of the lakes that feed the Nile

The total number of fish species found in the Nile Basin is estimated at over 800. In the river alone, 128 species are found, belonging to 27 families. The majority of species belong to four families: Cichlidae (cichlids), Cyprinidae (carp), Mormyridae (elephantfish), and Mochokidae (catfish). A number of Cichlid species are found in the African Great Lakes.

In addition to fish, animals that sometimes reside in the Nile's waters include hippos, crocodiles, and African buffalo. Other water dwellers include molluscs, crabs, and shrimp. Many animals live in the ecosystems along the riverbanks, including elephants, antelope, and giraffes. Snails found in Nile lakes carry parasitic flatworms – known as blood flukes – which are responsible for schistosomiasis that afflicts livestock and humans.

Birds that live on or near the Nile include herons, kingfishers, ospreys, and various kinds of storks – including shoebills. Some of the bird species are endemic to the Nile Basin (such as blue-winged goose), while other species have a cosmopolitan distribution (including moorhen and osprey). Several species of heron, ducks, geese, and egrets live in the basin year-round, and 14 species of ducks and geese arrive only for winter residence. Of the gulls and terns in the basin, the vast majority are migratory. During the past thousand years, the ranges of some species have been reduced due to human encroachment on their habitat.

=== Plants ===
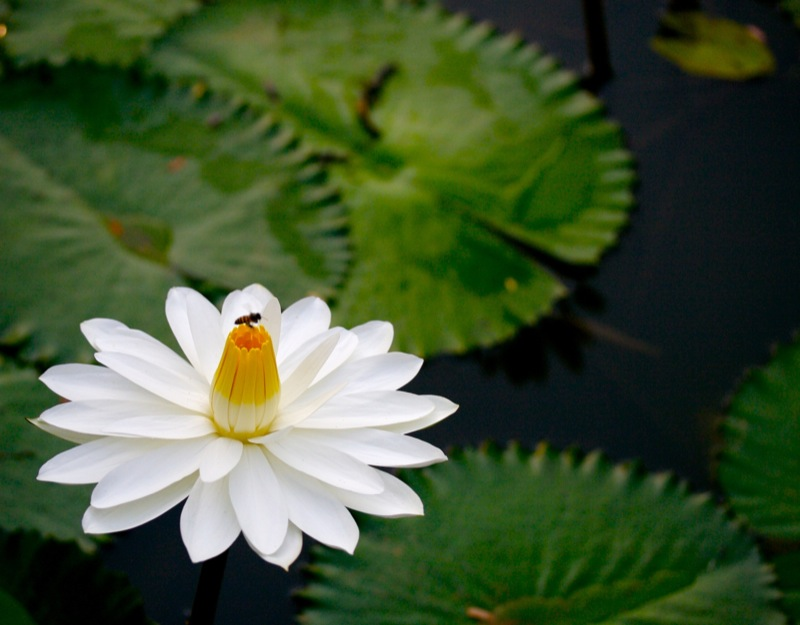
The white Egyptian lotus is native to still waters of the Nile Basin.

The Great Lakes region of the Nile Basin includes plants such as the water lily, papyrus, and water hyacinth. The water hyacinth is an invasive species, and has adversely impacted the populations of native species in Lake Kyoga. Plants common in the Sudd swamp include species that thrive in deep flooding such as Vossia, hippo grass, reed mace, ambatch, and papyrus. The Sudd also hosts species that thrive in shallow flooding, for example Oryza, antelope grass, and Phragmites.

=== Pollution ===
Historically, the water of the Nile was noted for being drinkable, but in the late 20th century, it became less healthy in certain areas. (Note: Jack Talling wrote "Two characteristics of water from the Lower Nile long attracted attention – that it was of excellent quality for drinking and irrigation, and that it seasonally contained high concentration of silt.") Pollution is most pronounced in Lake Tana, near major cities, and in the Nile Delta.

Sources of pollution in the Nile include agricultural, industrial, and household waste. There are 36 industries that discharge their pollution sources directly into the Nile, and 41 into irrigation canals. These types of industries are: chemical, electrical, engineering, fertilizers, food, metal, mining, oil and soap, pulp and paper, textile and wood. There are over 90 agricultural drains that discharge into the Nile that also include industrial wastewater.

River pollution is most pronounced between Aswan and the Mediterranean Sea. The pollution there comes from human activities, agricultural runoff, and industrial waste. Concentrations of pollutants increase as the river flows downstream, due to the cumulative effects of pollution sources. The delta is susceptible to accumulated concentrations because of poor flushing actions, exacerbated by a flat topography and heavy silting in the riverbed.

In the late 20th century, Lake Victoria experienced increased eutrophication (excess nutrients in the lake which cause the growth of plants and algae that deplete the oxygen in the water). The eutrophication is due to human activity, deforestation, and poor agricultural practices, and has caused algal blooms and a rapid proliferation of water hyacinth, which have disrupted the ecosystem.

=== Conservation and human impact ===
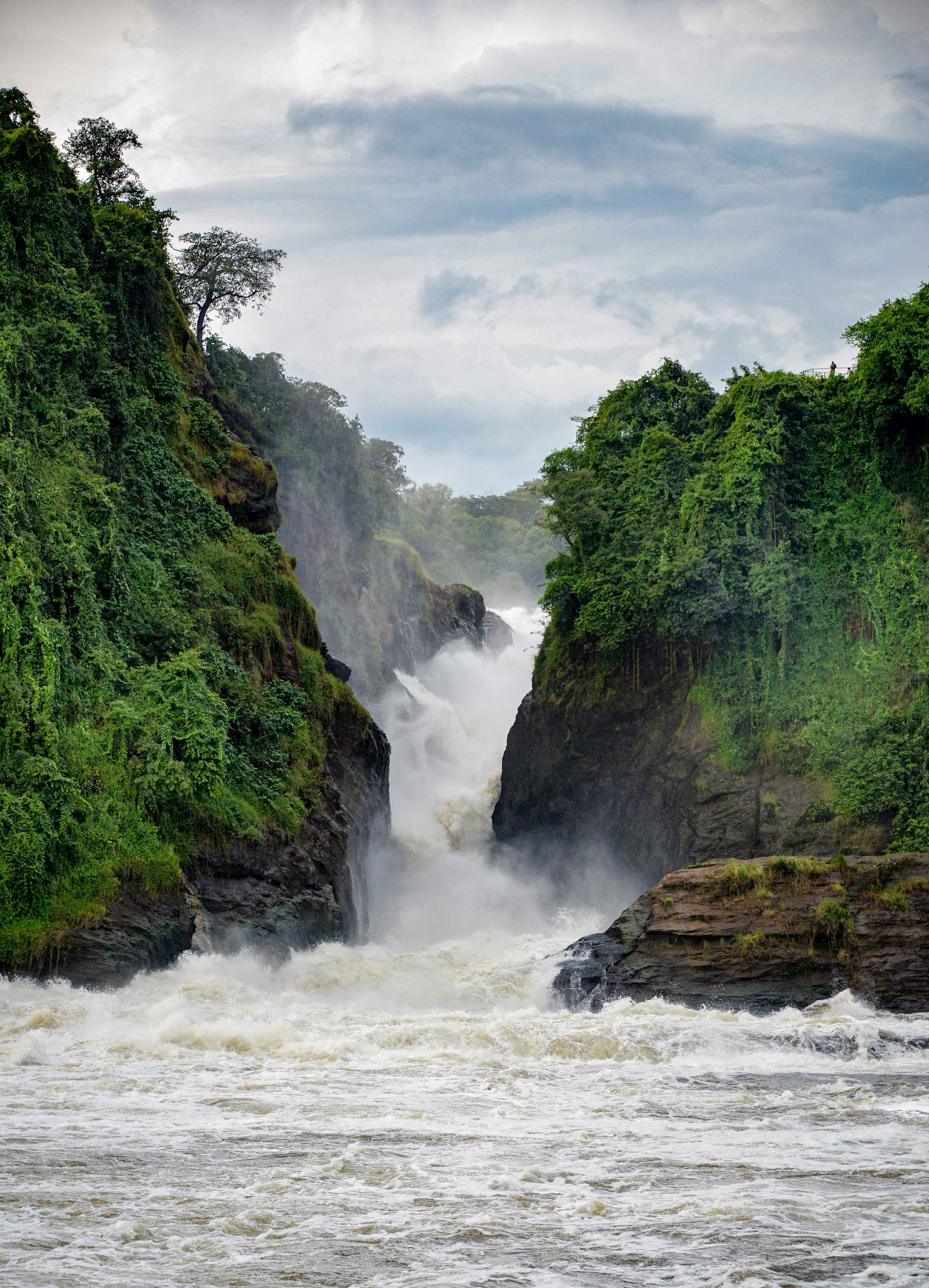
Murchison Falls on the White Nile

The Nile Basin was relatively wet and humid from 15 thousand years ago (kya) to 5 kya, which enabled the start of large-scale agriculture in the Nile Basin around 5 kya. The growth of agriculture has had an increasing impact on the environment since then, leading to widespread deforestation and soil erosion. The impacts were worsened by drier conditions in Africa that started about 4 kya. These arid conditions led to famines, social disruption, and environmental degradation.

Several species of animals have become extinct in the Nile Basin due to human activity. The sacred ibis was important in the ancient Egyptian religion, and millions of the ibis were ritually sacrificed. The species became locally extinct in Egypt in the late 19th century, but remains common in central and southern Africa. In Egypt, overpopulation and the construction of the Aswan High Dam have led to the extinction or near-extinction of a large number of plant and animal species.

The Nile perch was native to several places in Africa, including the Congo, but was not present in the Nile or its lakes until it was surreptitiously introduced to Lake Victoria in the 1950s to create a fishing stock. (Note: The Nile perch was introduced to Lake Victoria by Ugandan authorities in a clandestine effort to create a new fishery; but this has never been acknowledged by Uganda.) The Nile perch caused the extinction of over 500 species of cichlids in Lake Victoria, which the scientist Les Kaufman described as the first mass extinction of vertebrates that scientists have had the opportunity to observe. The Nile perch also led to increased deforestation, because firewood was required to process the fish.

The satellite lakes of Lake Kyoga are potentially important for future conservation efforts, because they contain at least 60 species of haplochromines, and have not yet been invaded by the Nile perch.

=== Climate and climate change ===
This map shows the Köppen climate classification zones in the Nile Basin and the surrounding region. The northern part of the basin is a hot, dry desert (Bwh) while the south is cooler and wetter (C and A zones).

The climate of the Nile Basin is characterized by a gradient, transitioning from very dry in the north to wetter to the south. The basin can be divided into nine distinct rainfall regions: the northern regions (Egypt and Sudan) are very dry all year; the middle regions (including Ethiopia) have strong peaks of rainfall in the summer; and the southern regions (around Lake Victoria) have two rainfall peaks – in spring and fall. The majority of the rainfall in the Nile Basin is associated with the summer monsoon.

The Nile Basin is experiencing climate changes related to the increasing prevalence of greenhouse gases in the atmosphere. Some projections for the 21st century predict a temperature increase of 2 to 4 °C. Models of the future climate in the North Africa and Middle East region predict an increase in the frequency and severity of droughts, and increasing variability of precipitation. The Nile Delta is particularly vulnerable, and the combined action of sea level rise and lack of sediment replenishment (due to dams on the Nile) may cause one third of the surface area of the Nile Delta to disappear within the next century.

== Geological history ==
Geological data, as seen in this map of northeast Africa, are used by geologists to reconstruct ancient topography and water flows.

The Nile – like most rivers – evolved from ancestral river systems that followed significantly different courses. Over millions of years, tectonic and environmental forces shifted, separated, and merged rivers. The river assumed its current form relatively recently, about 15,000 years ago. One hypothesis describes the Nile's geological history as a sequence of five evolutionary periods. (Note: These five periods were proposed by Abdelsalam 2018 based on major environmental and tectonic events that impacted the Nile. Other scientists hypothesize a different set of evolutionary periods; for example, geologist Rushdi Said hypothesized eight periods in their book Said 1993.)

- Around 20 million years ago (mya), the west flank of the East African Rift System began to uplift, separating the African Great Lakes region from the Congo basin. About 6 mya, the ancestral Nile in Egypt was a relatively short river, originating near the modern Wadi Howar and flowing north into the Mediterranean Sea. Lake Victoria did not exist, and the rivers in the Ethiopian and Ugandan highlands did not flow north or connect to the Egyptian Nile.
- From 6 to 5.4 mya, Lake Tana in the Ethiopian Highlands was formed, and a large paleolake – Obweruka – existed where the modern Lake Albert and Lake Edward are. The Messinian salinity crisis happened in this period: the Mediterranean Sea became disconnected from the Atlantic Ocean, so the sea completely evaporated. The empty Mediterranean caused the ancestral Nile to cut a deep gorge in Egypt, called the Eonile. The river waters flowing through the gorge eroded a canyon several hundred meters below world ocean level at Aswan, and 2,400 meters (7,900 ft) below at Cairo. After the Mediterranean Sea once again connected to the ocean, the sea refilled and the Eonile became a gulf which eventually filled with sediment.
- About 2.5 mya – for the first time – the Ethiopian waters flowed north and connected to the ancestral Egyptian Nile. The Rwenzori Mountains uplifted causing paleolake Obweruka to begin draining to the east (before, it drained to the west) and to start forming Lake Victoria. (Note: Obweruka existed from about 7.5 mya to 2.5 mya.) The waters forming Lake Victoria did not yet drain northward into Sudan or Egypt.
- Around 0.5 mya, Lake Victoria assumed roughly its modern shape, and the great lakes plateau tilted northward and began intermittently draining into Sudan and connecting to the ancestral Nile in Egypt, forming a series of rivers that approximately traced the course of the modern White Nile. Paleolakes formed in the area of the modern Sudd swamps.
- Fifteen kya, the African Great Lakes assumed their current shapes, and the flow from those lakes north to Sudan was no longer intermittent. Some paleolakes dried out in South Sudan and in Egypt near the Toshka Lakes. During this period, the summer monsoon shifted and substantially increased rainfall in the area of Lake Victoria and Lake Albert. The high water levels of both the Blue Nile and White Nile fluctuated widely during this period, with unusually high water levels occurring several times. The present-day course of the Nile was established early in this period.

== Human history ==
=== Prehistory ===
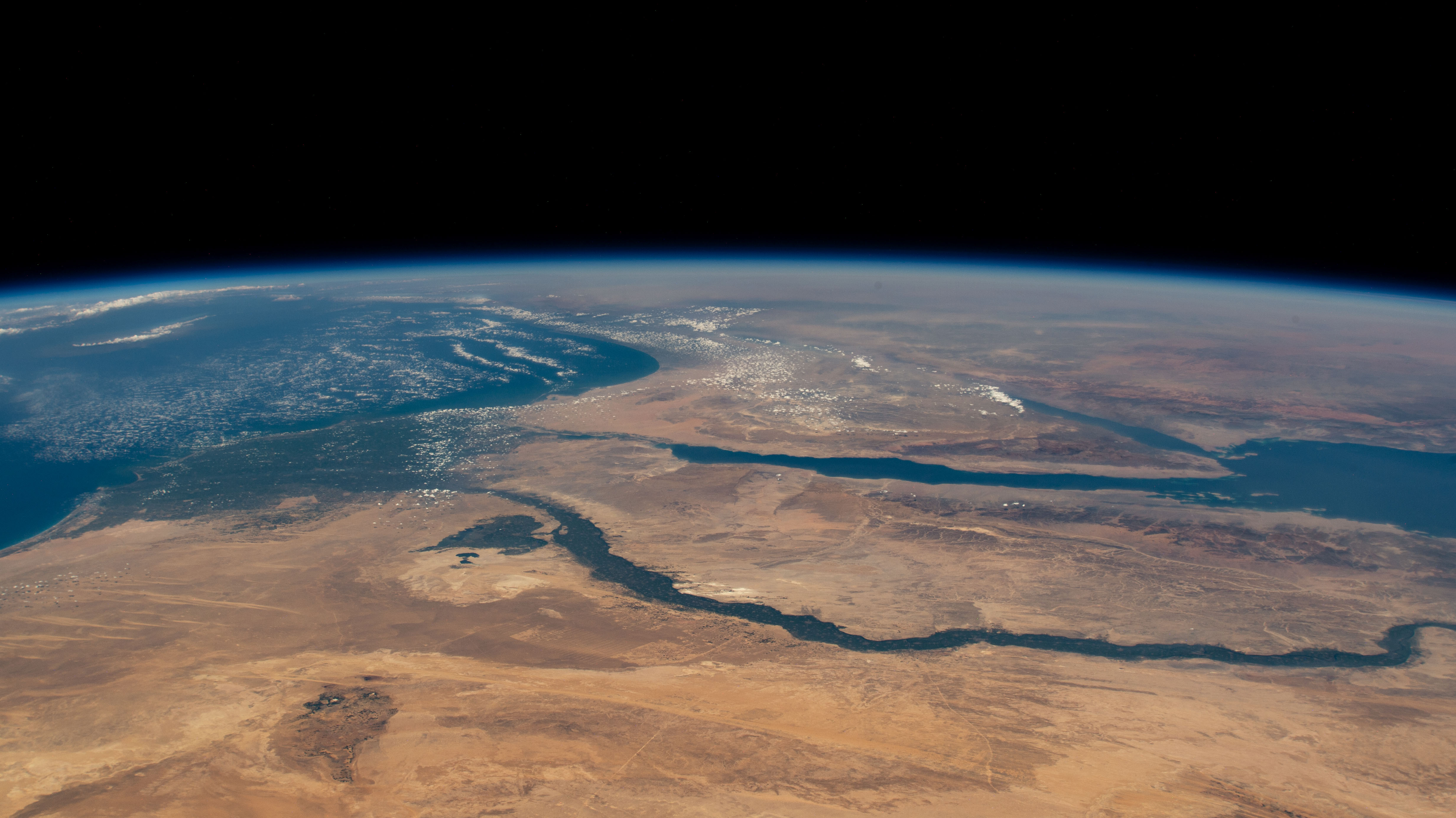
The Nile (bottom) flows through Egypt's desert, which was much wetter during the African humid period.

Early ancestors of the human species lived near the Nile Basin. The Australopithecus afarensis fossil Lucy was found slightly east of the basin's boundary. Olduvai Gorge – site of the first Homo habilis fossils – is located just south of the basin. Within the Nile Basin, the Nyayanga archaeological site on the east shore of Lake Victoria has Oldowan tools dating back 2.6 million years. (Note: The Nile and Lake Victoria did not exist in their current forms during the times of Australopithecus afarensis, Homo habilis, or the Oldowan industry.) Human settlements on the banks of the Nile have been dated to between 12,000 and 20,000 years ago in a settlement near the modern town of Qurta (Egypt). These humans carved petroglyphs into rock, depicting aurochs, birds, hippopotamids, gazelle, hartebeest, and fish. Some scholars have hypothesized that these peoples, or other peoples that resided nearby, may have domesticated sheep, goats, or cattle. The eastern Sahara – including Egypt and Sudan – was much wetter during the African humid period which lasted from about 10,000 to 5,000 years ago. Pastoral herding cultures developed during that period, but when the climate became drier around 3,900 BCE, people were forced to migrate to the Nile valley to survive. This was the origin of the Nubian cultures in Sudan and the Ancient Egyptian civilization.

=== Ancient Egyptian civilization ===
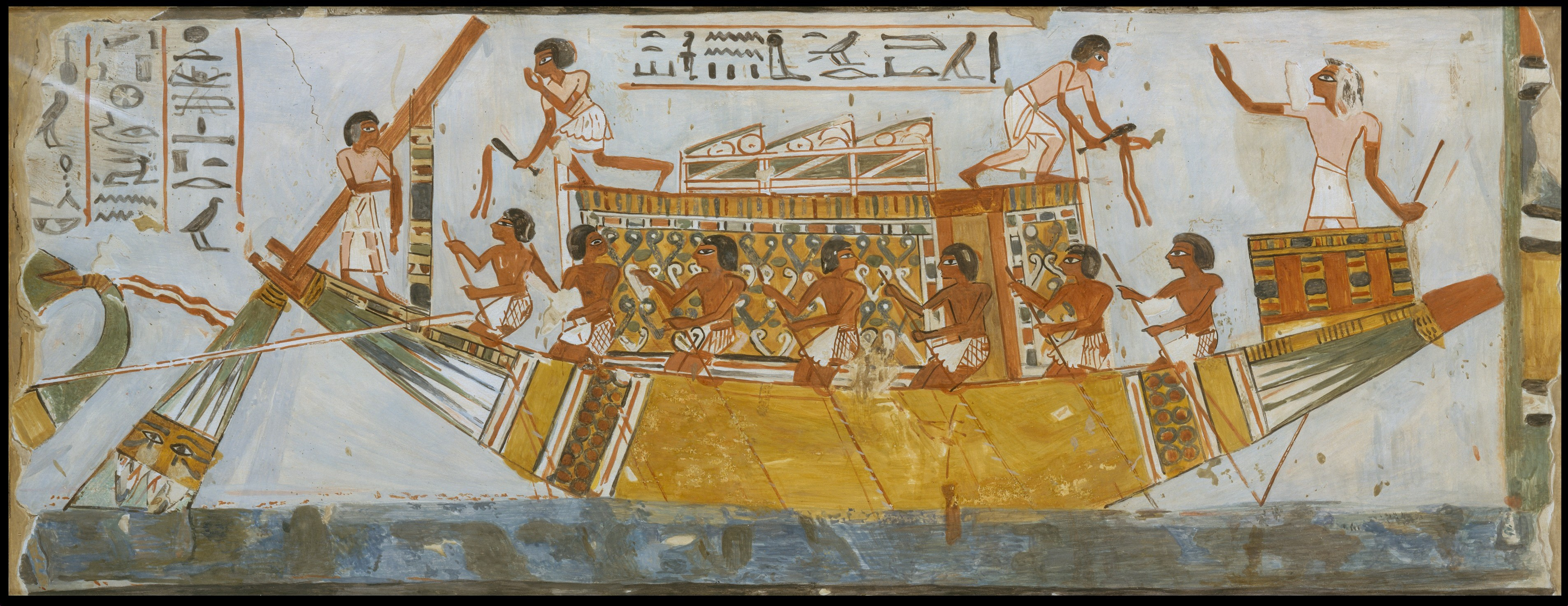
Ancient Egyptians used boats extensively for transport. This image is from the Tomb of Pairy.

The Nile was central to every facet of Egyptian life: it provided food through the crops it watered, and it caused death when droughts led to crop failures and famine. The Nile encouraged the growth of science and government: irrigation, flood predictions and taxation all required new mathematical and administrative skills. Weather prediction and astronomy also developed as a consequence of the Egyptians' need to understand the river and its floods.

The ancient Egyptian calendar was based on the flood cycle of the Nile. The year was divided into three seasons, each consisting of four months of thirty days each. The seasons were Akhet (literally, 'inundation'), Peret ('growing'), and Shemu ('harvest'). Akhet was the time of the year when the Nile flooded, leaving a new layer of fertile soil behind; Peret was the growing season; and Shemu was the harvest season when there were no rains. The Nile influenced their language: compass directions were based on a person facing upstream: the same word could be used for both up and south; another word for left and east; and another for right and west. They sometimes referred to rain as "Nile in the sky".

Ancient Egypt consisted of two regions: Lower Egypt (the Nile Delta) and Upper Egypt (the Nile Valley, roughly between Giza and the first cataract). The Nile played a role in determining the unique character of each region, because the ever-shifting waterways in Lower Egypt meant that transportation routes, settlements, and administrative regions were often forced to relocate. The Lower and Upper regions were each represented by a unique Nile plant: papyrus and sedge, respectively.

Ancient Egypt's southern boundary was – informally – at the river's first cataract (near Elephantine Island) because transportation beyond those rapids was difficult. The Egyptians were familiar with the course of the Nile upstream to the sixth cataract (present-day Khartoum), but were not familiar with the river's course (nor its source) beyond that. (Note: The ancient Egyptians were familiar with the Blue Nile's course up to Lake Tana.) The Nile led the Egyptians to build the world's earliest known major dam – now known as the Sadd el-Kafara – circa 2600 BCE in an attempt to control flooding. (Note: The Sadd el-Kafara failed before it was completed, and never functioned as a dam.)

=== Nubian, Ethiopian, and Nilotic cultures ===
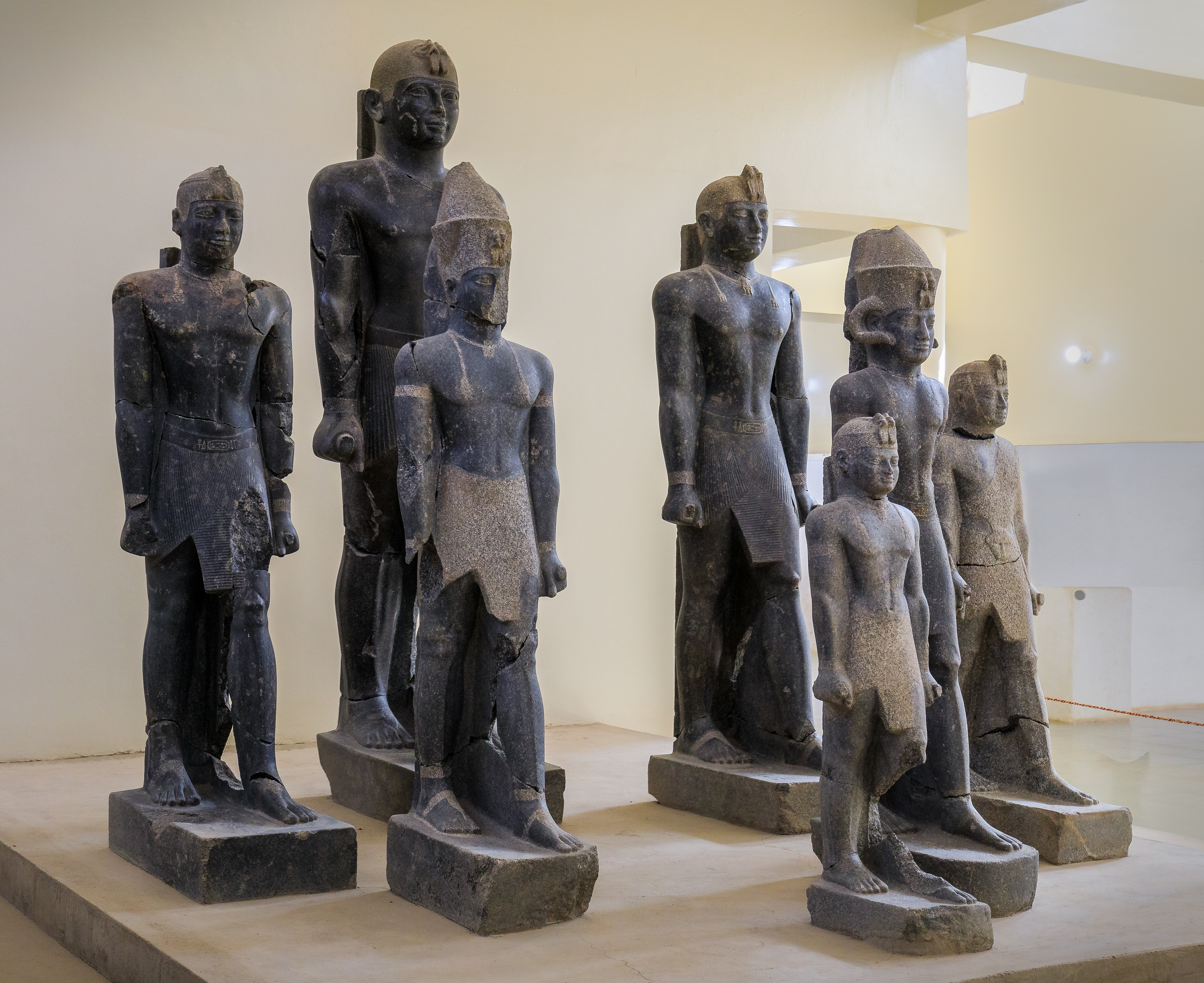
The Twenty-fifth Dynasty of Egypt was led by Kushite kings, also known as the Black Pharaohs.

South of the second Nile cataract lies Nubia, home to a series of cultures along the Nile (in what is now modern Sudan) that started development at the end of the African humid period. (Note: Some authorities place the northern limit of Nubia at the First Cataract; others at the Second Cataract.) These Nubian cultures developed in parallel with the Egyptian civilization to the north, but they had little contact with each other until the Old Kingdom of Egypt around 3,000 BCE. An early Nubian civilization was the Kerma culture, extant from about 2600 BCE to 1500 BCE. Kerma culture was originally pastoral and cattle-oriented, but gradually shifted to agriculture as the Sahara dried at the end of the African humid period. Around 780 BCE, the Kushite Empire arose along the banks of the Nile, including the Atbarah tributary. The Kushite Empire conquered much of Egypt under the rule of its Black Pharaohs, (Note: Also called "Kushite Pharaohs".) who led the empire from the cities Napata and Meroë on the banks of the Nile. After the rise of Christianity, Christian kingdoms in Nubia (including Nobatia, Makuria, and Alodia) developed along the Nile.

In the area occupied by modern Eritrea and northern Ethiopia, the Kingdom of Aksum flourished from the 1st century to 960 CE. Aksum primarily used the Red Sea for transport, but the Atbarah and Blue Nile were also within its realm. The Funj Sultanate (1504 to 1821) ruled over the area approximately covered by modern Sudan. The Ethiopian Empire (1270–1974) occupied the areas of modern Ethiopia and Eritrea.

The Nile Basin is home to the Nilotic peoples, a broad group of communities which originated near the Nile in what is now South Sudan, and migrated south and east into present-day Uganda and Kenya. Nilotic peoples include the Dinka and Nuer, who are South Sudan's largest ethnic groups; both are semi-nomadic cattle herders who practice nomadic pastoralism, moving their cattle seasonally in response to the Nile's floods.

=== Egypt from Roman era to colonial era ===
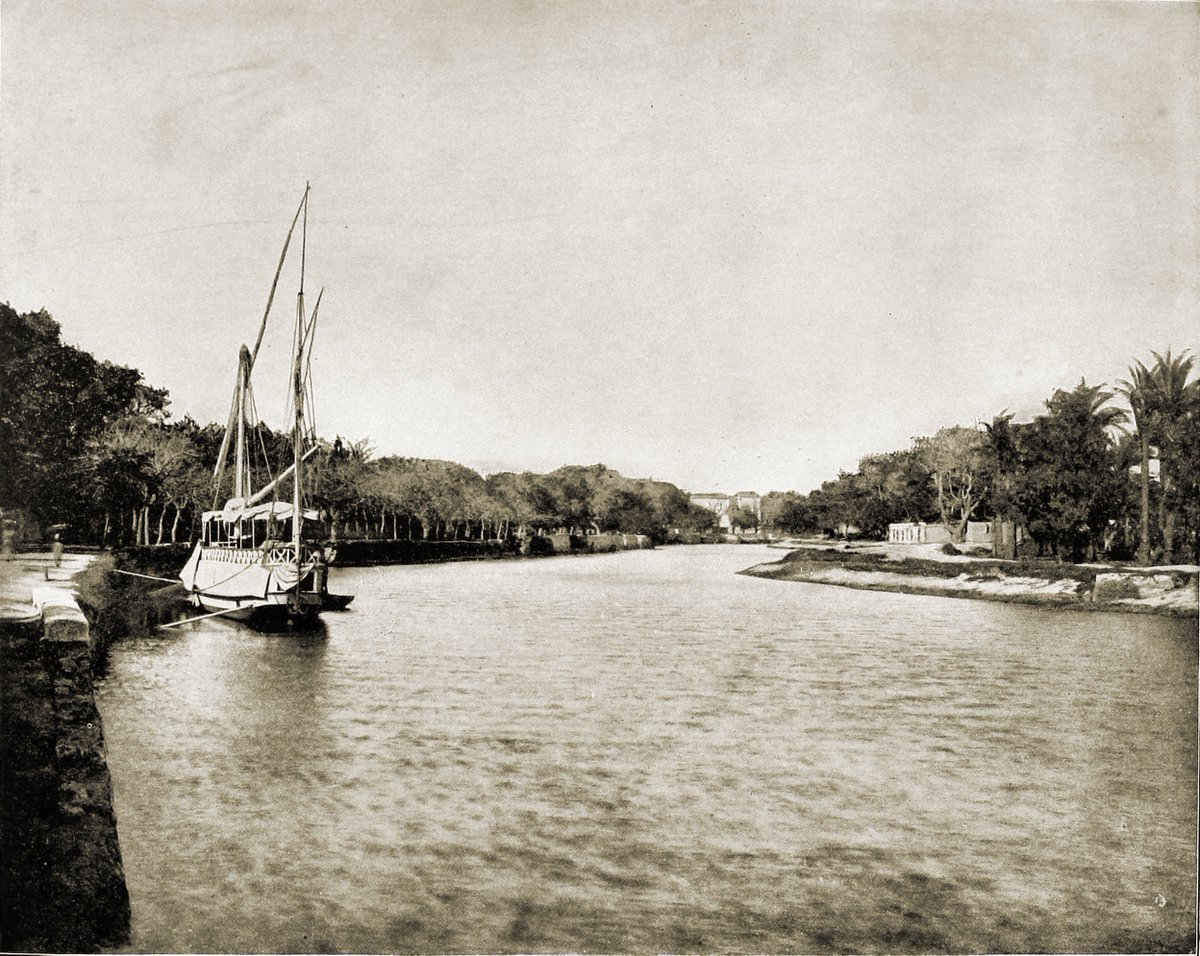
The Mahmoudiyah Canal was built by Muhammad Ali (ruler of Egypt from 1805 to 1848) to support irrigation and transportation.

The Nile was a major factor in the growth of the Roman Empire, which ruled Egypt for several centuries. The Romans imported vast amounts of grain from Egypt, grown with the Nile's floodwaters. In the first century, emperor Trajan constructed a canal connecting the Nile to the Red Sea. Between 945 and 977 CE, the Nile floods were exceptionally low; the resulting crop failures caused political instability which led to the rise of the Fatimid Caliphate. (Note: Around 642 CE, Arab conquerors brought Islam to Egypt, supplanting the ancient Egyptian religion.) Canals in Egypt continued to be built and maintained by the Fatimids (10th and 11th centuries), Mamluk Sultanate (13th to 16th centuries), and Ottoman Egypt (16th to 19th centuries). Canals were used for agricultural purposes, and also for trade and for military purposes. Although Egyptian civilizations were proficient at canal-building, they did not successfully build dams or reservoirs on the Nile until the 19th century, when cotton – irrigated with Nile waters – became an important cash crop for Egypt. These early dams were built during the rule of Muhammad Ali (ruler of Egypt from 1805 to 1848). The first small dams were constructed in the Nile Delta and near Cairo, and acted to extend the growing season of crops. Ali also built canals including the Mahmoudiyah Canal, started in 1818. Ismail Pasha (Viceroy of Egypt, 1863–1879) built the Ibrahimiya Canal – completed in 1873 – that runs parallel to the Nile and is used for irrigation.

=== Search for the source of the Nile ===
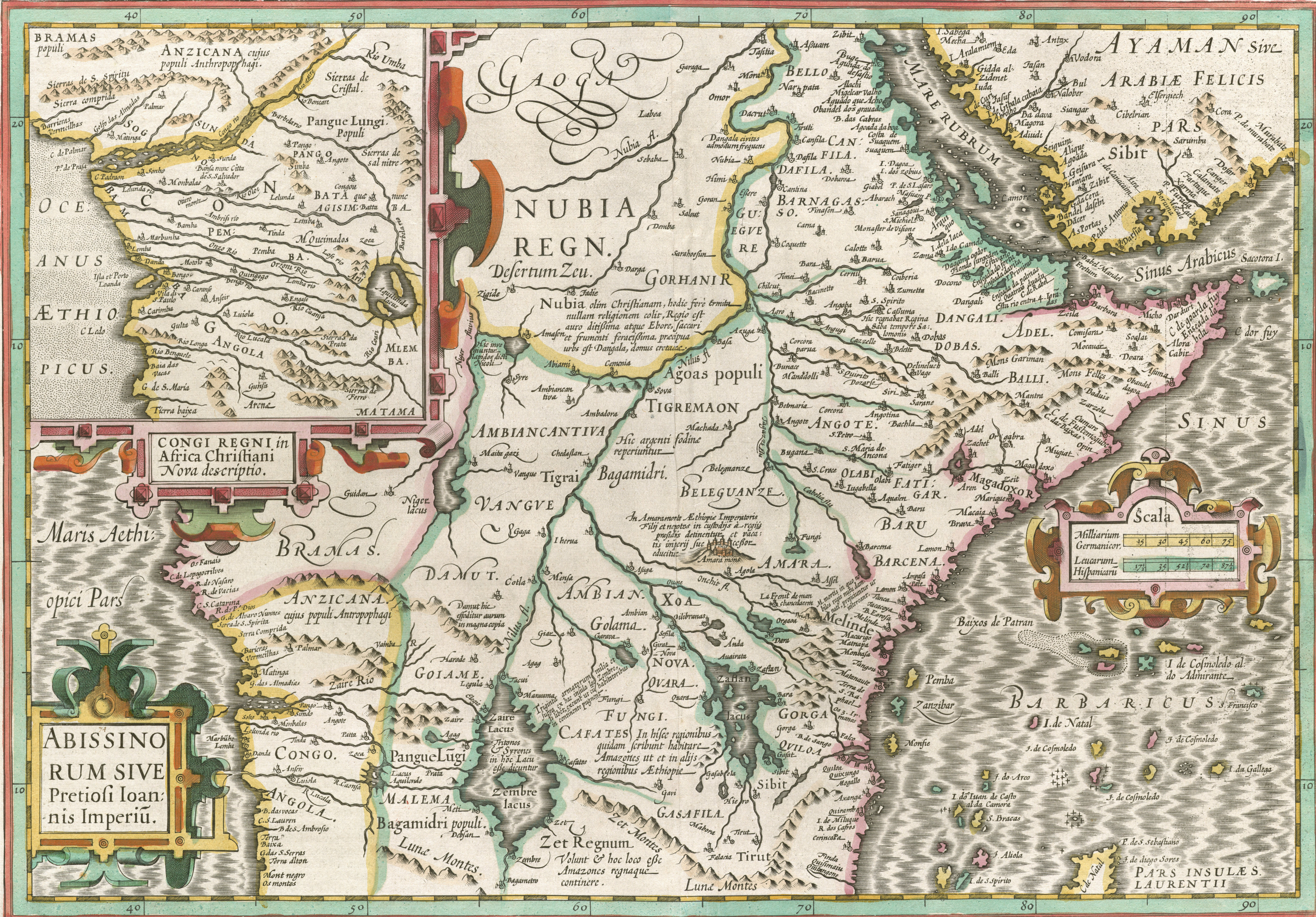
Seventeenth century European map of central Africa. The Nile is labeled Nilus fl. Many features in the map are speculative or fanciful. (Note: The map was engraved by Jodocus Hondius or one of his followers, and published around 1619.)

Since the time of the ancient Greeks, Europeans have been curious about the source of the Nile and the origin of its floods. Herodotus was a Greek historian who visited Egypt in 457 BCE and traveled up the Nile to Aswan; he was puzzled by the Nile floods, which began in the summer – a season when Egypt had no rainfall. Geographers in Europe, Africa, and Arabia – dating back to Eratosthenes in the second century BCE – speculated that the source was a collection of lakes in central Africa. Many early maps of Africa showed the Nile originating in large lakes in Africa's interior but until the 1600s they were all speculative and not based on firm scientific knowledge. (Note: An example of an early map that shows the Nile and its source is from the 12th century, when the Arabian geographer Muhammad al-Idrisi published a book Tabula Rogeriana which showed the Nile flowing from a large lake in Africa's interior.)

The source of the Blue Nile was established as a result of Portuguese interest in Ethiopia: the Jesuit missionary Pedro Páez visited the source – Gish Abay – in the early 17th century, and wrote História da Etiópia describing his time in Ethiopia. His accounts do not contain a specific date for his visit to Gish Abay. Later European explorers who reached Ethiopia in the 17th and 18th centuries – including Jerónimo Lobo and James Bruce – publicized Páez's writings and estimated that he visited the source between 1613 and 1618.

The source of the White Nile proved to be more difficult to establish than that of the Blue Nile. Lake Victoria was not definitively established as a major source of the White Nile until 260 years after Gish Abay was identified as the Blue Nile's source. In 1858, John Hanning Speke was the first European to see Lake Victoria, and he later found a river flowing out from the north side of the lake which he concluded was the Nile. He did not follow that river from Lake Victoria to Sudan, leading some to doubt his conclusion that the lake's outflow was the Nile.

Efforts to precisely pinpoint the farthest source of the White Nile began in the early 20th century when Richard Kandt suggested that the source was a tributary of the Kagera River in the Nyungwe Forest – the Kagera feeds into Lake Victoria. The source location was refined in 1969 when a group of researchers from Waseda University identified a specific tributary of the Kagera. In 2006, a group of adventurers rediscovered the 1969 location, and placed a large marker on a nearby tree. In 2009, academics used satellite imagery to further refine the location of the source, placing it at a spring several km from the 1969/2006 source.

== Water politics in the modern era ==
The Nile crosses several international borders, making it a transboundary river and the subject of political tensions.

=== Colonial era ===
After British colonial rule of Egypt commenced in 1882, (Note: European powers divided up Africa during a process called the Scramble for Africa, formalized in the Berlin Conference of 1885. Under that agreement, Britain received most of the Nile Basin.) they started additional water projects to enhance cotton production and support the rapidly growing Egyptian population. (Note: Egypt became nominally independent in 1922, but Britain maintained control of foreign policy and kept armed forces near the Suez Canal. Full independence was achieved in 1957 after the Suez Crisis.) The first major dam built on the Nile was the Aswan Low Dam, completed in 1902. Its height was raised twice: in 1912 and 1933. Other dams built under the colonial regime include the Sennar Dam, built between 1914 and 1925 on the Blue Nile in Sudan, and the Jebel Aulia Dam, completed in 1937 near Khartoum. The primary purpose of the dams built in the 20th century was to support irrigation; hydropower generation was only a secondary goal.

In 1929, an agreement between Egypt and Anglo-Egyptian Sudan was reached. The agreement provided that Egypt and Sudan utilize 48 and 4 billion cubic meters of the Nile flow per year, respectively. Egypt reserved the right to monitor the Nile flow in the upstream countries, to undertake river-related projects without the consent of upriver nations, and to veto any construction projects that would adversely affect Egypt.

=== Post-colonial era ===
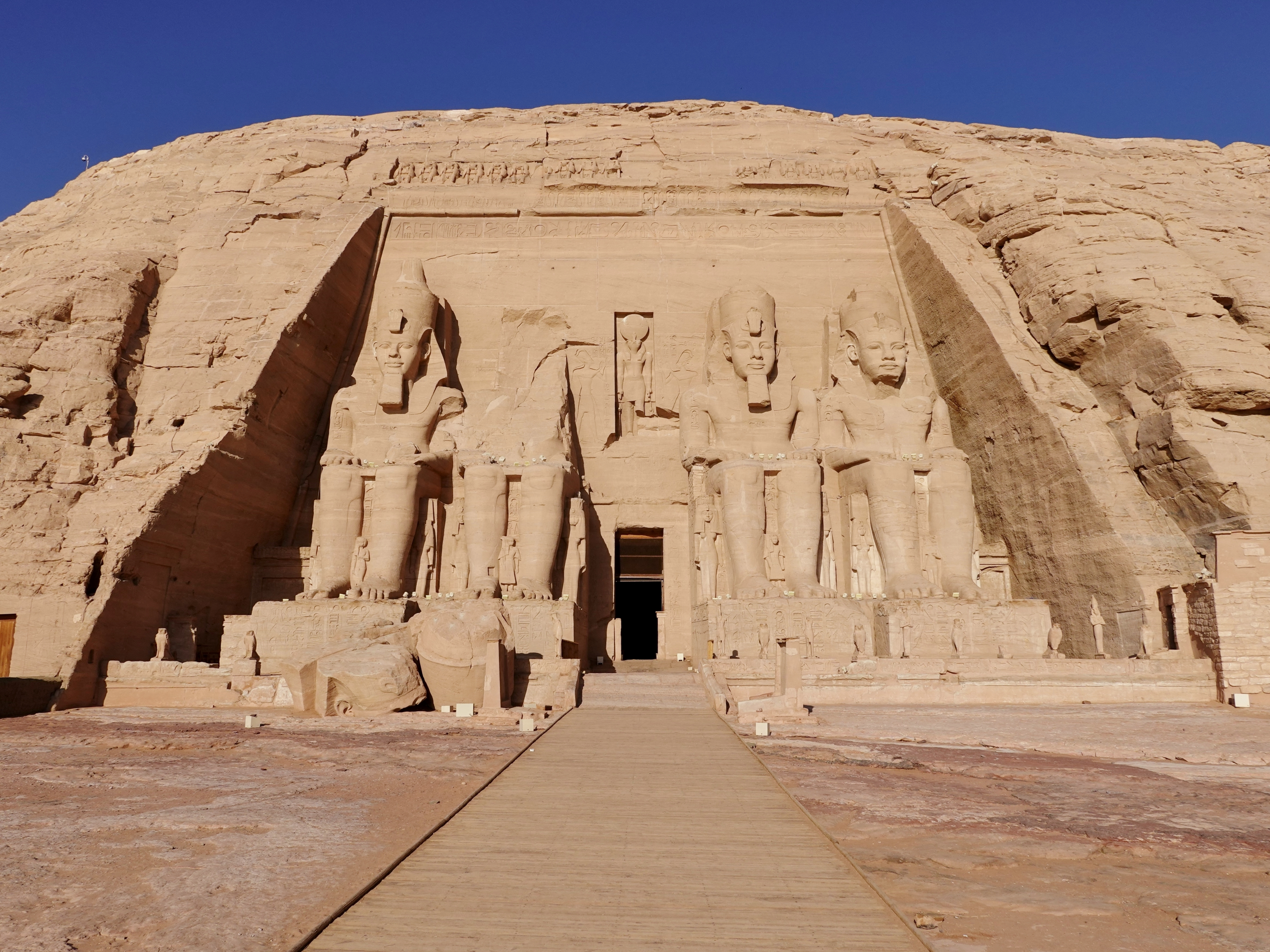
The Abu Simbel temples were relocated to higher ground when the Aswan High Dam was built and submerged their original location.

Egypt and Sudan became independent from Britain in the mid-1950s. In 1959 Egypt and Sudan updated the 1929 water-sharing agreement. The new agreement allocated the water to be shared between Egypt and Sudan at 55.5 and 18.5 billion cubic meters respectively. Upstream countries within the Nile Basin were excluded from the 1959 agreement – including Ethiopia, which is the source of over two-thirds of the Nile's water.

The 1959 agreement included terms permitting Egypt and Sudan to build dams, which they did: Egypt built the Aswan High Dam (completed 1970); Sudan built the Khashm el-Girba Dam (1964), Roseires Dam (1966), Merowe Dam (2009), and Upper Atbara and Setit Dam Complex (2017). (Note: The 1959 agreement also provided for financial compensation paid from Egypt to Sudan for the displacement of Nubians as a result of the new reservoir behind the Aswan High Dam.)

In 1960, Egypt started building the Aswan High Dam which stores roughly two years' flow of the Nile. The dam effectively turned the downstream stretch of the Nile (from the dam to the sea) into a large irrigation canal. The dam has positive impacts: more water is available for irrigation, and hydropower has provided more electricity for Egyptian manufacturing. Negative impacts of the dam include poorer water quality, reduced fertility of soil due to lack of new sediment deposited by floods, increased salinity of soil, schistosomiasis, habitat loss for native flora and fauna, and displacement of Nubians.

The Aswan High Dam flooded a large area of the Nile Valley, and would have submerged several important historical monuments. An international campaign to save some monuments from becoming submerged by the new reservoir successfully saved some monuments, including the Abu Simbel temples. The Aswan High Dam also forced the relocation of many Nubians that lived in the valley inundated by the new reservoir. The Nubians were removed from their ancestral homelands, and many were forced to migrate to cities in Egypt and Sudan.

=== Late 20th century disagreements and negotiations ===
Throughout the 20th century, there was a marked imbalance in political power within the Nile Basin: Egypt and Sudan in the north wielded more power than the other ten nations to the south. After Egypt and Sudan created the 1959 agreement, several of the upstream nations (including Kenya, Tanzania, Uganda, and Ethiopia) began to voice objections to the terms of the agreement, and argued that they were not bound by the agreement because they were not parties to it. The arguments of the upstream nations were that the dams built by Egypt and Sudan protected those two countries from drought, famine, and floods, yet upstream countries such as Ethiopia were still subject to droughts and famine. (Note: According to Sundeep Waslekar, Nile Basin droughts in the 20th century affected around 170 million people and killed half a million people. From the 70 incidents of drought which took place between 1900 and 2012, 55 incidents took place in Ethiopia, Sudan, South Sudan, Kenya and Tanzania.) For example, the Aswan High Dam generated about 10 billion kilowatt-hours per year; and enabled Egyptian farmers to cultivate three harvests per year, compared to a single harvest before the dam. Egyptian leaders often stated that they were willing to employ military force to protect their rights under the 1959 agreement.

In the late 20th century, African nations participated in several efforts to establish water-sharing policies – including the Undugu Commission (active from 1983 to 1993) and TECCONILE (active 1993 to 1998) – but were not successful in creating long-term agreements. In 1999, nine of the ten (Note: South Sudan was not yet a country in 1999, but joined the Nile Basin Initiative in 2012. Eritrea has declined to participate in the Nile Basin Initiative.) Nile Basin countries – Burundi, Democratic Republic of the Congo, Egypt, Ethiopia, Kenya, Rwanda, Sudan, Tanzania and Uganda – established the Nile Basin Initiative to promote peaceful dialogue regarding issues related to the Nile Basin.

=== Power shift to upstream nations ===
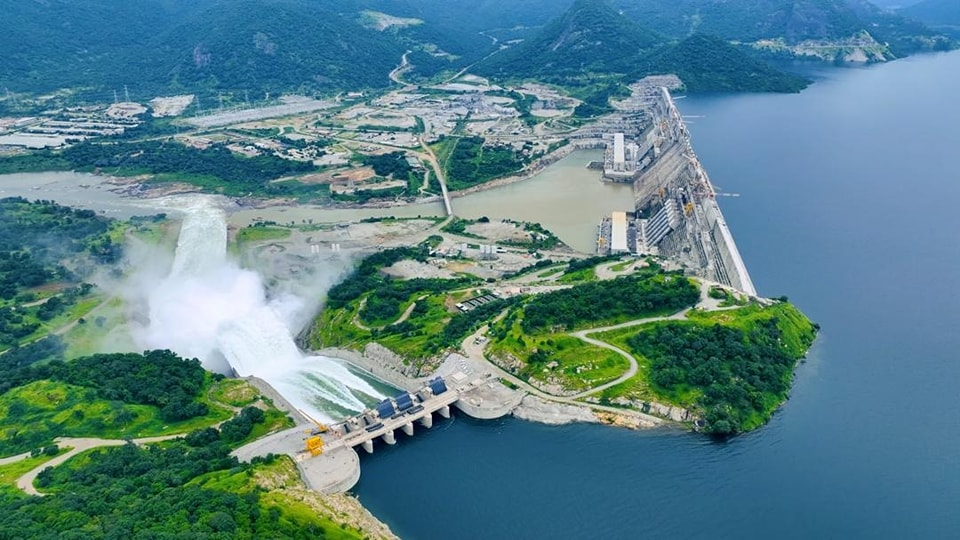
The Grand Ethiopian Renaissance Dam, completed in 2025, generates over 5 gigawatts.

At the start of the 21st century, power shifted to the upstream nations as they began to build dams without the consent of Egypt or Sudan. In 2008, Ethiopia built the Tekezé Dam without seeking permission from Egypt or Sudan. In 2010, five upstream countries – Uganda, Ethiopia, Rwanda, Tanzania, and Kenya (Note: Kenya was not one of the initial signatories, but signed it soon after it was created.) – signed a new agreement – the Cooperative Framework Agreement – which aimed to allocate waters more equitably for upstream countries. Kenya was motivated to sign the agreement because it had plans to pump water out of Lake Victoria for irrigation. The 2010 agreement was opposed by Egypt and Sudan. In 2011, South Sudan became independent from Sudan, becoming the eleventh country in the Nile Basin. In subsequent water disputes, South Sudan allied with the upstream nations rather than with Sudan.

In 2011, Ethiopia announced plans to build a large dam on the Blue Nile near the border with Sudan. The dam was later named the Grand Ethiopian Renaissance Dam (GERD). Ethiopia viewed the GERD as essential to the nation's future, because the electrical power generated by the dam would enable it to significantly increase the quality of life of its population. Egypt was concerned that the dam would imperil the irrigation of its crops because Egypt already uses nearly all of the river water that enters its country, and it was concerned that the new dam would lead to water shortages. Sudan was concerned about safety and water supply. After the dam was announced, Egyptian president Mohamed Morsi hinted that military strikes on Ethiopia were an option, and Sudan and Egypt conducted several joint military exercises.

Numerous negotiations were conducted between Ethiopia, Sudan, and Egypt while the dam was constructed and the reservoir was filled. In 2015 the countries signed a "Declaration of Principles" which contained high-level agreements regarding water usage and reservoir filling procedures. (Note: The 2015 agreement stipulated that the three countries would use the Nile's waters in a fair and appropriate manner. They agreed on an approach to filling the reservoir and operating the dam.) In 2019, the United States hosted talks between the involved nations. In 2020, the African Union started facilitating talks. That year, Egypt asked the United Nations Security Council to intervene, but it declined to do so. In 2021 and 2022, the UAE hosted talks. Construction of the GERD dam was completed in 2020, and in 2025 the reservoir was full and most of the dam's generators were producing electricity.

== Economy ==
=== Agriculture ===
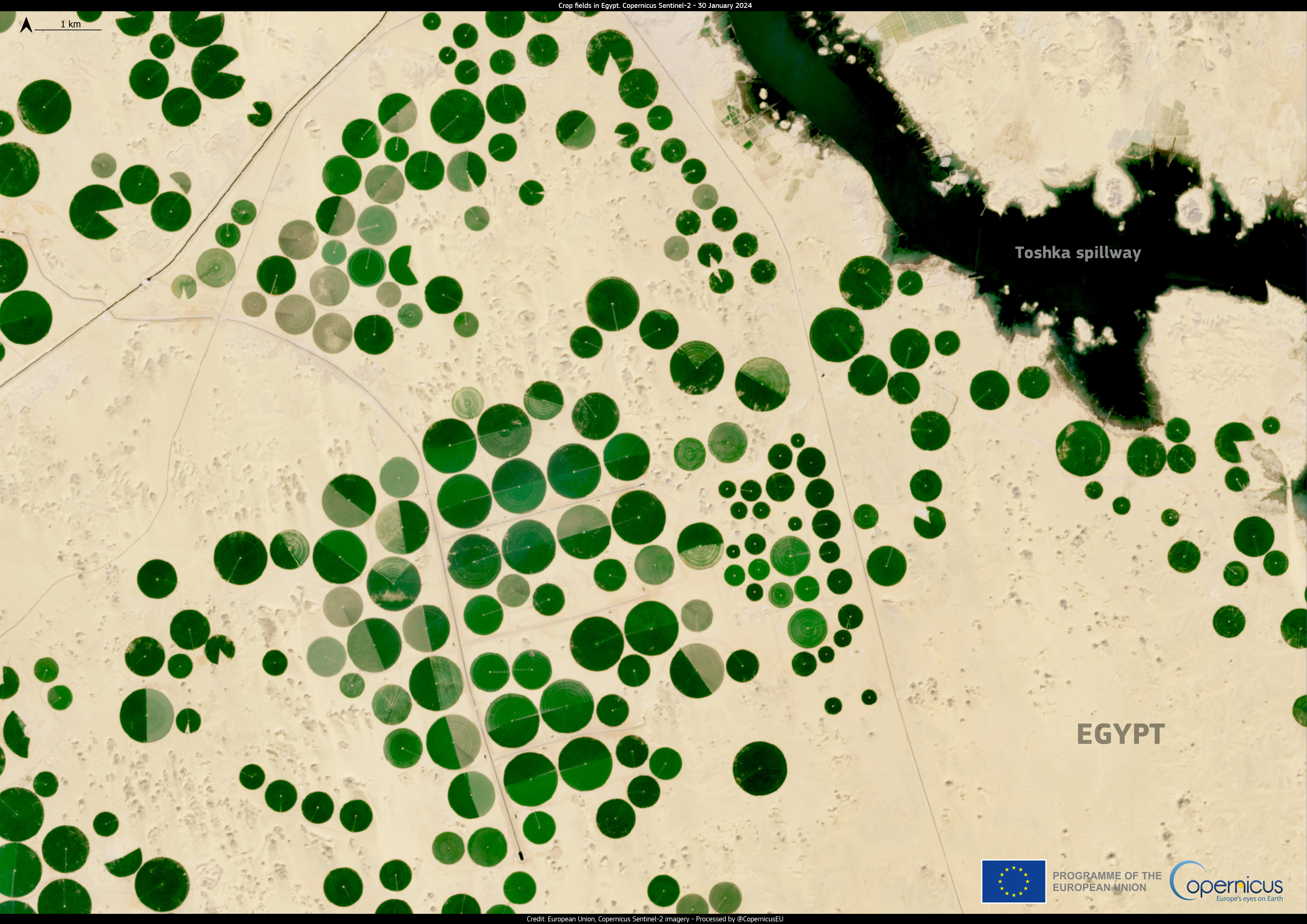
These crops in Egypt (near the Toshka Lakes) are the result of an irrigation system that pumps Nile water out of Lake Nasser.

There is a significant difference in agricultural practices between the northern nations of the Nile Basin (Egypt, Sudan, and South Sudan) and the southern nations (Uganda, Ethiopia, etc). The north is primarily a desert, yet the south receives significant rainfall; crops in the north rely primarily on irrigation, whereas the south relies on rainfall retained in the soil (soil water); crop yields are higher in the north (due to intensive use of fertilizers and pesticides) than in the south; and the north has extensive irrigation infrastructure (dams, canals, etc) supported by governmental policies and international funding sources. The amount of soil water used annually for crops in the south is 229 km^{3}, which is more than twice the total annual water flow of the Nile (about 100 km^{3}). Crop yields in the south are adversely influenced by longer distances to market; in contrast to the north, where nearly all farms are concentrated in a narrow strip along riverbanks with ample transportation opportunities.

The lack of rainfall and groundwater leads Egypt to rely on the Nile for virtually all its water needs. Principal crops grown in Egypt include cotton, wheat, corn, rice, sorghum, and fava beans. There are generally two growing seasons in Egypt: summer (cotton) and winter (grains and vegetables). Since the 1950s, Egypt has increasingly used industrial farming techniques (including extensive use of fertilizers and pesticides) to improve crop yield. Egypt's land is 94% desert and 3% arable land. The vast majority of Egypt's farmland is located in the Nile Delta, with the remainder along the banks of the Nile.

The primary crops in Sudan are peanuts, cotton, sesame, sugarcane, and sorghum. Other crops include millet, wheat, corn, and barley. Sudan's crops draw upon water from both the Blue Nile and White Nile, supported by several dams including the Sennar Dam and Khashm el-Girba Dam. Much of the irrigated land is within the Gezira Scheme, an extensive irrigation project started in the 1920s.

=== Fisheries ===
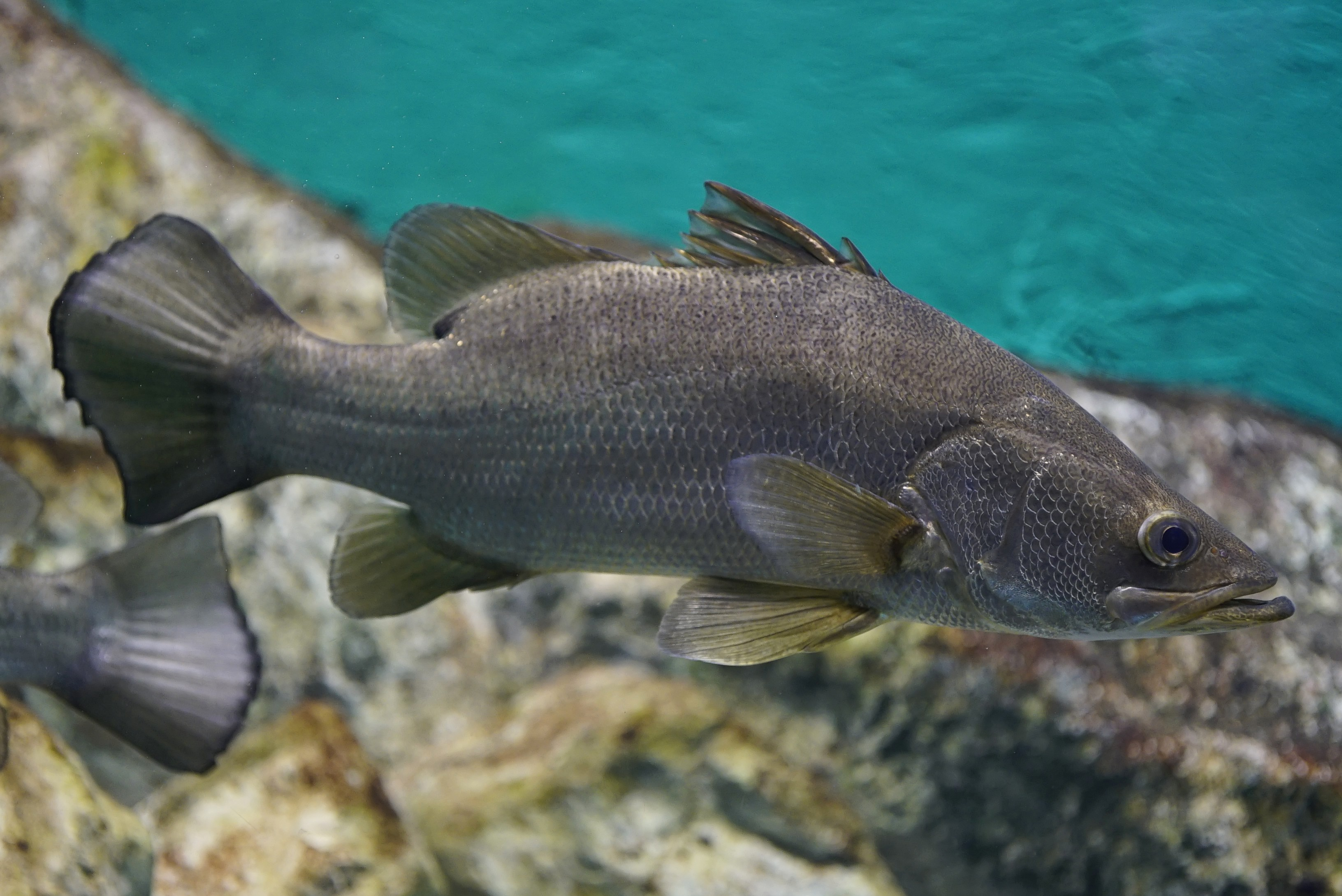
The Nile perch was introduced to Lake Victoria in the 1950s to create a new fishery.

The Nile and its associated lakes have been an important food source for peoples living near the waters since prehistoric times. In the year 2000, the Nile Basin produced about 1.4 million tonnes of fish per year, which is more than half of the total fresh water yield from the entire African continent (2.2 million tonnes). Lake Victoria alone – Africa's largest lake – provided 1 million tonnes. The yield of the lakes of the Nile Basin far exceeds the amount of fish caught in its rivers. All waters of the Nile Basin – with the exception of the Sudd – show evidence of overfishing.

In the 1950s, Nile perch and Nile tilapia were introduced into Lake Victoria in an effort to reverse the shrinking yields of native fishes in the lake; the effort was successful, but led to a decline in the number of native fish species in the lake. Currently, the vast majority of fish caught in Lake Victoria are Nile perch and Silver cyprinid (Lake Victoria sardine). Some fisheries – particularly the Nile perch – are primarily exported to Europe, rather than consumed locally. Fish farming is carried out in some parts of the basin.

=== Hydropower ===
Some hydropower stations on the Nile. "GERD" is the Grand Ethiopian Renaissance Dam.

The Nile and its tributaries power dozens of hydropower stations, which collectively have a capacity to generate over 10 gigawatts (GW) of electrical power. (Note: Total generation capacity for the Nile Basin was computed by summing generation capacity values from the table titled "Major hydropower stations in the Nile Basin". Sources for capacities of individual power stations are identified in that same table.) Prior to the year 2000, there were few dams on the Nile, but thereafter, governments accelerated the pace of dam construction. Hydropower stations with capacities over 100 MW are listed in the table below. (Note: This table only includes hydropower stations with capacities over 100 MW. Smaller stations including Assiut Barrage, Jebel Aulia Dam, Naga Hammadi dam, Esna Power Plant, and Tis Abay I, II are not included. Hydropower stations outside the Nile Basin are not included, such as Ethiopia's Gilgel Gibe Dams I, II, and III.)

Major hydropower stations in the Nile Basin (Note: Colors in the "Landmark" column indicate the country in which the hydropower station is located.)
Hydropower station	Nearby landmark	Year completed	Power (MW, in 2025)	Tributary
Aswan Low Dam	Aswan, Egypt	1902, 1912, 1933, 1985	550	Main Nile
Aswan High Dam	Aswan, Egypt	1970	2,100	Main Nile
Merowe Dam	Merowe, Sudan	2009	1,250	Main Nile
Upper Atbara and Setit	Showak, Sudan	2017	320	Atbarah and Tekezé
Roseires Dam	Er Roseires, Sudan	1966, 2013	280	Blue Nile
Tana Beles	Lake Tana, Ethiopia	2010	460	Beles River, Blue Nile
Tekezé Dam	Tekezé River, Ethiopia	2009	300	Tekezé, Atbarah
Grand Ethiopian Renaissance Dam	Bameza, Ethiopia	2020	5,150	Blue Nile
Fincha	Fincha'a, Ethiopia	1973	134	Blue Nile (Chomen Lake)
Karuma	Karuma Falls, Uganda	2024	600	Victoria Nile
Isimba	Kamuli District, Uganda	2019	183	Victoria Nile
Bujagali	Bujagali Falls, Uganda	2012	250	Victoria Nile
Kiira	Kimaka, Uganda	2003	200	Victoria Nile
Nalubaale	Jinja, Uganda	1954	180	Victoria Nile

=== Transportation ===
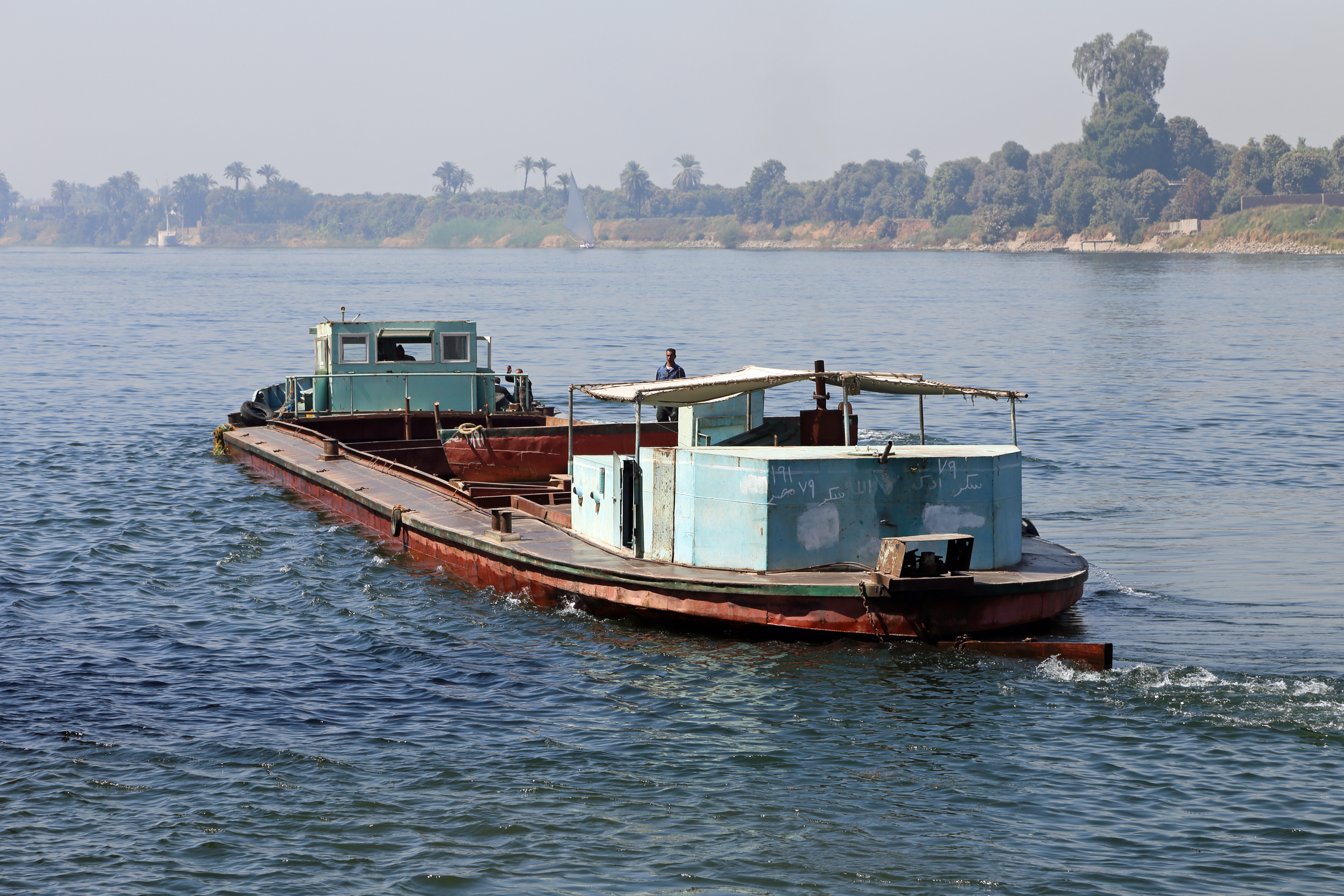
Barges – like this one near Luxor, Egypt – are used to carry cargo on the river.

The Nile has a flatter gradient in the north relative to the mountainous southern region – so the northern countries (Egypt, Sudan, and South Sudan) have more navigable stretches of water. In Egypt, the river has no major obstacles between the delta and the first cataract at Aswan, and as a consequence that stretch has been utilized heavily for transportation. That stretch could be used even before the arrival of steamships, because currents could carry boats downstream, and winds from the north often helped sailboats travel upstream. The Blue Nile is generally not navigable in most places. Instead of the river, Ethiopians and Italian colonizers used an overland route – the Strada Imperiale – for north-south transportation in Ethiopia. As recently as 1903, explorers were still researching the Blue Nile to see if it could be used for transportation between Ethiopia and Sudan, but were not successful.

In ancient Egypt, the river was the primary mode of transportation, and a wide variety of boats were built – both utilitarian and ceremonial. Egyptian boats were sufficiently sturdy to carry large obelisks and stones for building pyramids and temples. (Note: Artwork showing an obelisk on a boat is in the Deir el-Bahari mortuary temples. The Nile River used to be much closer to the Giza Pyramid Complex than it is today, enabling boats to bring stones close to the construction site.) In the modern era, the river is still used for transportation, particularly in Egypt, which has four navigable waterways suitable for large ships: two in the delta, one between the delta and the Aswan High Dam, and one in Lake Nasser. Egypt moves 500 million tonnes of cargo on the river per year, which is only about 0.8% of Egypt's total freight movement (the vast majority of freight moves by road or railway). (Note: Data regarding Egyptian waterborne cargo is from 2023.) Cargo transported on the river includes cement, limestone, coal, petroleum products, and phosphates.

Upstream from Lake Nasser, the Nile and its tributaries contain waterfalls, cataracts, rapids, and dams that make long-distance navigation difficult. Another obstacle to navigation is the Sudd, a large swampy wetland on the White Nile in South Sudan. Plans to build a canal through the swamp – called the Jonglei Canal – were initiated in the early 20th century with the goal of providing more water to grow cotton in Egypt. Construction was briefly started in 1978, but the endeavor was soon halted.

=== Tourism and recreation ===
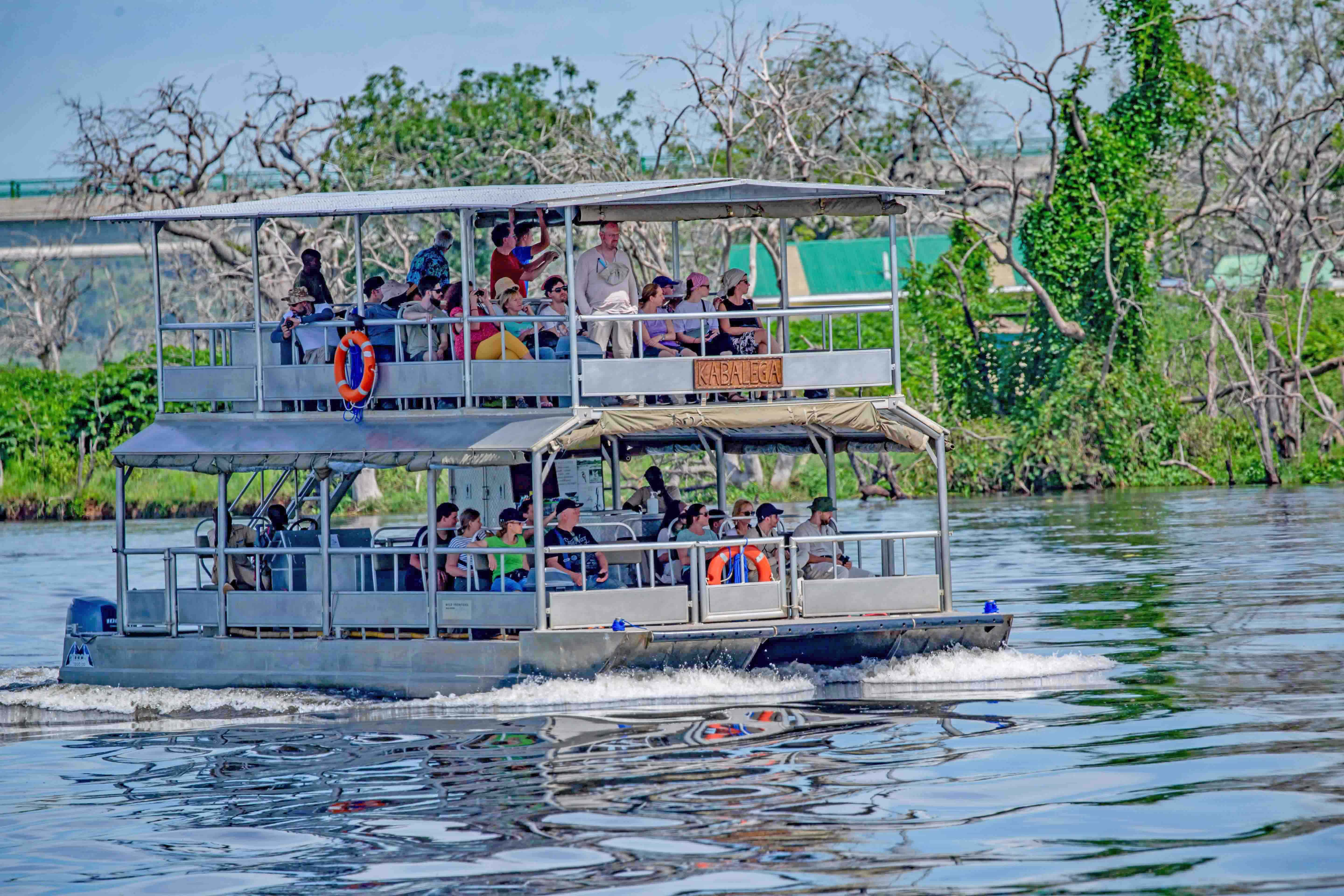
Several parts of the river attract tourists. This boat is viewing Murchison Falls on the White Nile, between Lake Victoria and Lake Albert.

The Nile – in particular, the stretch in Egypt – has been one of the world's most popular tourist destinations for millennia, and has been the subject of a vast amount of travel literature. (Note: In 1992, Smithsonian librarian Martin R. Kalfatovic documented 1,150 books that described travels on the Nile.) One of the most visited destinations along the Nile is the Giza pyramid complex – about 9 kilometers (5.6 mi) from the modern course of the Nile in Cairo – which has been a tourist destination since the time of the Greeks.

The stretch of the Nile between Cairo and Aswan has long been a popular destination for tourists: during celebrations surrounding the opening of the Suez Canal in 1870, a large group of tourists took a boat ride on that stretch of the river and visited Luxor, Dendera, Saqqara, Edfu, and Philae. One of the world's first travel agencies, Thomas Cook & Son, started offering tours of the river in 1870 when the Suez Canal opened, and started regular steamboat cruises on the Nile in 1875. Since the construction of the Aswan High Dam in 1970, the dam itself has become a tourist attraction, along with the nearby temples that were moved during construction to avoid becoming submerged. The Aswan High Dam also benefited the cruise industry because the river from Aswan to the delta became safely navigable all year.

The Nile Basin is home to several parks and nature reserves, including Uganda's Murchison Falls National Park and Egypt's Salouga and Ghazal Protected Area. The Bujagali Falls were once among Africa's most notable rafting sites, but have become submerged due to construction of the Bujagali Power Station.

== In culture ==
=== Art and literature ===
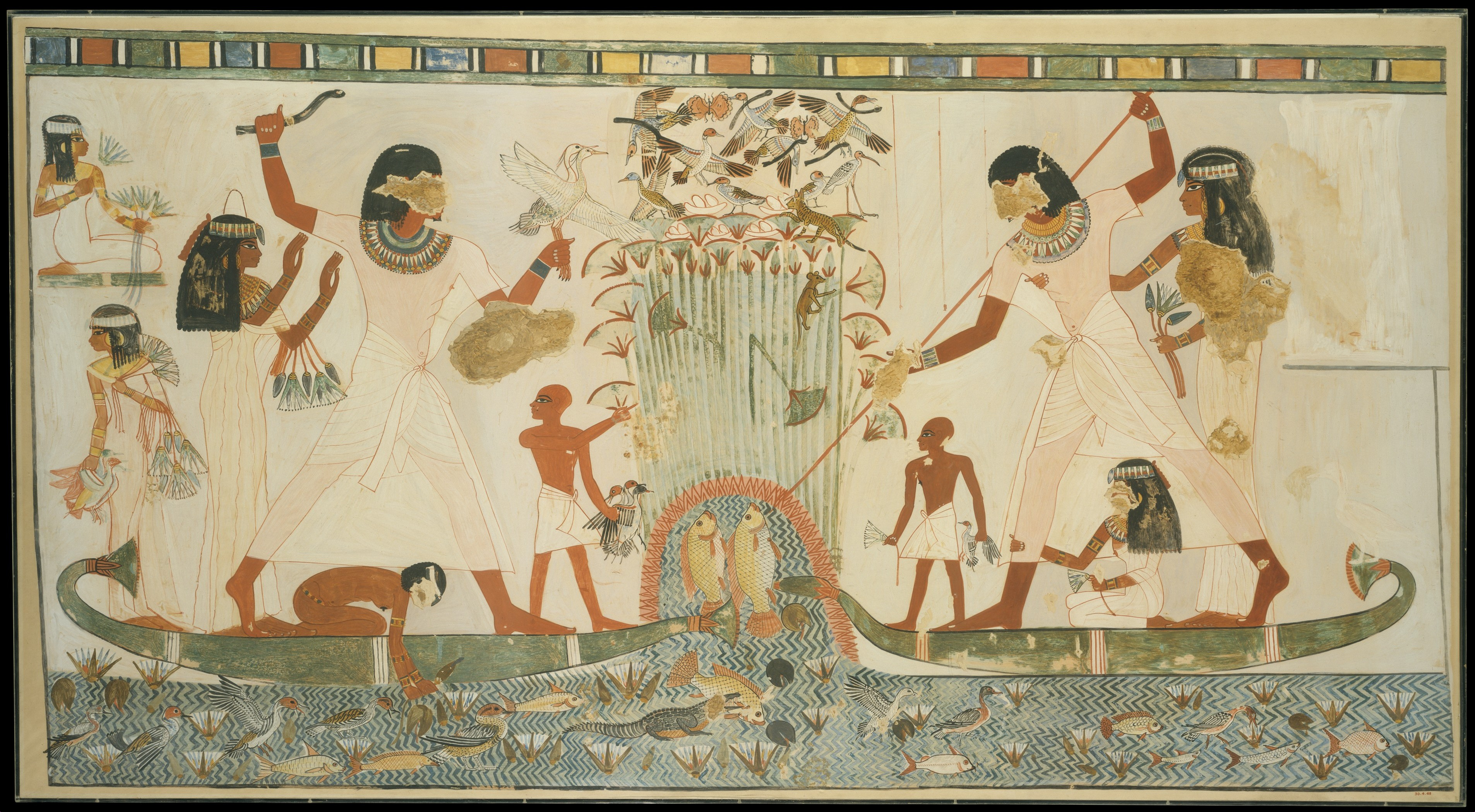
This ancient Egyptian artwork, "Menna and Family Hunting in the Marshes", is within the Tomb of Menna in the Theban Necropolis.

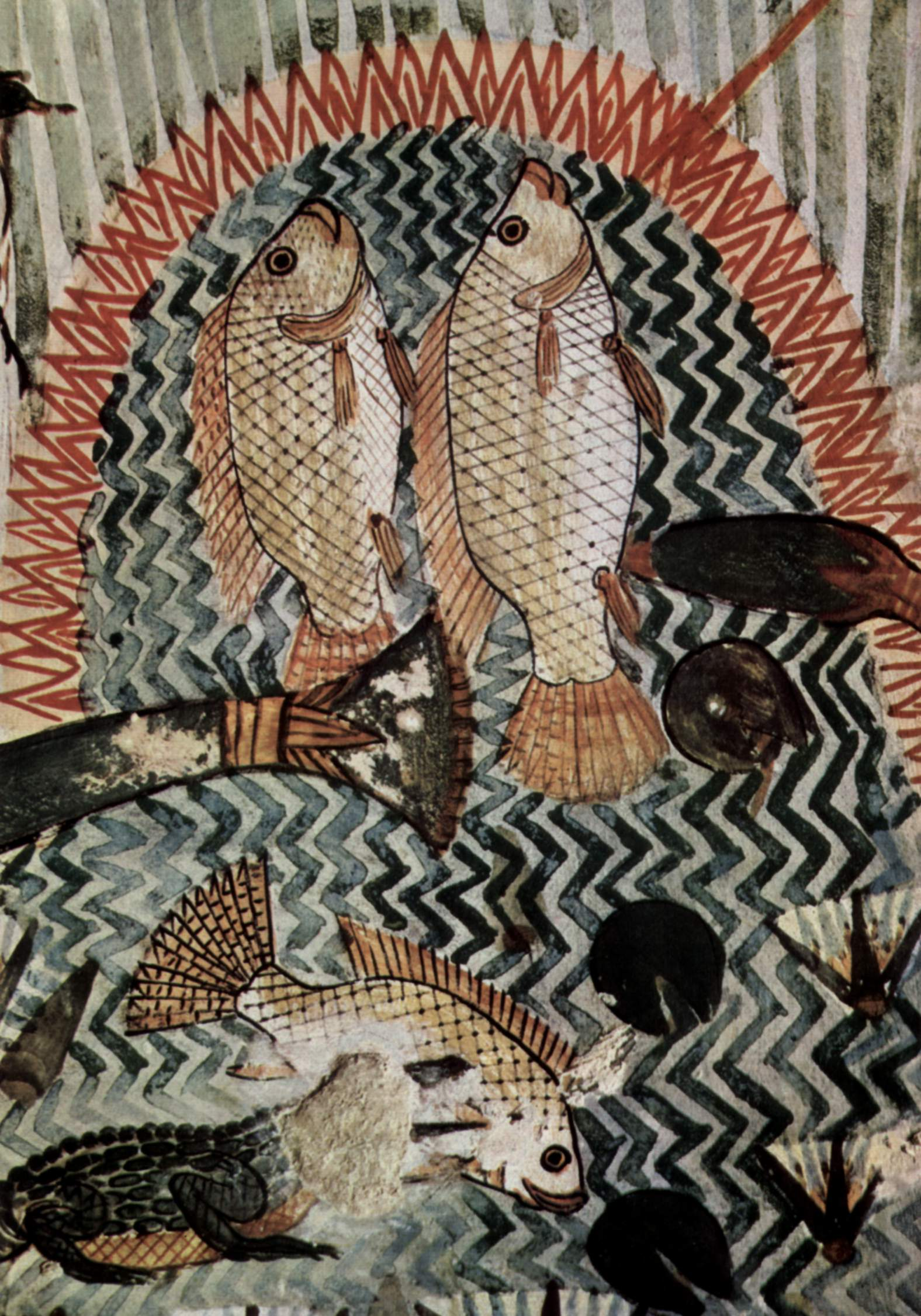
A Nile crocodile eating fish (Note: Detail of larger artwork in the Tomb of Menna in the Theban Necropolis)

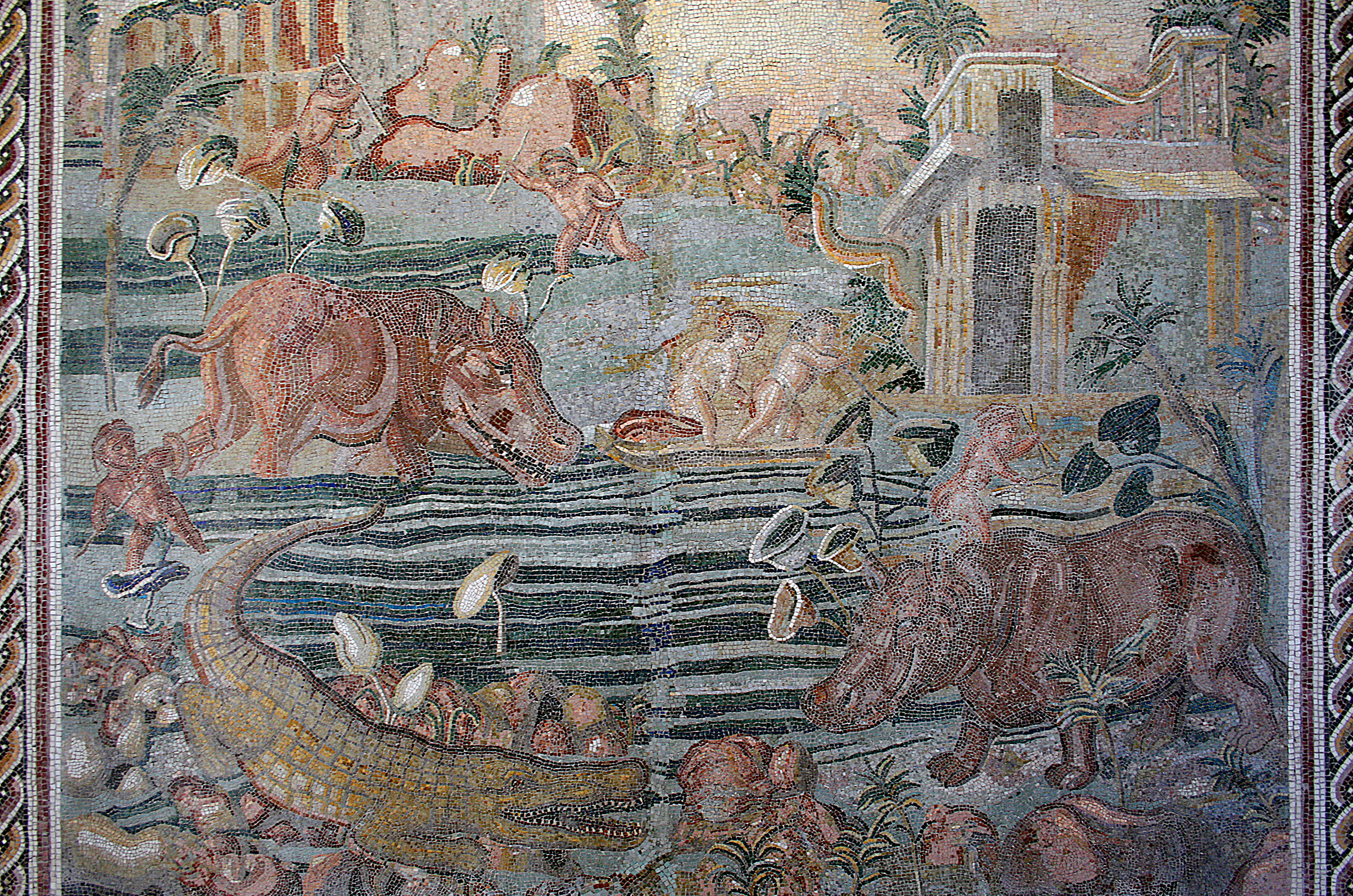
Nilotic landscapes, such as this 2nd century Roman mosaic, often displayed crocodiles and hippos.

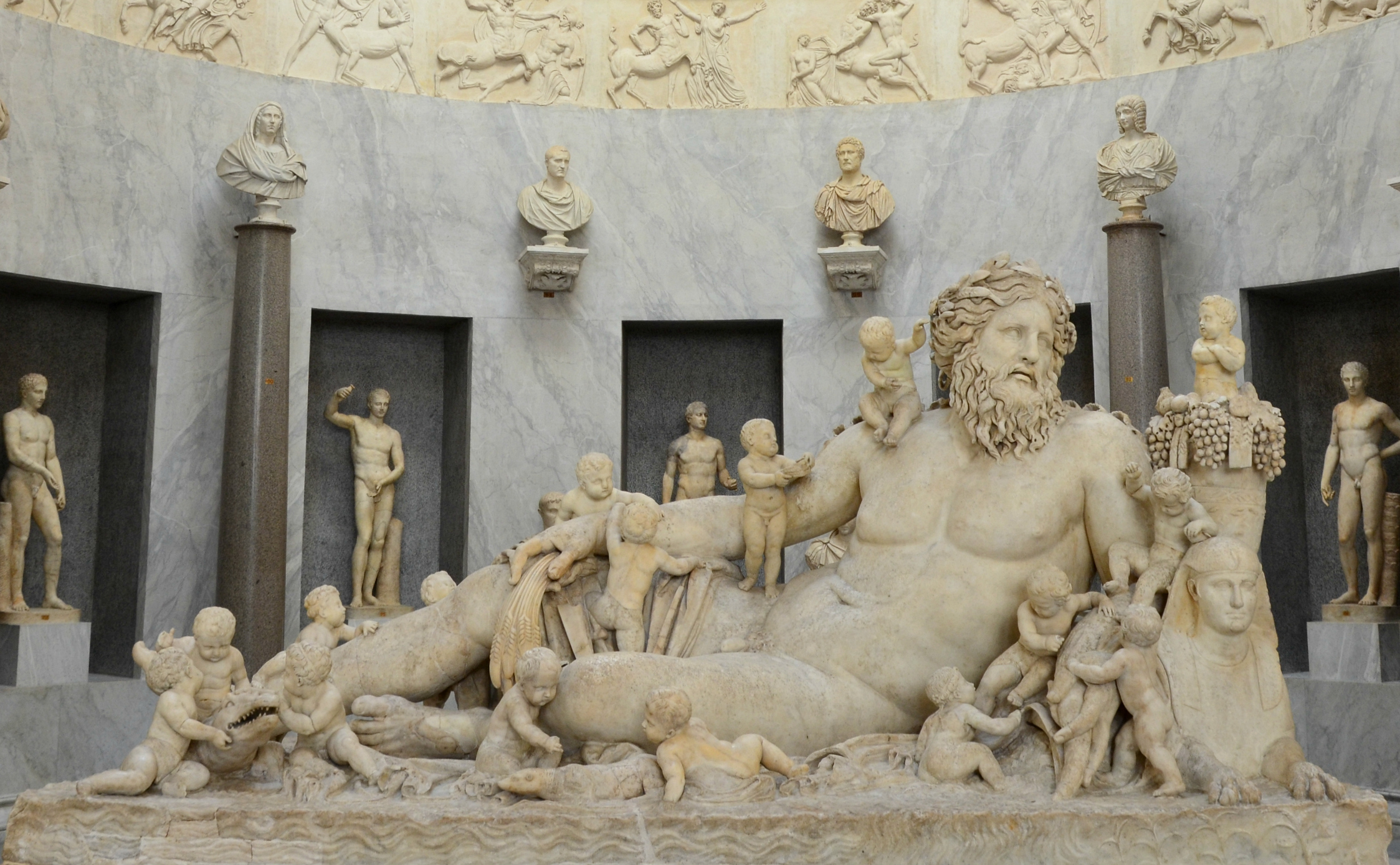
Personification of the River Nile is a colossal marble sculpture from c. 2nd century CE Rome – now in the Vatican Museum.

The river was frequently featured in ancient Egyptian art, often with kings fishing or harpooning hippopotamuses. Landscape artworks featuring the Nile – either directly or allegorically – are called nilotic landscapes. Nilotic landscapes are characterized by a river scene featuring plant and animal life, much of which is native to Egypt. Common elements include papyrus, palm trees, fish and water birds, and – less often – felines, monkeys, and crocodile.

Nilotic landscapes are also represented in artwork from ancient Greece and ancient Rome. Imperial Roman Nilotic art places greater emphasis on fierce animals, usually including crocodiles and hippopotamuses. A notable representation of the Nile in art is the Personification of the River Nile, a colossal marble sculpture from c. 2nd century CE Rome – now in the Vatican Museum. (Note: A colossal sculpture is one twice life size or larger.) The Nile is represented as a reclining man holding sheaves of wheat in his hand. At his side are a sphinx – representing Egypt – and sixteen children who allude to sixteen cubits (the ideal height of the annual flood). At the base are crocodiles, pygmies, and hippopotamuses.

The Nile is seen in artworks that feature four major rivers of the world: Nile (Africa), Danube (Europe), Ganges (Asia), and Río de la Plata (Americas). Examples include the painting The Four Rivers of Paradise by Peter Paul Rubens (1615) and the fountain in Rome Fontana dei Quattro Fiumi designed by Gian Lorenzo Bernini (1651). In Bernini's fountain, the Nile is depicted as a man with his head covered in a cloth, symbolizing the mystery of the unknown source of the Nile.

The Hymn to the Nile was composed and sung by the ancient Egyptian peoples; it celebrated the flooding of the Nile and the benefits it brought to Egyptian civilization. Giuseppe Verdi was commissioned by Isma'il Pasha to compose an opera to celebrate the opening of the Suez Canal. The opera, Aida, was performed at the newly-constructed Egyptian Royal Opera House in 1871. The opera's third act is set on the banks of the Nile. Since the start of construction of the Grand Ethiopian Renaissance Dam, Ethiopian musicians have produced songs that celebrate and glorify the Nile and the dam.

William Shakespeare has the character Marc Antony describe the Nile floods in the play Antony and Cleopatra: "Thus do they, sir: they take the flow o' the Nile By certain scales i' the pyramid; they know, By the height, the lowness, or the mean, if dearth Or foison follow: the higher Nilus swells, The more it promises: as it ebbs, the seedsman Upon the slime and ooze scatters his grain, And shortly comes to harvest." (Note: Quote from Antony and Cleopatra (Act 2, Scene 7). "Foison" means a rich harvest.)

Agatha Christie wrote the popular 1937 mystery novel Death on the Nile, about a murder on a Nile steamboat, which inspired several adaptations. Adrift on the Nile is a 1966 novel by Egyptian author and Nobel Prize winner Naguib Mahfouz about a young man who lives aboard a houseboat on the Nile. The river is a metaphor for a life that he cannot control, leading him to turn his back on society. The Nile plays a prominent role in several video games, including Civilization VI.

=== Myth and religion ===
The Egyptian god Hapy was responsible for the annual Nile floods.

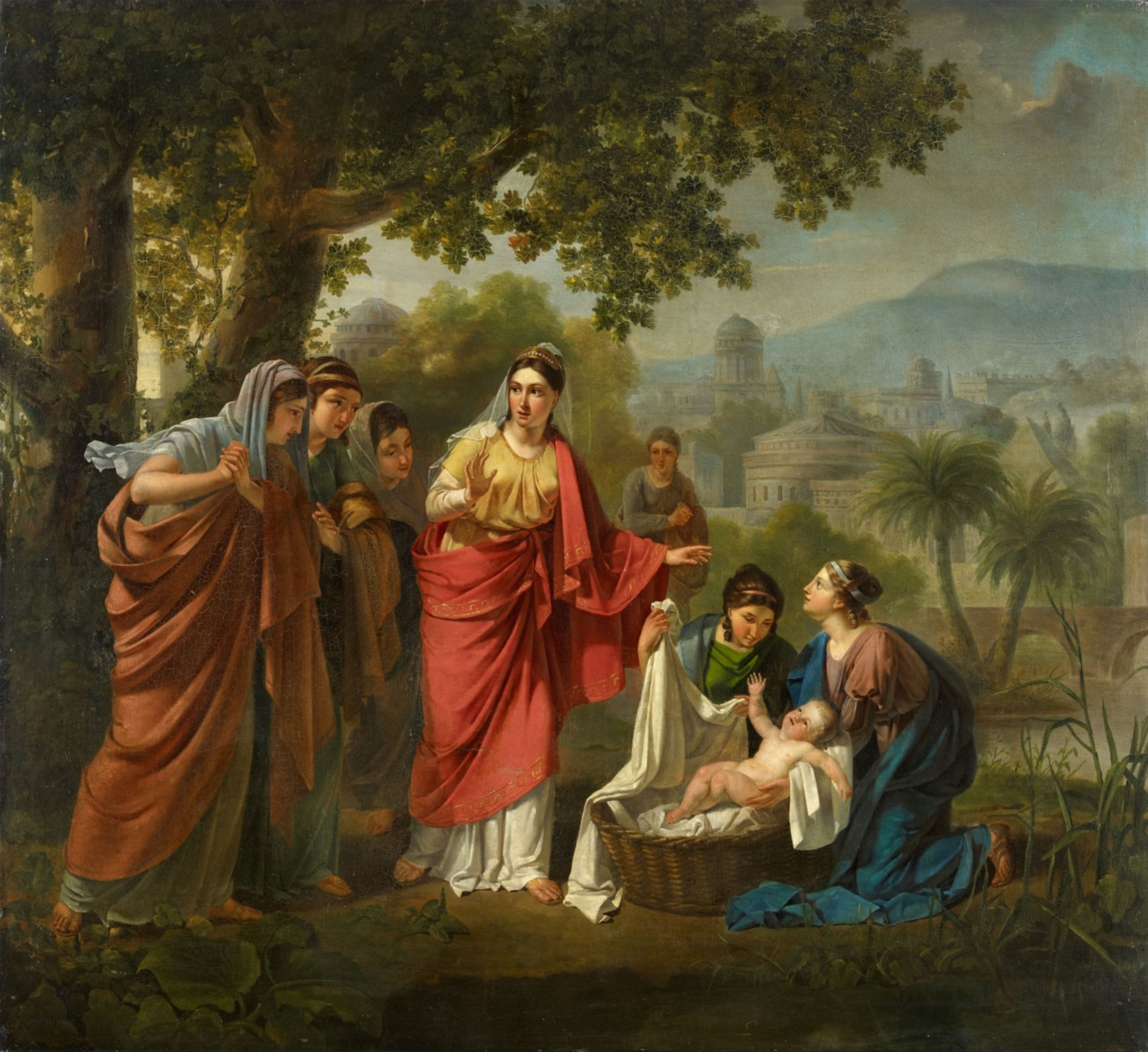
The Hebrew Bible contains a story about the infant Moses being rescued from the Nile.

The cosmology of the ancient Egyptians was cyclic in nature: rather than viewing life as having a start and end, it was viewed as a perpetual cycle. This cyclic life-view was rooted in the natural world that surrounded the Egyptians, the daily passage of the sun, and the annual floods of the Nile. The sun god Ra passed through the sky each day from east to west, and the three phases of the day (sunrise, daytime, and sunset) corresponded to the human lifecycle: birth, life, and death. For this reason, many burial sites were positioned on the west bank of the Nile, where they would be closer to the setting sun. (Note: The west side of the river is where many Egyptian funerary monuments are located, including the Giza pyramid complex, the Memphite Necropolis, and the Valley of the Kings.)

In the ancient Egyptian religion, no single god personified the Nile in the same way that the god Ra personified the sun. Gods associated with the river included Hapy (god of the annual floods) and Khnum (god of the first cataract), who were jointly responsible for producing the annual Nile flood that fertilized the country's farmland. The Egyptian religion placed the source of the Nile's annual flood at Elephantine Island (at the first cataract) where the floodwaters were believed to flow up out of the netherworld.

Isis was a major deity in the Egyptian religion, strongly associated with the Nile. Cults based on Isis spread from Egypt into Europe in the second century BCE. An example of the influence of the cult of Isis in Europe is the Nile mosaic of Palestrina, located in Rome and dated to the first century BCE: the 4 by 3 meter mosaic depicts a detailed Nilotic landscape.

In Greek mythology, Nilus is the god of the Nile, one of thousands of river-god children of Titans Oceanus and his sister-wife Tethys. Nilus was father of the naiad Memphis, mythical founder of the city of Memphis.

The Nile is mentioned in the Bible dozens of times, including a story in the Book of Exodus about the infant Moses being placed in a basket in the river. Some authorities identify the river Gihon – which is mentioned in the Book of Genesis as one of the four Rivers of Paradise – as the Nile. A story particularly important to the Coptic peoples of Egypt is found in the Book of Matthew: it recounts how Joseph and Mary fled to Egypt and lived near the Nile for several years, thus avoiding Herod.
