= Wad Zayed Airport =

Airport in Sudan

- Airport
- Country: Sudan
- State: Al Qadarif State
- Time zone: UTC+2 (CAT)

Wad Zayed Airport is an airport near Showak in Al Qadarif State, Sudan.

== History ==
The airport, which began as an unpaved airstrip known as Al-Showak Airport, later took the name Wad Zayed in tribute to Nazir Mahmoud Issa Wad Zayed (1821-1896).

On 12 May 2024, the Sudanese Armed Forces claimed to have shot down two drones targeting Wad Zayed Airport.

== See also ==
- List of airports in Sudan
