= Showak =

Showak الشواك (in Arabic)
- Town
- Location in Sudan
- Coordinates: 14°23′N 35°52′E
- Country: Sudan
- State: Al Qadarif
- Elevation: 516 m (1,693 ft)
- Time zone: UTC+3 (EAT)

Showak (also Ash Showak or el Showak) (Arabic: االشواك, romanized: A'shou-wāk), is the capital of the Al Fushqa District located on the Atbarah River in eastern Gedarif State, Sudan, at an altitude of 516 meters (1,693 feet) above sea level. It lies at a distance of 381 kilometres (237 mi) to the northeast of Khartoum. Showak is a major transport hub between Gedaref, the state capital and Kassala city.

The national highway linking Khartoum and the rest of the country with Port Sudan, as well as the railway line parallel to it, passes through Showak. Showak has the largest cattle market in the state and contains a special clinic, affiliated with Khartoum University, which treats camels. It also hosts a large UN Refugees camp in its vicinity known as the Shagarab Refugees camp and is home to the Sudanese headquarters of the United Nations High Commissioner for Refugees. There is one hospital in the town, Ash Showak Rural Hospital, and a branch of the Agricultural Bank of Sudan, located in the town's main market.

== History ==
During the Third Sudanese civil war, 6 unidentified drones had attacked the town's power station lead to a power outage in the states of Al-Qadarif and Kassala.

== Climate ==
Showak has a hot semi-arid climate (Köppen climate classification BSh) with two distinct seasons: a short, sweltering and extremely oppressive wet season from mid-June to mid-September and a sweltering, desiccating dry season covering the rest of the year.

Climate data for Showak (1961-1990)
Month	Jan	Feb	Mar	Apr	May	Jun	Jul	Aug	Sep	Oct	Nov	Dec	Year
Record high °C (°F)	40.3 (104.5)	43.6 (110.5)	45.2 (113.4)	46.0 (114.8)	45.7 (114.3)	44.5 (112.1)	40.8 (105.4)	40.7 (105.3)	41.0 (105.8)	41.5 (106.7)	41.0 (105.8)	40.1 (104.2)	46.0 (114.8)
Mean daily maximum °C (°F)	34.5 (94.1)	36.6 (97.9)	39.3 (102.7)	41.5 (106.7)	41.1 (106.0)	38.7 (101.7)	34.9 (94.8)	33.9 (93.0)	35.5 (95.9)	37.9 (100.2)	37.4 (99.3)	35.3 (95.5)	37.2 (99.0)
Daily mean °C (°F)	24.8 (76.6)	26.5 (79.7)	29.5 (85.1)	31.8 (89.2)	33.1 (91.6)	31.4 (88.5)	28.6 (83.5)	27.9 (82.2)	28.8 (83.8)	29.9 (85.8)	28.3 (82.9)	26.0 (78.8)	28.9 (84.0)
Mean daily minimum °C (°F)	15.1 (59.2)	16.5 (61.7)	19.7 (67.5)	22.1 (71.8)	25.1 (77.2)	24.1 (75.4)	22.3 (72.1)	21.9 (71.4)	22.1 (71.8)	22.0 (71.6)	19.3 (66.7)	16.7 (62.1)	20.6 (69.1)
Record low °C (°F)	8.3 (46.9)	8.2 (46.8)	9.0 (48.2)	12.6 (54.7)	17.0 (62.6)	17.7 (63.9)	18.3 (64.9)	13.7 (56.7)	17.5 (63.5)	14.4 (57.9)	10.8 (51.4)	7.8 (46.0)	7.8 (46.0)
Average rainfall mm (inches)	0.5 (0.02)	0.0 (0.0)	0.9 (0.04)	3.2 (0.13)	18.8 (0.74)	70.8 (2.79)	166.2 (6.54)	148.1 (5.83)	70.1 (2.76)	21.9 (0.86)	1.4 (0.06)	0.0 (0.0)	501.9 (19.77)
Average rainy days (≥ 0.1 mm)	0.0	0.0	0.1	0.8	3.9	8.0	11.1	11.2	7.1	2.6	0.3	0.0	45.1
Average relative humidity (%)	35	29	24	22	29	40	56	61	55	41	33	34	38.2
Mean monthly sunshine hours	313.1	282.8	303.8	315.0	300.7	285.0	251.1	238.7	267.0	291.4	306.0	310.0	3,464.6
Percentage possible sunshine	89	87	81	83	75	69	62	61	73	80	83	89	78
Source: NOAA

== Transport ==
- Wad Zayed Airport
