= Fisheries Survey of Lake Victoria =

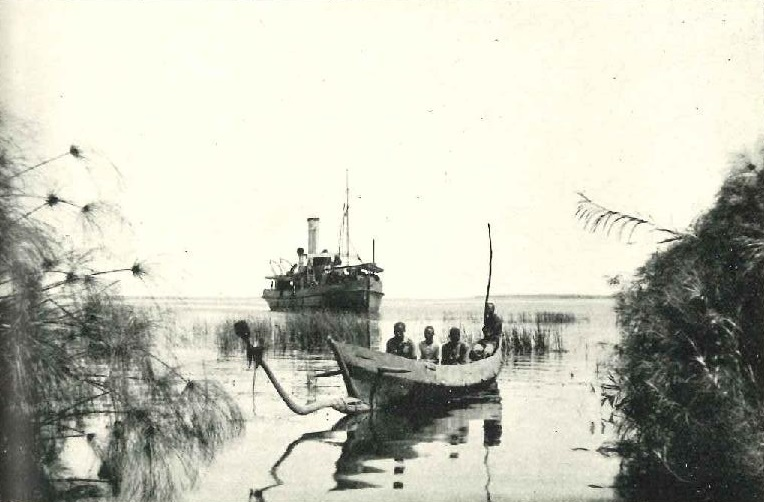
The SS Kavirondo and a canoe at Port Victoria during the 1927 fisheries survey of Lake Victoria

Lake Victoria supports Africa's largest inland fishery, with the majority of present catch being the invasive Nile perch, introduced to the Lake in the 1950s. Prior to the introduction of Nile perch as well as Nile tilapia, the fish community was very different and consisted mainly of 'Ngege' (Oreochromis esculentus) and Victoria tilapia (O. variabilis) as well as vast numbers of Haplochromis species. Fish communities in the first half of the 20th century are known primarily from a unique fisheries survey conducted in 1927-1928 by the Colonial Office.

In 1927 Michael Graham was sent from the fisheries laboratory in Lowestoft, together with ecologist Edgar Barton Worthington to spend a year surveying fisheries in Lake Nyanza (Lake Victoria). This unique survey represents the first ever systematic characterisation of Lake Victoria fish populations.

The original hand-written 'Naturalists Logbooks' from this survey have recently been re-discovered in the archive of the Centre for Environment, Fisheries and Aquaculture Science (Cefas). These are now being digitized and made available to researchers seeking a 'baseline' against which subsequent changes can be compared.

On 13 December 1928, Certificates of recommendation were received by the Linnean Society for election of Michael Graham to Fellowship status. Michael Graham read his paper on The Natural History of the Victoria Nyanza, at the Linnean Society on 24 May 1929. Edgar Barton Worthington went on to become the first full-time director of the Freshwater Biological Association (1937–46). In 1930, Worthington married Stella Johnson, who had been a member of the earlier expedition and who shared many of his interests. In 1933, they jointly published the book Inland Waters of Africa: The Result of Two Expeditions to the Great Lakes of Kenya and Uganda, with Accounts of Their Biology, Native Tribes and Development.

== Survey details ==
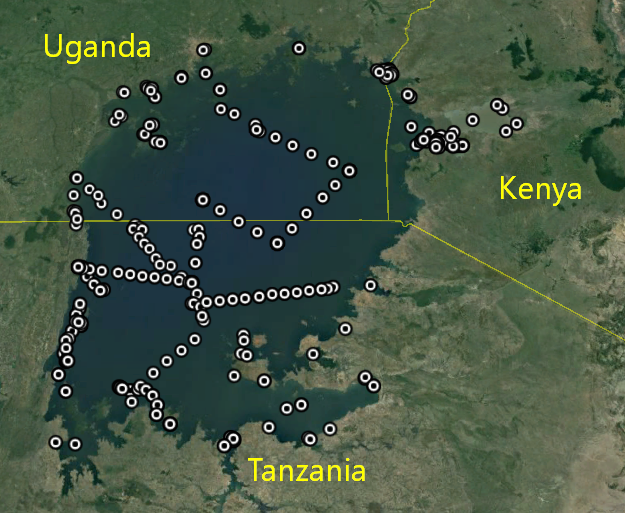
Sampling positions during the 1927/28 fisheries survey of Lake Victoria

A total of 235 separate stations were surveyed between 22 August 1927 and 19 February 1928, using a wide variety of different fishing gears and techniques. Fish were captured using three different mesh sizes of gill net, as well as trammel nets, a small beam trawl, cast nets, surface and bottom lines, and native basket trawls, papyrus seines ("Ngogo") or fishing weirs ("keks"). Other equipment used during the survey included: secchi disc, plankton nets, Nansen's and Apstein's nets, water sample bottles, a Peterson grab, drift-bottles, a Hardy plankton recorder and sounding lines. Environmental parameters measured included: temperature (air and water), depth, pH, water transparency (Secchi depth). Detailed observations were made of local fishing practices and the composition of commercial catches at sites all around the lake. The steam tug SS Kavirondo was chartered from the Kenya and Uganda Railway for the six months in order to deploy fishing gears and provide transportation.

== Key findings - fish populations during the 1920s ==
During his survey of Lake Victoria, Michael Graham recorded fifty-eight species of Haplochromis including many new species. While Graham regretted that the enormous haplochromine population was not really 'useful', he warned against introduction of a large predator that could convert these small fish – which the colonial fisheries officers called trash fish – into large fish that could be caught for food. The leading candidate at that time was the Nile perch, which already lived in nearby Lake Albert. At the time Graham wrote "The introduction of a large predatory species from another area would be attended with the upmost danger, unless preceded by extensive research into the probable effects of this operation". In a footnote he added that his warning had just been strengthened by a recent research report from Lake Albert, which described how rare the tilapia had become.

Haplochromine species accounted for some 80% of the fish biomass of the lake, an abundance which led Graham to believe that this species flock could support a trawler fishery of up to 200 boats. It also meant that Lake Victoria at one time boasted one of the most diverse fish communities on earth. With such diversity, the cichlids managed to exploit virtually every food source available, including most detritus, zooplankton and phytoplankton.

Disregarding the haplochromines, the dominant species in the 1927/8 survey catches were two, now critically endangered tilapia species, the 'Ngege' or Singida tilapia (Oreochromis esculentus) and Victoria tilapia (O. variabilis). Other commonly observed species included: Marbled lungfish (Protopterus aethiopicus), Elephant-snout fish (Mormyrus kannume), Ripon barbel (Labeobarbus altianalis), African sharptooth catfish (Clarias gariepinus), silver butter catfish (Schilbe intermedius) and Semutundu (Bagrus docmak). The most common Haplochromis species were suggested to be Haplochromis guiarti and Haplochromis cinereus. Survey catches included several Haplochromis species that are now thought to be extinct, including: Haplochromis flavipinnis, Haplochromis gowersii, Haplochromis longirostris, Haplochromis macrognathus, Haplochromis michaeli,Haplochromis nigrescens, Haplochromis prognathus. The specific name Haplochromis michaeli honours the collector of the type, Michael Graham (1888-1972). Several species were also named after Edgar Barton Worthington, namely Haplochromis bartoni and H. worthingtoni.

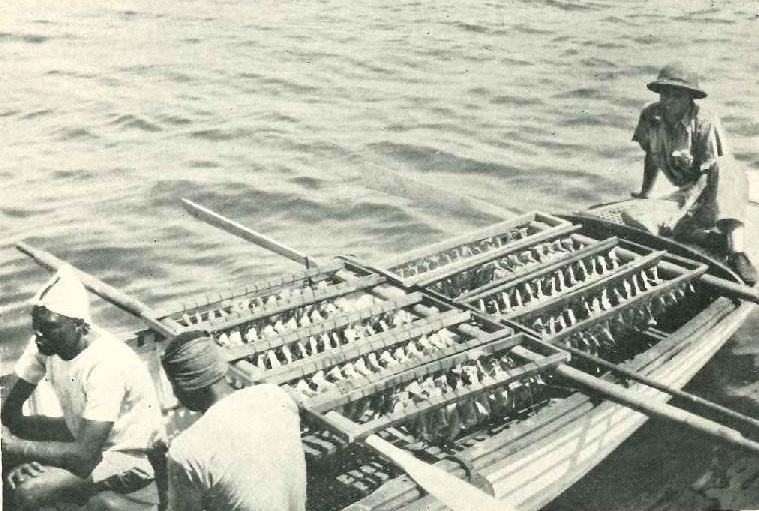
Filleted Ngege Oreochromis esculentus being brought ashore in 1927

In the official report of the expedition, Michael Graham wrote that "The ngege or satu Tilapia esculenta, is the most important food fish of the lake, whether for native or non-native consumption. It is convenient size for trade, travels well and is found in much greater numbers than other important fish, such as semutundu (Luganda), Bagrus sp.''. Furthermore, Graham noted that "The introduction of the European flax gill-net of 5 inch mesh has undoubtedly caused a diminution in the number of ngege in those parts of the Kavirondo Gulf, the northern shore of the lake, the Sesse Islands and Smith's Sound which are conveniently situated to markets".

Importantly, in the report written by Michael Graham, there is very little mention of the Lake Victoria sardine or silver cyprinid (Rastrineobola argentea), which now supports major commercial fisheries and is important for food security throughout eastern and southern Africa. Although this species was already locally known as 'omena' in Kenya, 'mukene' in Uganda or 'nsalali' in Tanzania and its artisanal exploitation was reported long before, it was largely unknown to most commercial fishermen until the 1960s.

== See also ==
- Centre for Environment, Fisheries and Aquaculture Science
- Fisheries science
- Fishing on Lake Victoria
- Nile perch
