= Fishing on Lake Victoria =

Inland fishery in Africa

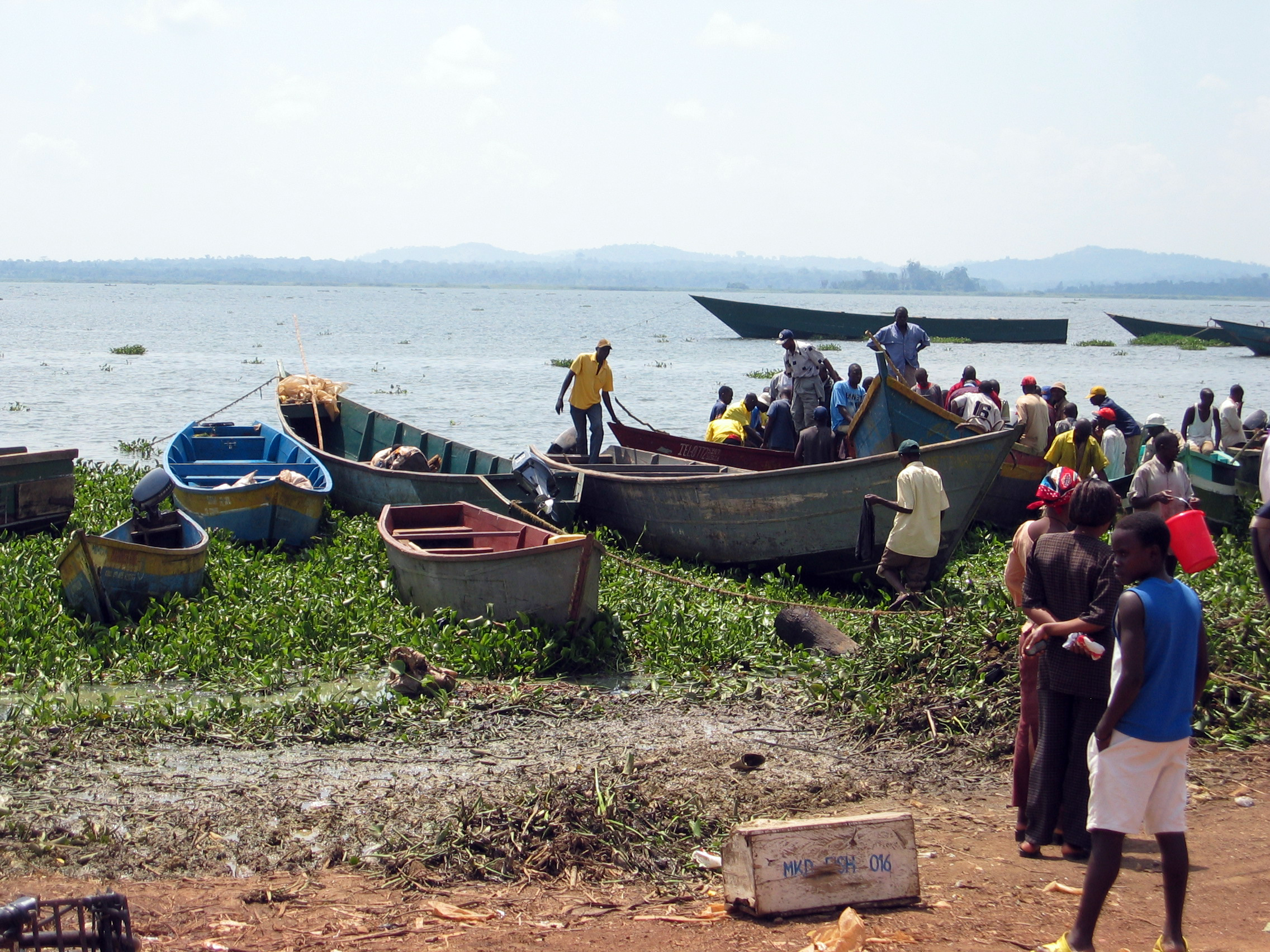
Fishing boats return laden with tilapia at Ggaba Landing Site, Uganda.

Lake Victoria supports Africa's largest inland fishery, with the majority of the catch being the invasive Nile perch, introduced in the Lake in the 1950s.

== History ==
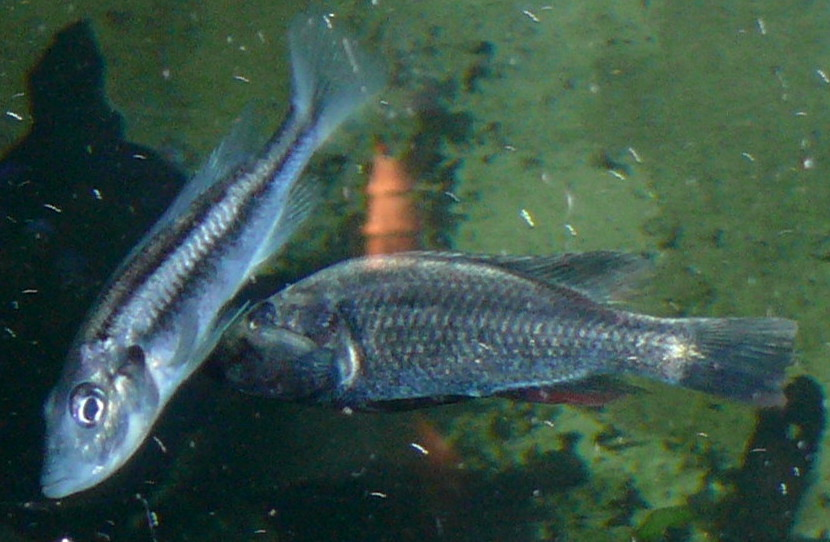
The cichlid Haplochromis thereuterion is endemic to Lake Victoria.

In 1927-1928 Michael Graham conducted the first ever systematic Fisheries Survey of Lake Victoria. The dominant species in the 1927–8 survey catches were two, now critically endangered tilapia species, the 'Ngege' or Singida tilapia (Oreochromis esculentus) and Victoria tilapia (O. variabilis). Other commonly observed species included: Marbled lungfish (Protopterus aethiopicus), Elephant-snout fish (Mormyrus kannume), Ripon barbel (Labeobarbus altianalis), African sharptooth catfish (Clarias gariepinus), silver butter catfish (Schilbe intermedius) and Semutundu (Bagrus docmak). The most common Haplochromis species were suggested to be Haplochromis guiarti and Haplochromis cinereus.

In his official report of the survey, Graham wrote that "The ngege or satu Tilapia esculenta, is the most important food fish of the lake, whether for native or non-native consumption. No other fish equals it in the quality of the flesh. It is convenient size for trade, travels well and is found in much greater numbers than other important fish, such as semutundu (Luganda), Bagrus sp.''. Furthermore, Graham noted that the introduction of the European flax gill-net of 5 inch mesh had undoubtedly caused a diminution in the number of ngege in those parts of the Kavirondo Gulf, the northern shore of the lake, the Sesse Islands and Smith's Sound that were conveniently situated close to markets.

Before 1954, Lake Victoria's ecology was characterised by enormous biodiversity. It was inhabited by over 500 species of fish, 90% of which were cichlids belonging to the haplochromines. They are thought to have evolved in Lake Victoria within the last 15,000 years. They are known for their extraordinary ability to evolve rapidly to suit extremely localised and diverse environments, a characteristic termed 'evolutionary plasticity'. This ability has made the cichlid species of Lake Victoria an extremely successful fish. Haplochromine species accounted for some 80% of the fish biomass of the lake, an abundance which led Graham to believe that this species flock could support a trawler fishery of up to 200 boats. It also meant that Lake Victoria at one time boasted one of the most diverse fish environments on earth. With such diversity, the cichlids of Lake Victoria managed to exploit virtually every food source available, including most detritus, zooplankton and phytoplankton.

Haplochromine species are relatively small and bony, and were generally not favoured in catches. Riparian populations preferred the lake's two endemic species of tilapia (Oreochromis esculentus and O. variabilis). (Note: See for example Graham (1929) and Beverton (1959).) Hence, by the late 1940s, British colonial authorities were debating the overall ecological efficiency of the lake. For many authorities at this time, the lake needed a large and efficient predator to turn haplochromine fish stocks into something more economically valuable. The prime candidate was the Nile perch (Lates niloticus). Arguments in favour of introducing a predator were as follows:

1. Evidence from other African lakes suggested that the Nile perch could do well commercially, and if the fish were introduced into Lake Victoria, it would no doubt eat the haplochromines, and hence improve the overall value of the fishery. In addition, it was suggested that by introducing such a fish, fishers might turn their attentions to catching it, so easing some of the pressure on tilapia stocks. Because the Nile perch can weigh as much as 200 kilograms (440 lb), it was argued, fishers would be encouraged to use large mesh-sizes to capture it. Furthermore, the perch was said to prefer off-shore habitats, and this would serve to relieve pressure on the in-shore tilapia fishery.
2. In those lakes where the Nile perch was a native it co-existed with tilapia species, and therefore it posed no great danger to commercially important tilapia stocks in Lake Victoria.
3. The potential size of the perch made it a fine sports fish, and this might attract sports fishers and tourists to the lake region.
4. Finally, archaeological findings close to Lake Victoria suggested that an ancestor of the Nile perch had been native to the Miocene predecessor of Lake Victoria, Lake Karunga. It was reasoned, then, that if the perch had once been native to the lake, there was little reason why it could not be a native again.

The arguments against its introduction were as follows:

1. Predators can never be as abundant as non-predators because of their nutritional requirements. In other words, the amount of fish a Nile perch has to eat to produce a kilogram of flesh is far greater than the amount of vegetative matter a tilapia has to eat to produce an equal amount of flesh. In ecological terms, the Nile perch is inefficient. As mentioned above, the fertility of tropical waters depends on the rate at which nutrients (mainly detritus) are brought back into solution. The Nile perch, however, does not eat this detritus, and it was argued that its introduction would do little to improve the over-all ecological efficiency of the lake. If any fish should be introduced, it should be a herbivore or a detritivore.
2. It would be wishful thinking to suppose that the Nile perch would exclusively consume haplochromines.
3. Given the complexity of tropical ecosystems, it is impossible to predict what might happen should the Nile perch be introduced.

While the argument continued, it was agreed that tilapia stocks needed bolstering largely as a result of increasing fishing pressure on indigenous species, associated with the expansion of the market for fresh fish in the 1940s. Tilapia introductions started in the early 1950s with Oreochromis leucostictus from Entebbe, and followed by Tilapia zillii (Winam Gulf, 1953), T. rendalli (Winam Gulf 1953–54), O. niloticus (Kagera River 1954) and O. mossambicus (Entebbe 1961–62). Because tilapia are detritivores and herbivores, these introductions were regarded as less threatening than the introduction of any carnivore. Nevertheless, while the argument over the introduction of the Nile perch raged throughout the early 1960s, it seems that it had already been surreptitiously introduced in 1954 from Uganda. Once it had been discovered to be in the lake, further official introductions occurred in 1962 and 1963.

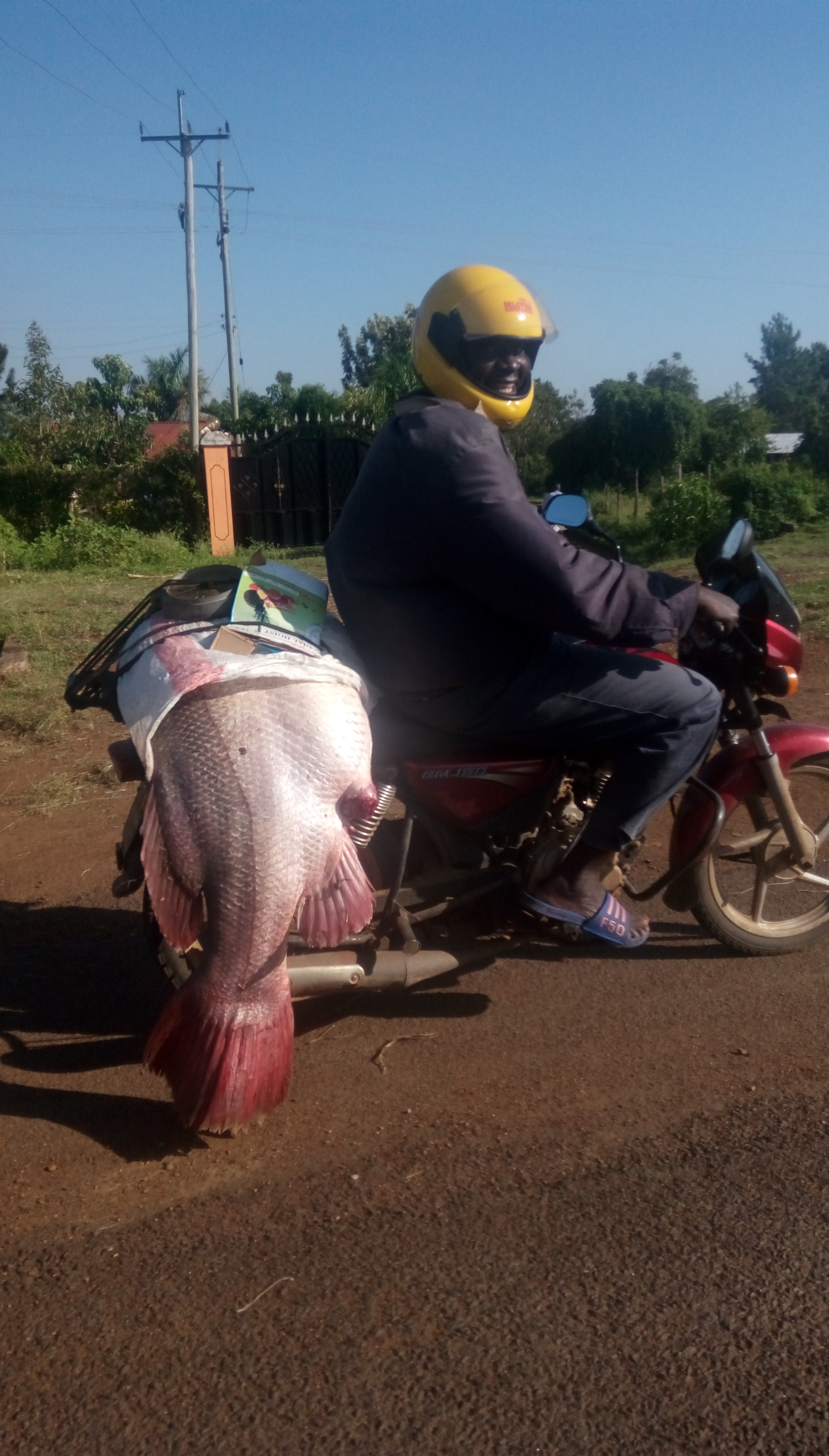
Ugandan with tilapia on a scooter

Introduced tilapia species were unable to establish themselves in the lake between the 1950s and 1963. Following unusually heavy rainfall in the early 1960s, however (the so-called 'Uhuru Rains'), the lake-level rose considerably, flooding large areas of shore-line, and opening up new breeding areas to fledgling tilapia stocks, so creating the opportunities for these exotic species to compete with indigenous stocks. Of the six exotic species introduced, two – Oreochromis niloticus and O. zillii – were to firmly establish themselves in the lake, so that by the early 1980s, these two species comprised the mainstay of tilapia catches. Of the indigenous species, O. esculentus was extirpated from the lake as a consequence of competition with introduced tilapiids, while O. variabilis populations declined significantly.

The Nile perch is a substantial predator. One specimen, preserved at the Kisumu Museum in Kenya, weighed 184 kg (406 lb) when landed. Populations of the fish established themselves in a clockwise motion around the lake, starting in Uganda, followed by Kenya and ending in Tanzania. Initial catches were minimal, but grew rapidly in the 1980s, heralding the start of the so-called 'Nile perch boom'. "On the face of it...the lake after the debut of Lates [Nile perch] has turned into a fish producer that can only be described in Gargantuan terms".

The introduction of the Nile perch had a decisive impact on haplochromine stocks which it favoured as its prey, affecting both their abundance and diversity. It is believed that the contribution of this species flock to the fish biomass of the lake has decreased from 80% to less than 1% since the introduction of the Nile perch, and that some 40% of the haplochromine species were driven to extinction in the process. This may well represent the largest extinction event amongst vertebrates in the 20th century and has been called the "most dramatic example of human-caused extinctions within an ecosystem".

Freed from their evolutionary predators, populations of the diminutive endemic silver cyprinid Rastrineobola argentea (omena in Luo, mukene in Ganda and dagaa in Swahili), flourished, developing into huge shoals. In turn, pied kingfisher (Ceryle rudis) populations, that had hitherto fed on haplochromines, exploded in response to this new food source. Similar and other impacts have propagated throughout the ecosystem.

Given its 'evolutionary plasticity', it follows that haplochromines should adapt rapidly to the new environmental conditions generated by the Nile perch 'boom' and eutrophic conditions. Evidence from studies on the lake does suggest that this is happening. One haplochromine, H. (Yssichromis) pyrrhocephalus, a zooplanktivore, was almost driven to extinction by the Nile perch. This species has recovered alongside increased exploitation of the Nile perch, at a time (the 1990s) when water clarity and dissolved oxygen levels had declined as a consequence of eutrophication. Over a period of just two decades, H. pyrrhocephalus responded to raised hypoxia (oxygen deficiency) by increasing its gill surface area by 64%. Head length, eye length, and head volume decreased in size, whereas cheek depth increased. The former morphological changes may have occurred to accommodate this increased gill size. Other morphological changes suggest adaptations in response to the availability of larger and tougher prey types.

By the end of the 1940s, fish stocks were under severe pressure. The market for fish grew since railways were available to carry fish to the coast and settlements in between. Improved fishing boats and nets were introduced. (Note: A full description of the development of fish markets surrounding the Kenyan part of the lake is provided by Geheb, 1997.) British colonial authorities set out to remedy this through the introduction of exotic species, including tilapia and the Nile perch. These introductions had five main impacts. The first of these was the rise of the Nile perch. The fish took some time to establish itself, and only began to appear in catch statistics in the mid-1970s. By the 1980s, the 'explosion' of this species was being referred to as the Nile perch 'boom'. Catches climbed from about 335 mt in 1975, to a peak of 380,776 mt in 1990. (Note: See Geheb et al. (2008) and catch statistics provided by the Lake Victoria Fisheries Organisation.) The second impact was the Nile perch's devastation of the haplochromine species flock, its main food source. Catches of this species crashed. The third impact related to the lake's diminutive endemic silver cyprinid, the dagaa. Freed from competition (with haplochromine species) for food sources, this species thrived. It was not the main target of the Nile perch, and catches increased spectacularly from 13,000 mt in 1975, to an all-time high 567,268 mt in 2006. The fourth main impact of the introductions related to the exotic tilapia species. One of these, the Nile tilapia (Oreochromis niloticus), was to establish itself firmly in the fishery. Tilapia catches from the lake rose from about 13,000 mt in 1975, to an all-time high of around 105,000 mt in 2000. There can be little doubt that these introductions saved the fishery from collapse. With such increases, so too the entire production system on the lake changed, the fifth and final key change. Prior to the arrival of the colonial administration, the fishery was dominated by fishermen (mainly, although certain fishing techniques were reserved for women) who owned their labour and their fishing gear. Contributing to the near-collapse of the fishery in the 1940s and 1950s was the reorganisation of the fishery into fleets drawing on hired labour and much improved gear. The Nile perch 'boom' was to accelerate and massively expand this process. It coincided with an emerging European market for high-quality white fish meat, prompting the development of industrial fish processing capacity along the lake's shores in Kisumu, Musoma, Mwanza, Entebbe and Jinja. The export of Nile perch has since expanded away from the European Union (EU) to the Middle East, the United States and Australia, and now represents large foreign exchange earnings to the lake's riparian states. In Uganda, indeed, its export is second only to coffee in the rankings of export earnings. In 2006, the total value of Nile perch exports from the lake was estimated to be US$250 million. The main market for the perch remains the EU, and the industry is, therefore, subject to the worries of EU health and safety inspectors. The EU has frequently closed its doors to the export for reasons ranging from unsatisfactory hygiene at factories to cholera outbreaks on the lake shores.

In 2007, Lake Victoria Sailing Company (LVSC) petitioned the Ugandan government to gazette the first Lacustrine Protected Area (LPA) in Ugandan Lake Victoria that is enforced by the UPDF-Fish Protection Unit (FPU). This protected area is to encourage fishers to form fishing cooperatives and allow fish populations to replenish.

In 2015, Victory Farms was founded by two Americans, and soon became the fastest growing fish farm in sub-Saharan Africa.

== Economic impact ==
With such high demands for Nile perch, the value of the fishery has risen considerably. Labour inflows into the fishery have increased along with growing demand. In 1983, there were an estimated 12,041 boats on the lake. By 2004, there were 51,712, and 153,066 fishermen. The fishery also generates indirect employment for additional multitudes of fish processors, transporters, factory employees and others. All along the lakeshore, 'boom towns' have developed in response to the demands of fishing crews with money to spend from a day's fishing. (Note: See for an anthropological study of these towns, called village landings, Beuving (2010).) These towns resemble shanties, and have little in the way of services. Of the 1,433 landing sites identified in the 2004 frame survey, just 20% had communal lavatory facilities, 4% were served by electricity and 6% were served by a potable water supply.

The impact of perch fishing on the local economy is the subject of the 2004 documentary Darwin's Nightmare.

== Controversy ==
The Nile perch fishery has proved controversial, not least between conservationists keen to see the preservation of the lake's unique ecology; and others who recognise the fish's importance to regional economies and poverty alleviation. In the 1990s, one group of thinkers argued that the export of this fish represented a net loss of fish proteins to riparian fishing communities, hence explaining high incidences of malnutrition amongst them. 'Empirical evidence ... vividly show that the growing export of the Nile perch and the commercialisation of the dagaa are undermining the survival of households'. Malnutrition amongst these communities are indeed high; one study estimates that 40.2% of children in fishing communities are stunted. Rates of childhood malnutrition are, however, lower around the lake than they were in the agricultural hinterland. At fish landing sites, 5.7% of mothers were found to be chronically malnourished.

The three countries bordering Lake Victoria – Uganda, Kenya and Tanzania – have agreed in principle to the idea of a tax on Nile perch exports, proceeds to be applied to various measures to benefit local communities and sustain the fishery. However, this tax has not been put into force, enforcement of fisheries and environmental laws generally are lax, and the Nile perch fishery remains in essence a mining operation so far.
