= Lake Nabugabo =

Lake in Uganda

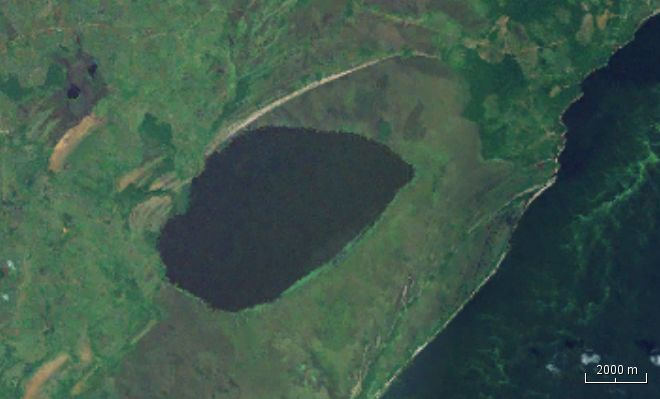

- Location within Uganda
- Location: Masaka District
- Coordinates: 00°22′12″S 31°54′00″E
- Basin countries: Uganda
- Max. length: 8.2 km (5.1 mi)
- Max. width: 5 km (3.1 mi)
- Surface area: 22,000 ha (54,000 acres)
- Surface elevation: 1,180 m (3,870 ft)
- Settlements: Masaka, Uganda

Ramsar Wetland
- Official name: Lake Nabugabo wetland system
- Designated: 11 February 2004
- Reference no.: 1373

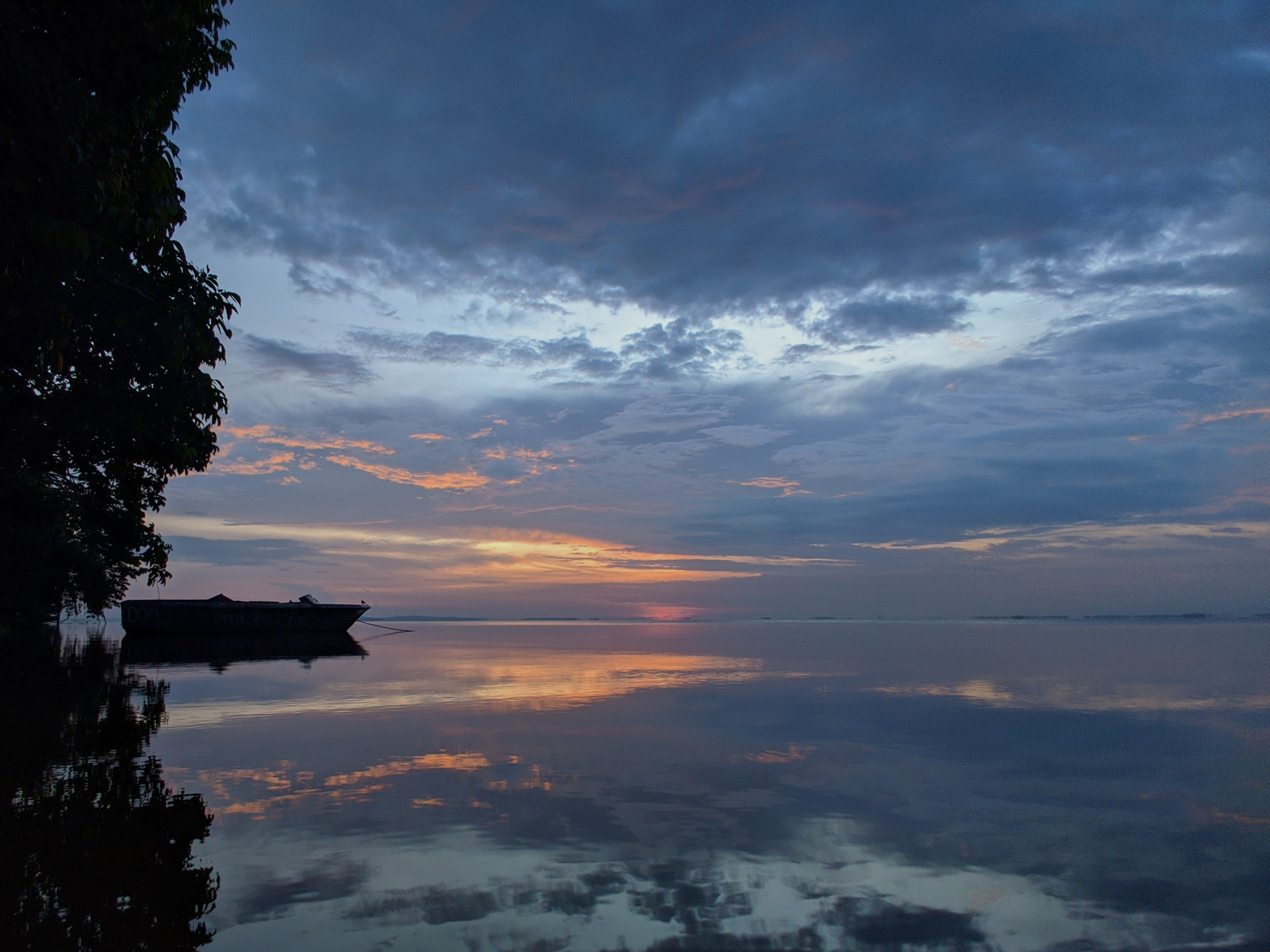
Mirror-like water during Lake Nabugabo sunrise

Lake Nabugabo is a small freshwater lake in Uganda.

== Location ==
The lake is in Masaka District, Central Region of Uganda, approximately 23 kilometres (14 mi), by road, east of the town of Masaka.

== Overview ==
Lake Nabugabo is a satellite lake of Lake Victoria, being only 4 kilometres (2.5 mi) away from its shores.

The area was chosen as a Ramsar Site (protected area) for its importance for the people and animals.

High human population densities and a reliance on subsistence agriculture are reflected in the heavy dependency of the neighboring community on the lake ecosystem. The poor agricultural practices have impacts on the water quality and food production.

== History ==
Lake Nabugabo was formed as a result of sand dunes resulting from strong winds. This lake is separated from Lake Victoria by a sand bar. An analysis of a 2.7-metre-long (8.9 ft) sediment core collected near the center of the lake showed that Lake Nabugabo was isolated from Lake Victoria about 5,000 years ago.

== Flora and fauna ==
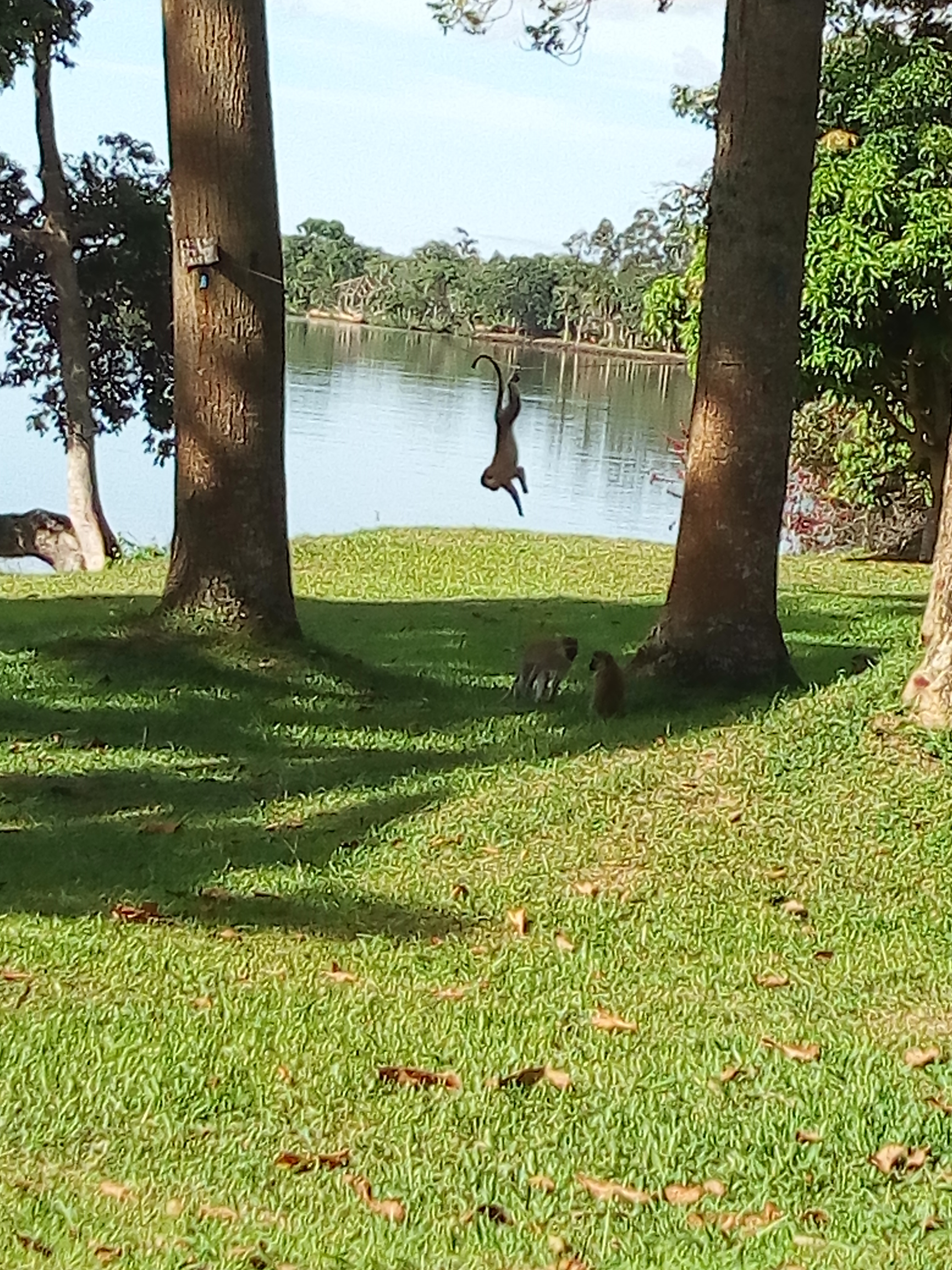

Almost 300 plant species have been recorded. The catchment area is home to two endemic flowering plants not found elsewhere, and fourteen species in Uganda are known only in this area. The most striking character of the rare Nabugabo plants is the relative dominance of carnivorous plants.

The fauna ecosystem consists of a wide variety of key animal communities. Hippopotamus and sitatunga are found. Among the birds, kingfishers and grey crowned crane are also found. Lake Nabugabo is an important stop-over point for a number of species of migratory birds.

=== Fish ===
The Nabugabo lake system, which includes the main lake itself and the associated lakes Kayanja, Kayugi and Manywa (all separated from Lake Nabugabo by swamps), is rich in native fish, notably eight species of haplochromine cichlids: the endemic Haplochromis annectidens, H. beadlei, H. simpsoni, H. velifer and H. venator, while H. nubilus, Astatoreochromis alluaudi and Pseudocrenilabrus multicolor also are found in other lakes of the Great Lakes region. As in Lake Victoria, the highly predatory Nile perch has been introduced to Nabugabo. However, while many of Lake Victoria's endemic haplochromines have become extinct, the endemic haplochromines of the Nabugabo lake system all survive, but they are considered threatened. Especially H. annectidens and H. venator have become rare, with the latter appearing to have disappeared from Lake Nabugabo itself, although it does survive in at least lakes Kayanja and Kayugi. Nile perch has not been introduced to lakes Kayanja, Kayugi and Manywa, and they are important for the survival of the rare haplochromines. They also support populations of the threatened Singida tilapia, which has disappeared from Nabugabo and several other lakes in the Great Lakes region. Two other species of the Great Lakes region, the widespread Bagrus docmak and the threatened Victoria tilapia, were formerly present in Lake Nabugabo and historically supported important fisheries. They appear to have disappeared from Lake Nabugabo and are not known to be present elsewhere in the Nabugabo lake system. A handful of other fish are native to Lake Nabugabo and still live there, including marbled lungfish, Mastacembelus frenatus, Enteromius barbs, Sadler's robber tetra, silver butter catfish, Fischer's Victoria squeaker, longnose stonebasher, Victoria stonebasher and Petrocephalus catostoma. In addition to the Nile perch, the blue-spotted tilapia, Nile tilapia, redbreast tilapia and redbelly tilapia have been introduced.
