= Michael Graham (scientist) =

British fisheries scientist (b. 1898, d. 1972)

Michael Graham CMG OBE
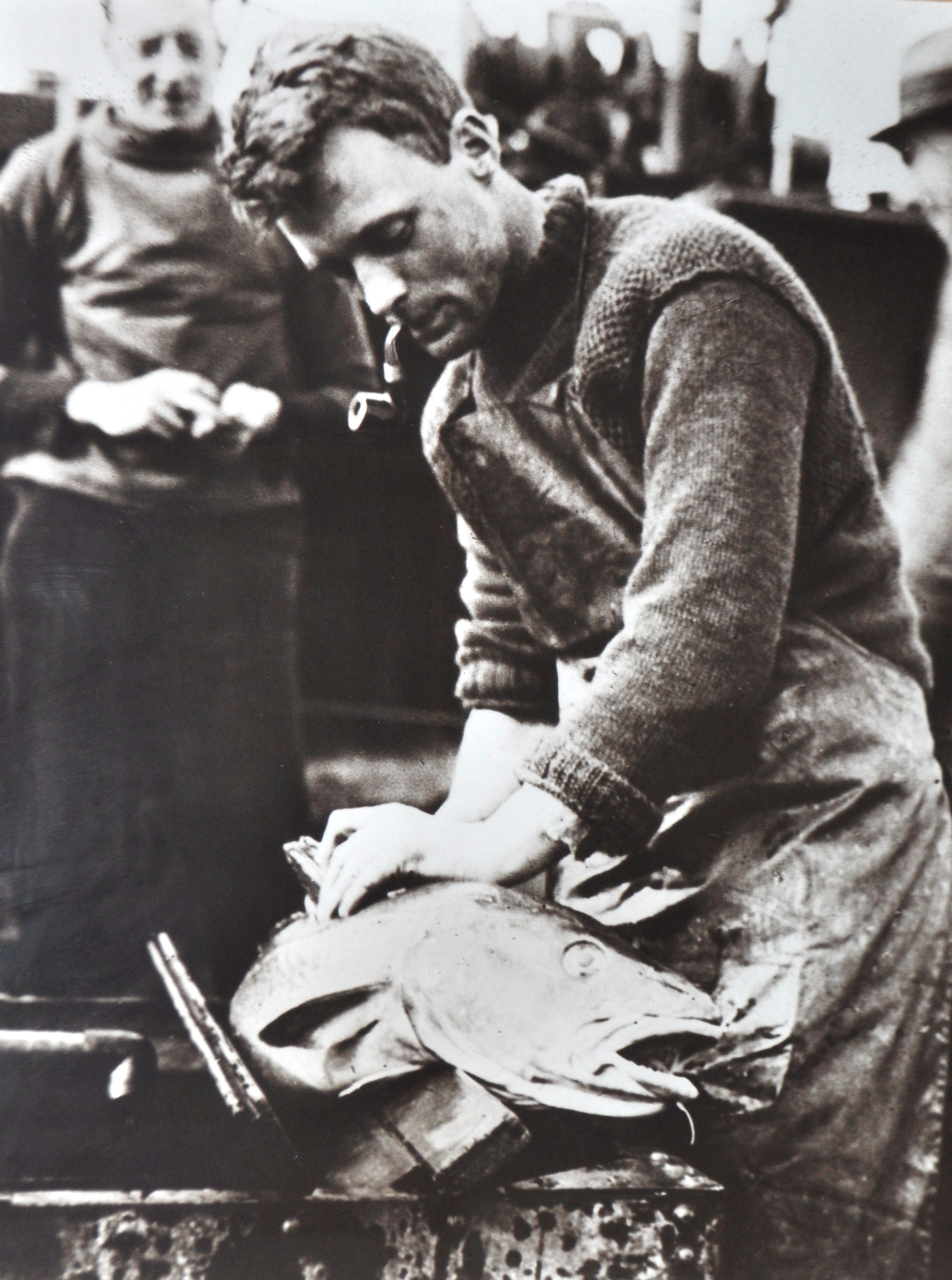
- Born: 22 February 1898; Manchester, England
- Died: 1 January 1972
- Citizenship: British
- Education: King's College, Cambridge
- Known for: His classic book, "The Fish Gate", published in 1943
- Spouse: Edith Meek
- Scientific career
- Fields: Fisheries Research; Agriculture; Ecology; Land Reclamation
- Workplaces: King's College, Cambridge; Ministry of Agriculture, Fisheries and Food (United Kingdom); Salford University

Michael Graham (1898–1972) CMG OBE was a British fisheries scientist, author, and ecologist. He was the director of the Ministry of Agriculture, Fisheries and Food (United Kingdom) fisheries laboratory in Lowestoft (1945–1958), now known as the Centre for Environment, Fisheries and Aquaculture Science (Cefas). His classic book, The Fish Gate, published in 1943, paints a picture of the near-collapse of the British fishing industry through overfishing that occurred before both the First and the Second World Wars.

== Biography ==
Godfrey Michael Graham was born in Manchester on 22 February 1898, the son of the Quaker writer John William Graham (1859–1932) and Margaret Brockbank. As a boy he loved the Lake District and the wildlife he encountered on his relation's Cumberland farm. His outstanding interest at Bootham School in York was in natural history. During World War I he served in the Royal Navy and afterwards read Natural Science at King's College, Cambridge. His professional career was spent as a scientific civil servant on the staff of the Fisheries Laboratory in Lowestoft. Here he could combine biological science with his experience and love of the sea, knowing that his research would be both practical and useful. In 1927-28 Michael Graham was dispatched by the fisheries laboratory and spent a year surveying fish populations in Lake Victoria. This survey represented the first ever systematic survey of one of Africa's great lakes and provides a unique baseline against which all subsequent changes can be compared.

Graham married Edith Meek in 1925, who had assisted Ministry staff in their investigation of pollution problems in the River Tyne and who was a daughter of Alexander Meek, one of the founders of the Dove Marine Laboratory, Cullercoats. He designed his own home in Lowestoft, acquiring enough land on which to keep cattle and horses and so in a small way to indulge his lifelong interest in farming. He always had a touch of eccentricity, as witnessed by his habit of writing with quills fashioned from the feathers of his own geese, wearing a flowing cape with a specially made inside pocket big enough for a ministry file and riding his Arab horse around Lowestoft at night with rear-lights fitted to his riding hat and stirrups.

In Lowestoft, Graham's work led him to be particularly concerned with the problem of overfishing. He was appointed Principal Naturalist in 1944 and Director of Fishery Investigations in 1945. He published several highly influential and thought-provoking books during this time, most notably The Fish Gate in 1943, Human Needs in 1951 and Sea Fisheries: Their Investigation in the United Kingdom in 1956. As Director of Fisheries to HM Government he was made CMG (Companion of the Order of St Michael and St George) in January 1954, he was also responsible for recruiting Ray Beverton and Sidney Holt whose treatise On the Dynamics of Exploited Fish Populations (1957) is dedicated to Graham and is widely regarded as the cornerstone of modern fisheries science.

During the Second World War, Michael Graham was engaged on operational research in the RAF, for which he was awarded the OBE (Order of the British Empire). He retired in 1958 to devote himself to reclaiming derelict land in south Lancashire, and successfully demonstrated a practical and economic way of 'greening over' post-industrial slag heaps. From 1966 to 1971 he was a visiting Lecturer in the Department of Biology at Salford University, and to his great joy the department adopted and continued his work of land reclamation. Michael Graham did not live to see his last book A Natural Ecology (1973) published; he died on New Year's Day 1972 at the age of 72.

== Fisheries Survey of Lake Victoria ==
Lake Victoria has witnessed many dramatic changes over the past Century as a result of the introduction of Nile Perch, eutrophication and climatic change. These influences have in-turn resulted in major alteration to indigenous fish communities. In 1927 Michael Graham was sent from the fisheries laboratory in Lowestoft to spend a year surveying fish populations and fisheries in Lake Nyanza (Lake Victoria) on behalf of the Colonial Office. This unique survey represents the first ever characterisation of Lake Victoria fish communities.

The original hand-written 'Naturalists Logbooks' from this survey have recently been re-discovered in the archive of the Centre for Environment, Fisheries and Aquaculture Science (Cefas), these are now being digitized and made available to researchers seeking a 'baseline' against which subsequent changes can be compared.

During his survey of Lake Victoria, Michael Graham recorded fifty-eight species of Haplochromis including many new species, and commented that "the number of individuals is almost incredible!". While Graham regretted that the enormous haplochromine population was not really 'useful', he warned against introduction of a large predator that could convert these little, bony fish – which the colonial fisheries officers called trash fish – into large fish that could be caught for food. The leading candidate at that time was the Nile perch, which was tasty, grew to over six feet (about 2 metres) and two hundred pounds (a hundred kilograms), and already lived in nearby Lake Albert. At the time Graham wrote "The introduction of a large predatory species from another area would be attended with the upmost danger, unless preceded by extensive research into the probable effects of this operation". In a footnote he added that his warning had just been strengthened by a recent research report from Lake Albert, which described how rare the tilapia had become.

Survey catches included several Haplochromis species that are now thought to be extinct, including: Haplochromis flavipinnis, Haplochromis gowersii, Haplochromis longirostris, Haplochromis macrognathus, Haplochromis michaeli, Haplochromis nigrescens, Haplochromis prognathus. The specific name Haplochromis michaeli honours Michael Graham as the collector of the type specimen.

On 13 December 1928, Certificates of recommendation were received by the Linnean Society for election of Michael Graham to Fellowship status. Michael Graham read his paper on "The Natural History of the Victoria Nyanza", at the Linnean Society on 24 May 1929.

== The Fish Gate and Graham's "Great Law of Fishing" ==
Michael Graham's given task on joining the Lowestoft laboratory was to study the North Sea cod fishery. He continued, with breaks for field studies in Africa and Canada, throughout the 1920s and 1930s, describing the cod's life cycle and spawning grounds, and showing the age composition of the fishery through a laborious process of scale-reading. In a 1935 paper Graham conclusively showed that the North Sea stock was overfished. His classic book, The Fish Gate reminds us that by 1939 the North Sea was exhausted and many fishermen were unemployed – the inevitable result of unrestrained over-fishing.

The problem, according to Michael Graham, was that as soon as fishermen began fishing, stocks started to decline. To compensate, fishermen bought bigger nets and engines, but after a certain point, profits would slide. Graham thought the solution was to regulate fishing so that only larger, older fish could be caught. Graham distilled the observations of 20 years at sea into his Great Law of Fishing, a simple declarative statement such that "Fisheries that are unlimited become unprofitable". Graham said this was a law demonstrable by experience, not scientific theory (although this was later proven mathematically by Beverton and Holt). As long as the effort is free and urged on by competition, fisheries will eventually fail. The Great Law, he pointed out, was only fruitful in its inverse form "that limiting effort will restore profit to a fishery". While some thought that fishermen needed to conserve stocks so their sons could fish, Graham believed fishermen had to change the way they fished so they themselves could continue to make a living.

In trying to explain why the North Sea and other seas declined and their fishing ports collapsed, Graham is a seminal figure, both for his influence on the 'golden age' of fisheries science and for his advocacy of 'rational' fishing and the conservation of biological systems on which humans depend for food.

The Fish Gate is notable for citing Das Kapital by Karl Marx in the context of the growing industrialisation of the fishing industry.

== The Michael Graham Prizes ==
The MAFF – Directorate of Fisheries (now Cefas) has been an affiliated institute of the University of East Anglia (UEA) since 1965. In 1974, staff at the Lowestoft laboratory created an endowment called The Michael Graham Prize, funded through royalties received from sale of the book Sea Fisheries Research. This book had been written by members of the laboratory as a tribute to their esteemed former Director who had died in 1972.

Three prizes of £100 each, now collectively known as the Michael Graham Prizes, are awarded annually to students in the Faculty of Science at the University of East Anglia, one for best performance in the Ecology degree, one for best performance in the MSc in Applied Ecology and Conservation and one for the best conservation project by an undergraduate student from either ENV (School of Environmental Sciences) or BIO (School of Biological Sciences).
