= Agu Swamp =

Agu Swamp as seen from satellite. Lake Agu can be seen in the middle.

Agu Swamp is a swamp located along the border of Ngora District and Serere District in Teso sub-region, Uganda. A small lake, Lake Agu, is located within the swamp.

== Description ==
Agu Swamp is located at 1°28′44″N 33°41′6″E, and is part of the Lake Kyoga drainage basin. Agu Bridge on the Serere-Ngora Road crosses over it. The swamp is near Abuket where people take cattle in January due to the intensity of the dry season at this time in Teso.

Agu is one of the largest permanent swamps in Teso. It has water throughout the year. Most of the vegetation around Lake Agu is species of Echinochloa (including Echinochloa pyramidalis), with papyrus, bladderworts, Nymphaea caerulea, and Typha latifolia also being present. Over 30 species of fish have been found in the lake, including redbelly tilapia, longnose stonebashers, and Fischer's Victoria squeaker. Various species of amphibians, including African reed frogs and the Mascarene grass frog, are also found in the lake. A breeding colony of Marabou storks was first reported to live in the swamp in January 1914, and were seen again in the 1970s.

It helps in filtering water and controls floods.

People from Ngora and Serere get fish like mud fish and tilapia. During dry season, it is the main for grazing animals. Agu bridge connects Serere District to Ngora District. It supplies water to people.

== Problems facing Agu ==
The swamp is being destroyed by human activities like growing rice inside it, burning charcoal and over grazing. The government of Uganda has asked people to voluntarily stop farming on the wetland in order to protect it. In 2021, the Ministry of Water and Environment set up a demonstration farm on six acres of land outside of the swamp, in order to provide an alternative for local farmers who previously used the wetland.

In 2024, leaders complained about Banyankole herdsmen bringing more than 2000 heads of cattle into the swamp in just two weeks. This brings many diseases like foot rot, foot and mouth disease and also destroys the environment. Agu swamp is a source of water, food, and life for Teso.
