= SS Kavirondo =

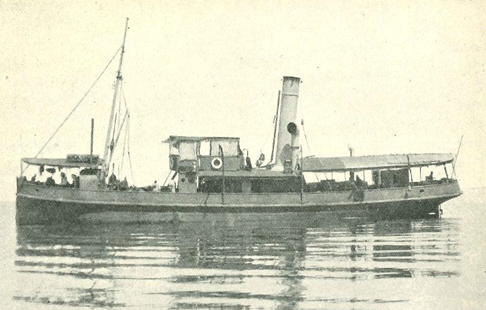

History
- Name: SS Kavirondo
- Namesake: Kavirondo Region
- Owner: Uganda Railway
- Operator: Uganda Railway
- Port of registry: (East Africa Protectorate) Kisumu, Kenya
- Builder: Bow, McLachlan & Co Paisley, Scotland
- Launched: 1913

General characteristics
- Type: Steam tug
- Tonnage: 228 GRT
- Length: 100ft
- Beam: 21ft

SS Kavirondo was a steam tug on Lake Victoria in East Africa. She was named after a local Lake Victoria region and was one of many compact Lake Victoria steamships operated by the Uganda Railway.

Bow, McLachlan and Company of Paisley in Renfrewshire, Scotland built her as a "knock down" vessel; that is, she was bolted together in the shipyard at Paisley, all the parts marked with numbers, disassembled into many hundreds of parts and transported in kit form by sea to Mombasa, Kenya. The kit was shipped by railway to Kisumu on the shore of Lake Victoria for reassembly and launch in 1913.

In the First World War Kavirondo was armed as a gunboat. In 1921 she was still recorded as a functioning vessel based in Kisumu - her telegraph address was recorded as 'Kavirontug'.

Between 22 August 1927 and 19 February 1928 the SS Kavirondo was chartered by Michael Graham on behalf of the British Colonial Office in order to conduct the first ever Fisheries Survey of Lake Victoria. During this time the vessel was used to deploy a wide diversity of fishing gears and to provide transportation for the scientists.

In about 1984, she was laid up at Kisumu and later was used as an accommodation vessel. She later sank alongside, but in 2005 was raised. Her purchasers intended to lengthen and re-engine her for use as a tanker.
