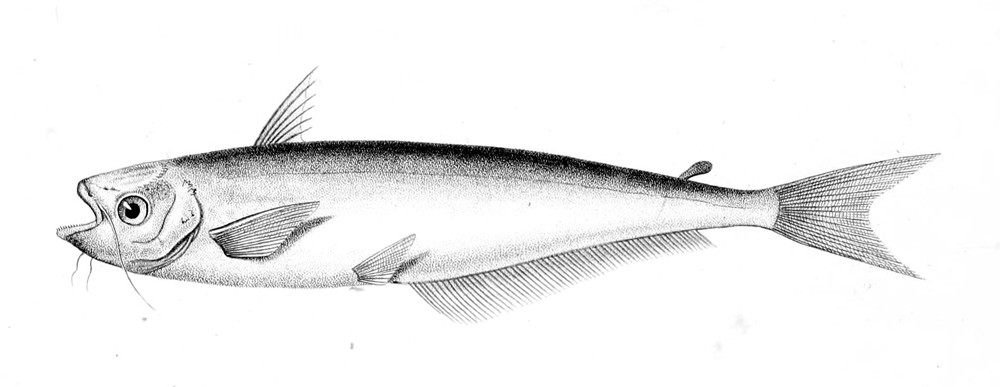
- Schilbe mystus

Scientific classification
- Kingdom: Animalia
- Phylum: Chordata
- Class: Actinopterygii
- Order: Siluriformes
- Family: Schilbeidae
- Genus: Schilbe; Oken, 1817

Type species
- Silurus mystus Linnaeus, 1758

Species
- See text

= Schilbe =

Genus of fishes

Schilbe is a genus of schilbid catfishes native to Africa. Some are colloquially called butter catfish, though this may also refer to the Asian genus Ompok of the family Siluridae.

== Species ==
There are currently 23 recognized species in this genus:

- Schilbe angolensis (De Vos, 1984)
- Schilbe ansorgii (Boulenger, 1910)
- Schilbe banguelensis (Boulenger, 1911) (Golden Barbel)
- Schilbe bocagii (Guimarães, 1884)
- Schilbe brevianalis (Pellegrin, 1929)
- Schilbe congensis (Leach, 1818)
- Schilbe depressirostris (Peters, 1852)
- Schilbe djeremi (Thys van den Audenaerde & De Vos, 1982)
- Schilbe durinii (Gianferrari, 1932)
- Schilbe grenfelli (Boulenger, 1900)
- Schilbe intermedius Rüppell, 1832 (Silver Butter Catfish)
- Schilbe laticeps (Boulenger, 1899)
- Schilbe mandibularis (Günther, 1867)
- Schilbe marmoratus Boulenger, 1911 (Shoulderspot Catfish)
- Schilbe micropogon (Trewavas, 1943)
- Schilbe moebiusii (Pfeffer, 1896)
- Schilbe multitaeniatus (Pellegrin, 1913)
- Schilbe mystus (Linnaeus, 1758) (African Butter Catfish)
- Schilbe nyongensis (De Vos, 1981)
- Schilbe tumbanus (Pellegrin, 1926)
- Schilbe uranoscopus Rüppell, 1832
- Schilbe yangambianus (Poll, 1954) (Yangambi Butterbarbel)
- Schilbe zairensis De Vos, 1995
