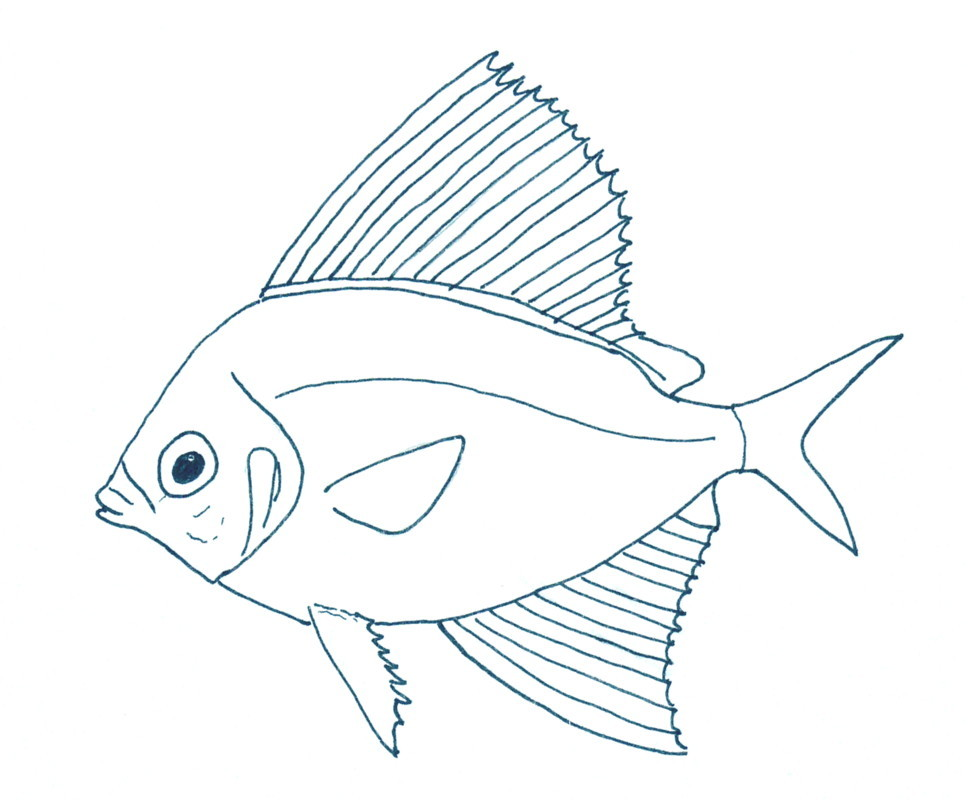

Conservation status
- Vulnerable (IUCN 2.3)

Scientific classification
- Kingdom: Animalia
- Phylum: Chordata
- Class: Actinopterygii
- Division: Teleostei
- Order: Cichliformes
- Family: Cichlidae
- Genus: Haplochromis
- Species: H. velifer

Binomial name
- Haplochromis velifer Trewavas, 1933

Synonyms
- Astatotilapia velifer (Trewavas, 1933)

= Haplochromis velifer =

Species of fish

Haplochromis velifer is a species of cichlid endemic to Lake Nabugabo, Uganda. This species reaches a length of 10.8 centimetres (4.3 in) SL.
