= Haplochromis venator =

Conservation status
- Endangered (IUCN 2.3)

Scientific classification
- Kingdom: Animalia
- Phylum: Chordata
- Class: Actinopterygii
- Order: Cichliformes
- Family: Cichlidae
- Genus: Haplochromis
- Species: H. venator

Binomial name
- Haplochromis venator Greenwood, 1965

Synonyms
- Prognathochromis venator (Greenwood, 1965)

Species of fish

Haplochromis venator is a species of cichlid endemic to Lake Nabugabo in Uganda. This species reaches a length of 17.8 centimetres (7.0 in) SL.
