= Schilbe moebiusii =

Conservation status
- Least Concern (IUCN 3.1)

Scientific classification
- Kingdom: Animalia
- Phylum: Chordata
- Class: Actinopterygii
- Order: Siluriformes
- Family: Schilbeidae
- Genus: Schilbe
- Species: S. moebiusii

Binomial name
- Schilbe moebiusii (Pfeffer, 1896)

Species of fish

Schilbe moebiusii is a species of schilbid catfish endemic to Tanzania where it occurs in the Ruaha, Kingani and Kilombero Rivers. This species grows to a length of 27.3 centimetres (10.7 in) TL.

== Sources ==
- Froese, Rainer; Pauly, Daniel (eds.). "Schilbe moebiusii". FishBase. February 2012 version.
