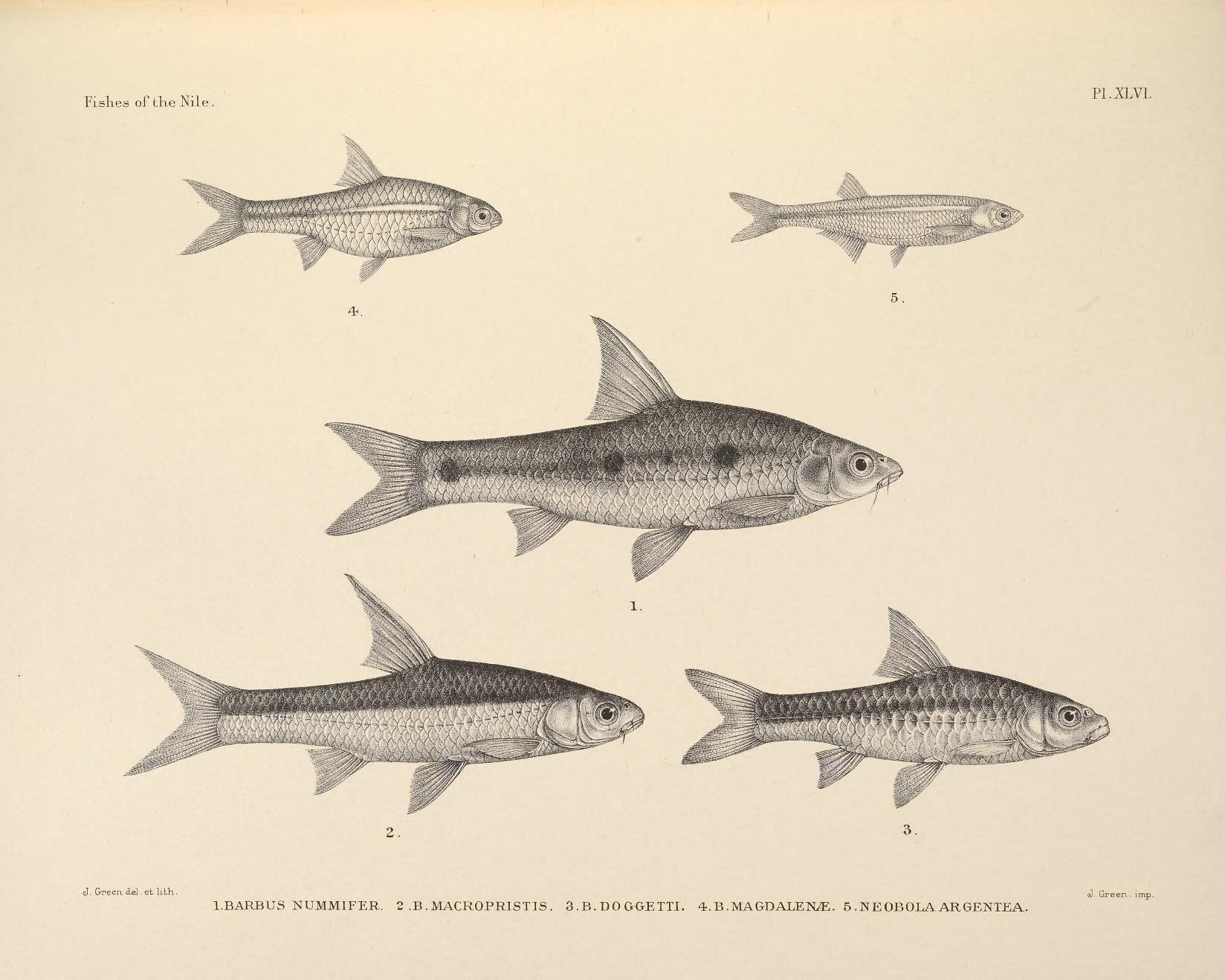
- See number 5 at upper right

Conservation status
- Least Concern (IUCN 3.1)

Scientific classification
- Kingdom: Animalia
- Phylum: Chordata
- Class: Actinopterygii
- Order: Cypriniformes
- Family: Danionidae
- Genus: Rastrineobola
- Species: R. argentea

Binomial name
- Rastrineobola argentea (Pellegrin, 1904)

Synonyms
- Neobola argentea Pellegrin, 1904; Engraulicypris argenteus (Pellegrin, 1904)

= Silver cyprinid =

Species of fish

The silver cyprinid (Rastrineobola argentea) also known as the Lake Victoria sardine, mukene, and omena (Dholuo), dagaa ( Kiswahili) is a species of pelagic, freshwater ray-finned fish in the danio family, Danionidae from East Africa. It is the only member of the genus Rastrineobola.

== Description ==
A small silvery fish which has a strongly compressed body covered in large scales with a pearlescent sheen and a yellow tail, and can grow to a length of 9 cm (3.5 in). The lateral line is below the midpoint of the body and runs to the lower part of the caudal peduncle. The cheek is covered by delicate suborbital bones.

== Distribution ==
The silver cyprinid is known from the drainage basins of Lake Kyoga, Lake Nabugabo and the Victoria Nile that are located in Uganda, and Lake Victoria that is shared by Kenya, Uganda and Tanzania.

== Biology ==
The silver cyprinid has a lake-wide distribution covering both inshore and offshore in Lake Victoria. It normally occurs between 0 and 20 m (0–66 ft) in depth, although both eggs and fry can be encountered as deep as 68 m (223 ft). The adult fish stay close to the bottom in daytime and rise up towards the surface at night. The juvenile fish move away from the shore where they spend their larval stage in shallow water. In Lake Kyoga this species is found in open water apparently avoiding the water-lily swamps and it is normally caught in turbulent areas of the Victoria Nile. Its diet consists mainly of zooplankton and insects caught on the water surface. It is predated on by birds and the catfish Schilbe mystus, Clarias gariepinus and Bagrus docmak. It is thought that spawning occurs inshore and a mature female may have an estimated fecundity of >1,000 eggs. The eggs are planktonic. The silver cyprinid breeds throughout the year with two peaks, the first in August and the second in December-January. It is fast growing and reaches sexual maturity at ages which vary from 16 to 25 months.

The silver cyprinid is parasitized by the fish cestode Ligula intestinalis and this parasite causes changes in the adult fishes' behaviour in that they remain with the juveniles on the surface and undertake horizontal movements to and from the shores. In the mid-morning the parasitised fish have a tendency to move towards the shoreline, especially where there are sandy beaches, to search for food. The juveniles feed on zooplankton such as copepods and young stages of planktonic chironomids while the parasitised adults prefer insect larvae and shore dwelling adult insects such as corixid bugs. After nightfall the surface dwelling parasitised fish mix with the healthy adults when they move up the water column to top waters of the lake.

The silver cyprinid is the only native fish species which has remained abundant in Lake Victoria since the introduction of the Nile perch, Lates niloticus and Nile tilapia Oreochromis niloticus to the lake. These two species have almost wiped out the native zooplankton-eating haplochromine cichlids thus reducing competition for this species.

== Fishery ==
Global capture production of Silver cyprinid (Rastrineobola argentea) in thousand tonnes from 1976 to 2022, as reported by the FAO

Dagaa/mukene/omena is an important fish for Lake Victoria fishermen. It is caught using light attraction during moonless nights.

== Food ==
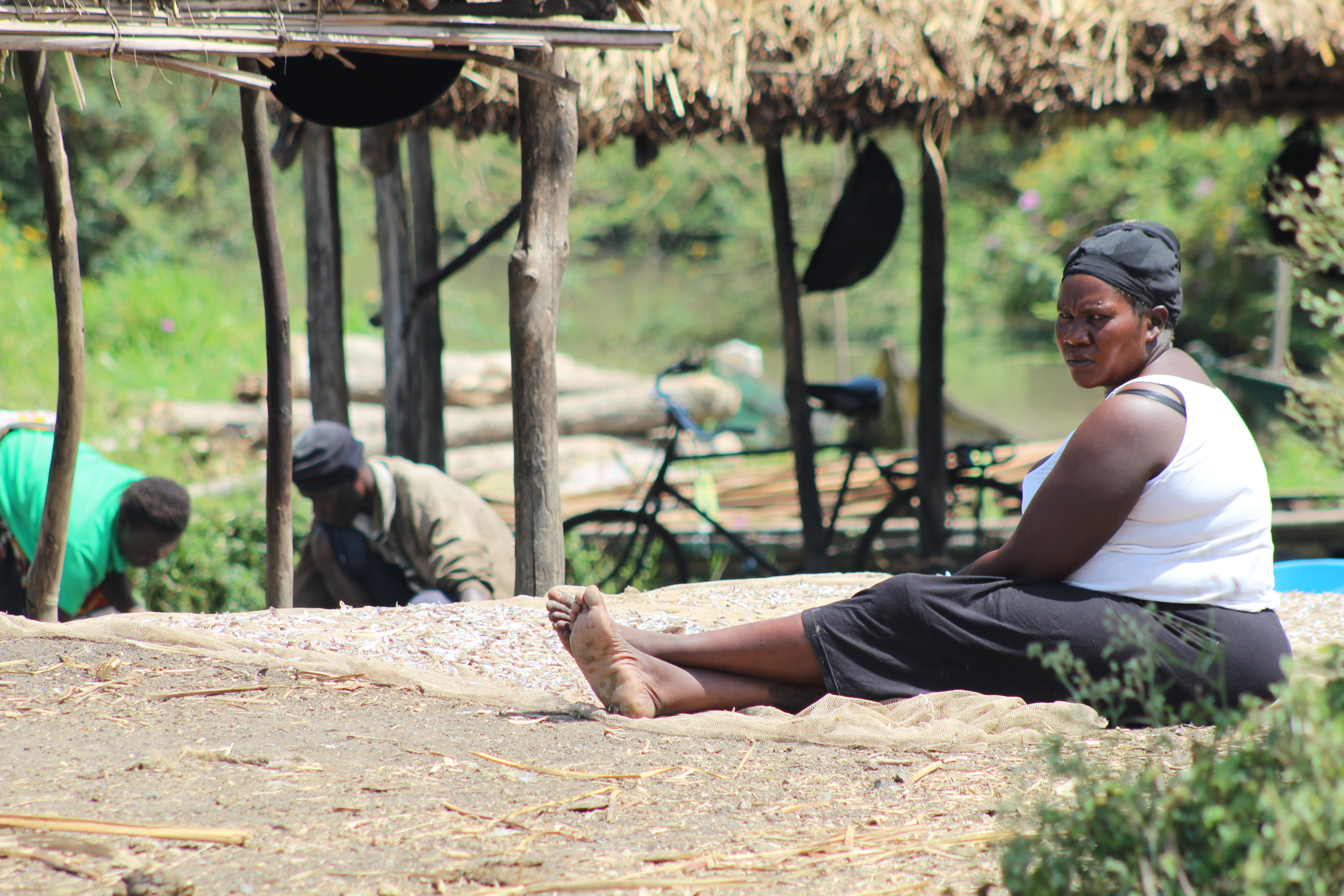
Woman selling omena at the shores of a river in Kano Kisumu

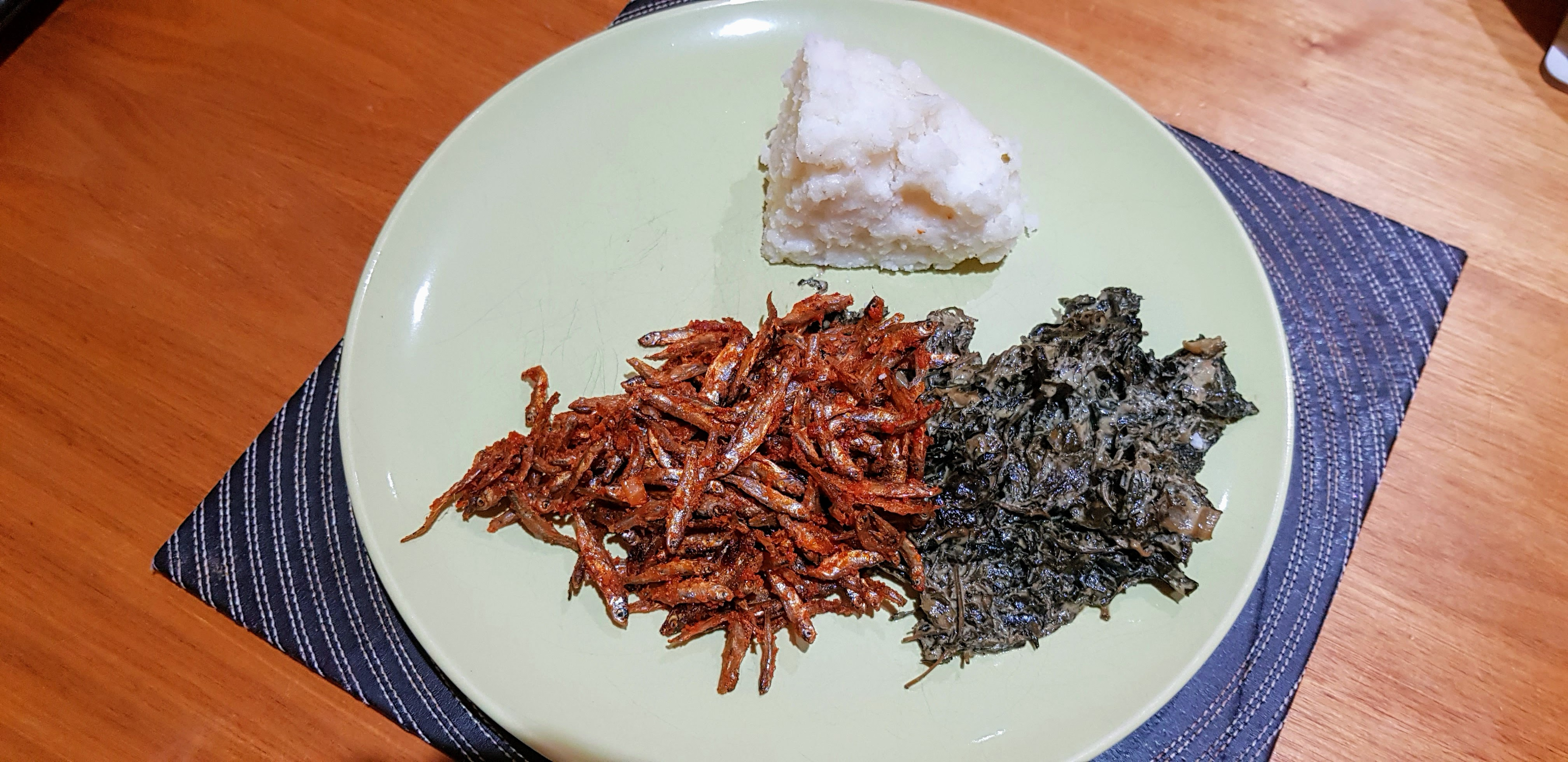
Meal of Omena, Veg and Ugali

Dagaa/mukene/omena from Lake Victoria is an important fish in the diet of people in eastern and southern Africa. The fish is caught during moonless nights and in the morning it is sold to women who spread it out for drying in the sun. This takes one day or more, depending on the weather. Unfortunately, the best catches are made during the rainy season when drying is difficult resulting in lower quality of the dried product. The lowest quality is however still usable as chicken feed. Drying is often done on the sand, on rocks or on old nets spread on the grass. Drying racks have not caught on, neither have salting or smoking. The dried fish is packed in sacks and traders take the fish to the market. A major wholesale market for dried dagaa is in Mwanza, Tanzania, and Kisumu Kenya, from where it is transported all over eastern and southern Africa for use as food or chicken feed. Sometimes it competes with dried kapenta which is usually preferred though more expensive.
