= Haplochromis annectidens =

Conservation status
- Critically Endangered (IUCN 2.3)

Scientific classification
- Kingdom: Animalia
- Phylum: Chordata
- Class: Actinopterygii
- Order: Cichliformes
- Family: Cichlidae
- Genus: Haplochromis
- Species: H. annectidens

Binomial name
- Haplochromis annectidens Trewavas, 1933

Species of fish

Haplochromis annectidens is a species of cichlid endemic to Lake Nabugabo in Uganda. This species reaches a length of 6.7 centimetres (2.6 in) SL.
