= Haplochromis simpsoni =

Conservation status
- Endangered (IUCN 2.3)

Scientific classification
- Kingdom: Animalia
- Phylum: Chordata
- Class: Actinopterygii
- Order: Cichliformes
- Family: Cichlidae
- Genus: Haplochromis
- Species: H. simpsoni

Binomial name
- Haplochromis simpsoni Greenwood, 1965

Synonyms
- Gaurochromis simpsoni (Greenwood, 1965)

Species of fish

Haplochromis simpsoni is a species of cichlid endemic to Lake Nabugabo in Uganda. This species reaches a length of 11.4 centimetres (4.5 in) SL.
