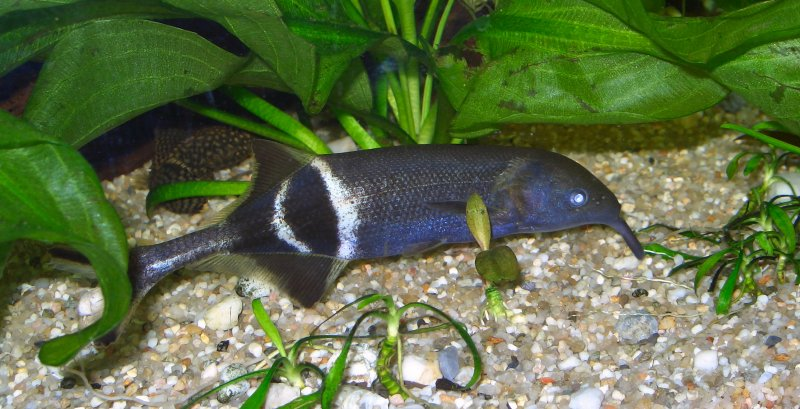
- Gnathonemus petersii

Scientific classification
- Kingdom: Animalia
- Phylum: Chordata
- Class: Actinopterygii
- Order: Osteoglossiformes
- Family: Mormyridae
- Genus: Gnathonemus; T. N. Gill, 1863

Type species
- Mormyrus petersii Günther, 1862

Species
- see text

= Gnathonemus =

Genus of ray-finned fishes

Gnathonemus is a genus of freshwater ray-finned fishes belonging to the family Mormyridae, the elephantfishes. The fishes in this genus are found in subsaharan Africa.

== Species ==
There are currently four recognized species in this genus:

- Gnathonemus barbatus Poll 1967 (Angolan mormyrid)
- Gnathonemus echidnorhynchus Pellegrin 1924 (Blunt-jawed elephantnose)
- Gnathonemus longibarbis (Hilgendorf 1888) (Longnose stonebasher)
- Gnathonemus petersii (Günther 1862) (Peters's elephantnose fish)
