= Haplochromis beadlei =

Conservation status
- Critically Endangered (IUCN 2.3)

Scientific classification
- Kingdom: Animalia
- Phylum: Chordata
- Class: Actinopterygii
- Order: Cichliformes
- Family: Cichlidae
- Genus: Haplochromis
- Species: H. beadlei

Binomial name
- Haplochromis beadlei Trewavas, 1933

Synonyms
- Paralabidochromis beadlei (Trewavas, 1933)

Species of fish

Haplochromis beadlei is a species of cichlid endemic to Lake Nabugabo in Uganda. This species reaches a length of 11.8 centimetres (4.6 in) SL. Its specific name honours the chemist and zoologist on the 1930-1931 Cambridge Expedition to the East African Lakes, during which the type of this species was collected, Leonard C. Beadle.
