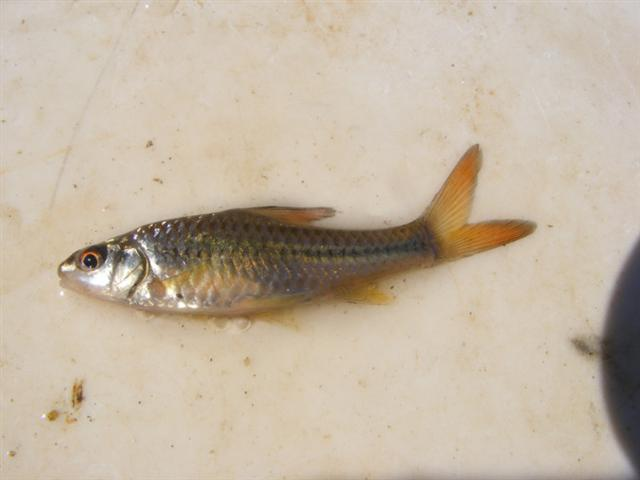

Conservation status
- Least Concern (IUCN 3.1)

Scientific classification
- Kingdom: Animalia
- Phylum: Chordata
- Class: Actinopterygii
- Order: Cypriniformes
- Family: Cyprinidae
- Subfamily: Smiliogastrinae
- Genus: Enteromius
- Species: E. radiatus

Binomial name
- Enteromius radiatus (W. K. H. Peters, 1854)

Synonyms
- Barbus radiatus Peters, 1854; Barbus aurantiacus Boulenger, 1910; Barbus auxartiacus Boulenger, 1910; Barbus banguelensis Boulenger, 1905; Barbus bangwelensis Boulenger, 1905; Barbus doggetti Boulenger, 1904; Barbus myersi Poll, 1939; Barbus paradoxus Poll, 1938; Barbus rogersi Boulenger, 1911; Barbus rubellus Crass, 1960; Beirabarbus okavangoensis Barnard, 1941; Beirabarbus palustris Herre, 1936

= Redeye barb =

Species of fish

The redeye barb or Beira barb (Enteromius radiatus), is a widespread African species of freshwater cyprinid fish which is found from Uganda south to the Limpopo River and Incomati River systems in South Africa.

The redeye barb lives and feeds on the bottom as well as in the middle of the water column and at the surface. It prefers marginal vegetation in rivers but also occurs in marshes and among the fringing vegetation of lakes. In Eswatini, redeye barbs have been recorded in rock pools in the Komati River, in Lake Malawi it has been recorded where the shoreline is rocky, while in the Lake Rukwa drainage system it occurs in rivers which feed the lake and associated smaller waterbodies and in Lake Chiuta it has been reported as reasonably common in the lake and in slower flowing stretches of the inflow streams. In some drainage systems the redeye barb undertakes seasonal migratory movements. The redeye barb is crepuscular and prefers subdued light but it is also active during the night. Its main prey is invertebrates.

There were previously three recognised subspecies but one of these has now been recognised as a separate species Enteromius profundus and the other two are now considered to be morphs of a single monotypic but polymorphic species

The redeye barb is a small barb which has salmon or orange-tinted fins, edged with black and a conspicuous red upper half to the eye. It is countershaded with specimens from Lake Malawi having the dorsal surface coloured olive contrasting with the belly silvery white belly, these are separated by a dark lateral stripe which extends from the caudal fin to the snout in the majority of specimens, although in some this may be rather indistinct. The scales lying immediately above this lateral stripe are heavily spotted creating faint longitudinal stripes, markings which become more obvious in preserved specimens. The head is covered in lines of sensory pits which are apparent when a specimen is examined using a handlens. The meristic data is that there are 3 spines in the dorsal fin and 9 soft rays while the anal fin has 3 spines and 6 soft rays. The maximum size is 12.0 cm standard length.
