= Haplochromis pyrrhocephalus =

Conservation status
- Least Concern (IUCN 3.1)

Scientific classification
- Kingdom: Animalia
- Phylum: Chordata
- Class: Actinopterygii
- Order: Cichliformes
- Family: Cichlidae
- Genus: Haplochromis
- Species: H. pyrrhocephalus

Binomial name
- Haplochromis pyrrhocephalus F. Witte & Witte-Maas, 1987

Synonyms
- Yssichromis pyrrhocephalus (F. Witte & Witte-Maas, 1987)

Species of fish

Haplochromis pyrrhocephalus is a species of cichlid fish endemic to Lake Victoria in East Africa. This species can reach a standard length of 7.3 cm (2.9 in).

Historically a common species, the species rapidly declined and went unrecorded from the mid-1980s to the early 1990s when it reappeared. As in several other Lake Victoria haplochromines of demersal habitats, its sudden decline has been attributed to the introduced Nile perch and eutrophication of the lake's water. After its reappearance it has again become common, likely aided by adaptions to the changes in its habitat. This includes it moving into shallower water (it used to be found mostly at depths of 8–14 m or 26–46 ft), feeding on insects larvae and similar animals (it used to feed on zooplankton), getting a larger caudal peduncle compared to the head (allowing it to swim faster to escape the Nile perch), and larger gills (allowing it to cope with lower oxygen-levels). The ability to make these changes possibly is related to a level of hybridization with close relatives like H. laparogramma.
