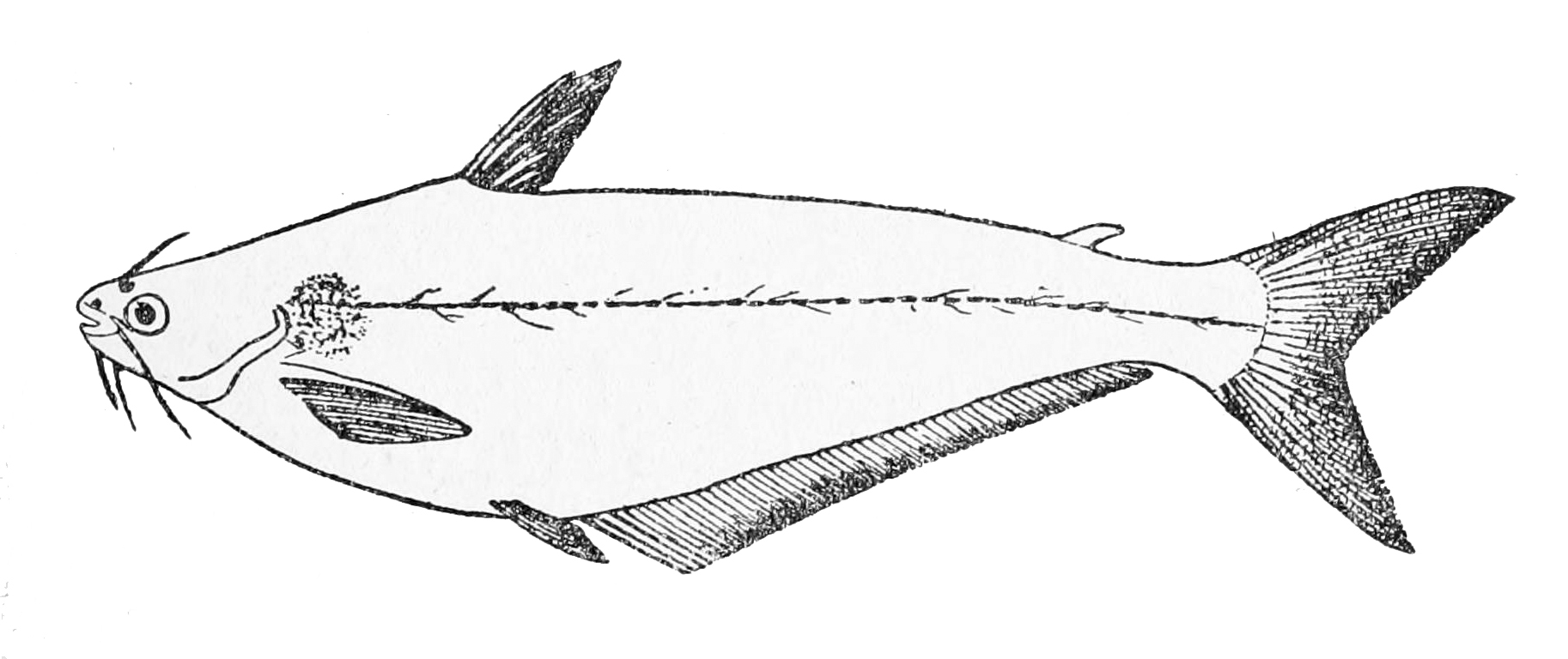

Conservation status
- Least Concern (IUCN 3.1)

Scientific classification
- Kingdom: Animalia
- Phylum: Chordata
- Class: Actinopterygii
- Division: Teleostei
- Order: Siluriformes
- Family: Schilbeidae
- Genus: Schilbe
- Species: S. mystus

Binomial name
- Schilbe mystus (Linnaeus, 1758)

Synonyms
- Schilbe mystus (Linnaeus, 1758) Preferred; Bagrus adansonii Valenciennes, 1840 Synonym; Bagrus depressirostris Peters, 1852; Bagrus schilbeides Valenciennes, 1840; Bagrus schilbeoides Valenciennes, 1840; Bagrus schilboides Valenciennes, 1840; Eutropius adansonii Valenciennes, 1840; Eutropius altipinnis Steindachner, 1894; Eutropius congensis (non Leach, 1818) Misapplied name; Eutropius depressirostris (Peters, 1852); Eutropius grenfelli (non Boulenger, 1900); Eutropius liberiensis (non Hubrecht, 1881); Eutropius mentalis (non Boulenger, 1901); Eutropius nilotica (Rüppell, 1829); Eutropius niloticus (Rüppell, 1829); Eutropius niloticus niloticus (Rüppell, 1829); Eutropius obtusirostris Günther, 1864; Eutropius sp. Not applicable Ambiguous synonym; Hypophthalmus niloticus Rüppell, 1829; Scheilbe mystus (Linnaeus, 1758); Schilbe auratus Joannis, 1835; Schilbe bipinnatus Ehrenberg, 1840; Schilbe bouvieri Rochebrune, 1885; Schilbe dispela (non Günther, 1864); Schilbe dispila (non Günther, 1864); Schilbe emini Pfeffer, 1896; Schilbe hasselquistii Valenciennes, 1840; Schilbe mystus fasciata Steindachner, 1870; Schilbe mystus fasciatus Steindachner, 1870; Schilbe mystus mystus (Linnaeus, 1758); Schilbe niloticus (Rüppell, 1829); Schilbe palmeri (non Svensson, 1933); Schilbe senegalensis (non Günther, 1864); Schilbe senegallus (non Valenciennes, 1840); Schilbe steindachneri Guimaraes, 1884; Schilbe uranoscopus (non Rüppell, 1932); Scilbe mystus (Linnaeus, 1758); Silurus mystus Linnaeus, 1758

= African butter catfish =

Species of fish

The African butter catfish (Schilbe mystus) is a species of fish in the family Schilbeidae. It is native to many major river systems in Africa. Other common names for the fish include butter fish, butter barbel, African glass catfish, lubangu, mystus catfish, silver barbel, and silver catfish. It was originally described as Silurus mystus by Carl Linnaeus in 1758.

== Description ==
The African butter catfish has a compressed body and an adipose fin is always present. It can grow up to 40 centimetres (16 in) TL and has reported up to a maximum weight of 250 grams (8.8 oz). It is a brownish color on the head and the dorsal surface of the fish, and silvery-white on the underside. The fins are usually colorless. The lifespan of the fish is estimated to be 6 to 7 years.

It is commonly found in standing or slowly flowing open water of lakes, ponds, rivers, and shallow swamps where vegetation is present. It is occasionally found in sandy or rocky streams, or shallow flood plains. It feeds from mid-water and surface waters on fish, insects, crustaceans, ostracods, snails, seeds, leaves, roots, diatoms, algae, and fruit. It has been noted to feed on the fish species Elephant snout (Hyperopisus bebe) and Nile tilapia (Oreochromis niloticus). The species is most active at night or in subdued light. It spawns in the rainy season in September and October, by migrating into the floodwaters and tributaries of rivers and streams to spawn. It may spawn in multiple locations, depositing eggs on vegetation.

== Uses ==
This fish is of commercial importance in many parts of Africa as an important food fish. It is also sold in the aquarium trade. In northern Africa, the fish faces threats from dams, water pollution, drought, and water depletion. Overall, the species is listed by the IUCN as Least Concern for central, northern, northeastern, and western Africa. In eastern Africa, the species is in serious decline due to overfishing and exploitation and is assessed regionally as Vulnerable.
