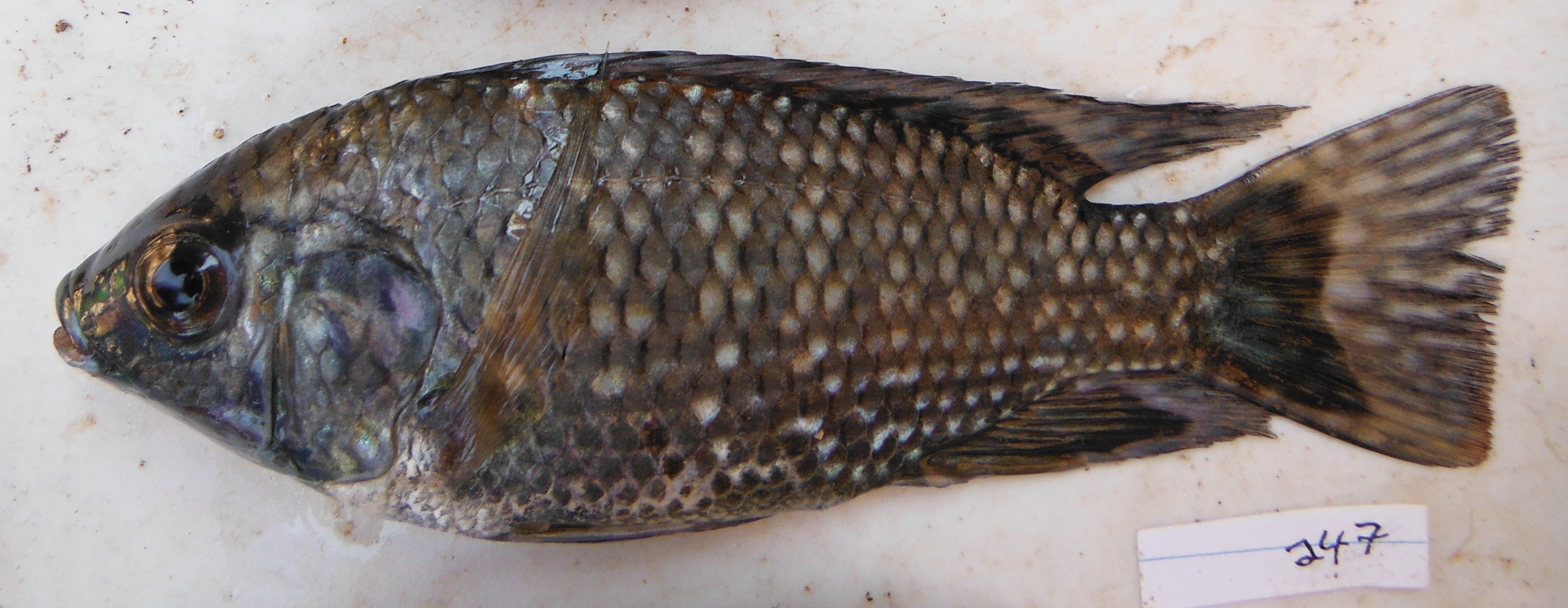
- Oreochromis leucostictus, male, from a fishpond near Songea, Tanzania, in 2012.

Conservation status
- Least Concern (IUCN 3.1)

Scientific classification
- Kingdom: Animalia
- Phylum: Chordata
- Class: Actinopterygii
- Order: Cichliformes
- Family: Cichlidae
- Genus: Oreochromis
- Species: O. leucostictus

Binomial name
- Oreochromis leucostictus (Trewavas, 1933)

Synonyms
- Tilapia leucosticta Trewavas, 1933; Sarotherodon leucosticta (Trewavas, 1933); Sarotherodon leucostictum (Trewavas, 1933); Sarotherodon leucostictus (Trewavas, 1933); Tilapia trewavasae Poll, 1939

= Oreochromis leucostictus =

Species of fish

Oreochromis leucostictus (the blue-spotted tilapia) is a species of cichlid native to Albertine Rift Valley lakes and associated rivers in DR Congo and Uganda. It has now been introduced widely elsewhere East Africa, and is believed to have negative ecological impact, particularly on native tilapias. This species is reported to reach a standard length of up to 36.3 cm (14.3 in), but is usually much smaller. It is exploited by small-scale fishery and aquaculture operations.

== Description ==
Oreochromis leucostictus is a relatively deep-bodied tilapia with a fairly small mouth, narrow, rounded head and high back. Juvenile are pale, countershaded and have around 8 thin faint dark bars on the flank beneath the dorsal fin, with other bars on the head and tail. The fins are faintly spotted and there is a rather vague dark 'tilapia mark' based on the soft dorsal fin. Adults of both sexes are characterised by white spotting on the flanks and fins. Mature males are very dark, almost black, sometimes with a blue-green iridescence, and the white spots are very conspicuous. The eye is bright yellow and crossed by an oblique bar. Mature males have elongated filamentous tips to the dorsal and anal fins, but do not have enlarged jaws (in contrast to species like Oreochromis mossambicus). Young fishes have numerous small slender tricuspid teeth, but they become stouter in larger fish, and sometimes bicuspid. Overall, there are usually 4–6 rows of teeth, occasionally up to 8 in larger fish. The lower pharyngeal bone is slender, with numerous crowded teeth. There are 3–5 upper gill rakers, 1 on the angle and 19–23 lower rakers. The dorsal fin has 15–18 spines and 11–13 rays. The anal fin generally has 3-spines, although a single 4-spined individual has been reported, and 9–11 rays. There are 28–31 scales in the lateral line series. Adults are reported to grow to a total length of 28–30 cm in Lake Victoria, but they mature at much smaller sizes in smaller water bodies, with ripening females reportedly as small as 8 cm.

== Behaviour and ecology ==
Oreochromis leucostictus is a typical maternal mouthbrooding cichlid, like all other known members of the genus. During the breeding season, males are conspicuously coloured, defend territories over open sand/mud areas where they construct a 'bower' or mate attraction structure. In this species, the bower is a simple circular pit, dug at depths of less than 60 cm deep, at least along the margins of Lake Victoria. Females visit the bowers of males, laying clutches with one or more, and immediately picking up the eggs in her mouth. The offspring are brooded until they are capable of independent feeding. Like most other members of the genus, the female probably guards them and will retrieve them in her mouth at night or when disturbed.

Oreochromis leucostictus prefers shallow weedy habitats, such as lagoons and bays around the edges of larger lakes. It naturally co-occurs with the Nile tilapia, Oreochromis niloticus, which favours rather deeper waters, so the two species appear to have complementary niches. They feed mainly on bottom sediments or plankton, ingesting mainly microscopic plants and cyanobacteria, along with small invertebrates.

== Distribution ==
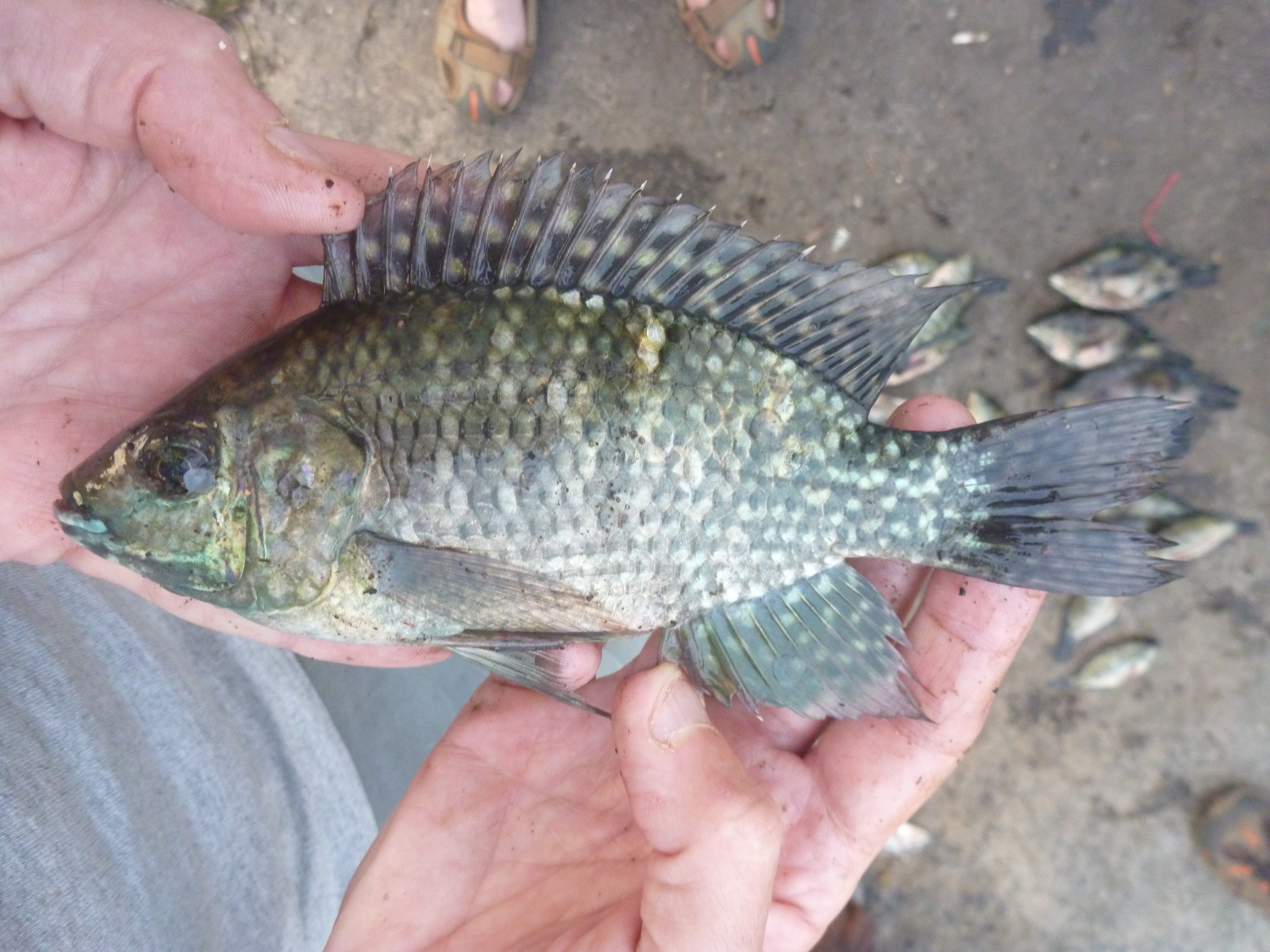
Oreochromis leucostictus, male, from Lake Malimbe in the Lake Victoria catchment, Tanzania, 2016 [MolEcoFish project]

The natural distribution of this fish is in the catchments of Lakes Edward, George and Albert, in Uganda and eastern Democratic Republic of Congo. It was introduced in Lake Victoria into the 1950s, and is now abundant there, having largely supplanted the native endemic Oreochromis variabilis, although the latter is known to persist in some rocky offshore islands. It was later introduced into Lake Naivasha in Kenya, where it hybridised with and then replaced the formerly abundant Kenyan endemic Oreochromis spilurus nigra. Further introductions to Kenya have continued and molecular genetic studies indicate that O. leucostictus has begun to hybridise with endemic populations of O. niloticus at a number of sites, including Lake Baringo and the hot springs around Lake Bogoria. The species has also been widely distributed in Tanzania, probably as a contaminant of Nile tilapia sourced from Lake Victoria and stocked for aquaculture or attempted fishery improvement. Here too, feral populations are becoming established and hybrids with native species such as Oreochromis urolepis have been reported.

== Exploitation and conservation issues ==
The species is fished where it is found, and widely farmed in small-scale fish ponds, but it is known to mature at small sizes in ponds, a trait undesirable for commercial aquaculture, because ponds are quickly filled up with numerous small fish of low market value. This trait is presumably well developed in this species because it is adapted to live in shallow marginal habitats and so is likely to find itself cut off in pools which may eventually dry up and where larger fish are vulnerable to predators such as birds. Thus, it is unfortunate that the species has been so widely distributed. In addition, it seems to have a propensity to hybridise with native Oreochromis species, leading to genetic contamination and creating hybrid swarms, sometimes apparently replacing the native species altogether eventually. Thus, this species seems to be rather a menace to the maintenance of biodiversity and in particular to the maintenance of wild genetic diversity of tilapias, an important food fish throughout the tropics.
