= Haplochromis michaeli =

Conservation status
- Critically endangered, possibly extinct (IUCN 3.1)

Scientific classification
- Kingdom: Animalia
- Phylum: Chordata
- Class: Actinopterygii
- Order: Cichliformes
- Family: Cichlidae
- Genus: Haplochromis
- Species: H. michaeli

Binomial name
- Haplochromis michaeli Trewavas, 1928

Synonyms
- Harpagochromis michaeli (Trewavas, 1928)

Species of fish

Haplochromis michaeli is a species of cichlid endemic to Lake Victoria. It is critically endangered, though it may now be extinct. This species can reach a length of 14.5 centimetres (5.7 in) SL. The specific name honours the collector of the type, the British fisheries scientist Michael Graham (1888-1972).
