= Haplochromis gowersii =

Conservation status
- Data Deficient (IUCN 3.1)

Scientific classification
- Kingdom: Animalia
- Phylum: Chordata
- Class: Actinopterygii
- Order: Cichliformes
- Family: Cichlidae
- Genus: Haplochromis
- Species: H. gowersii

Binomial name
- Haplochromis gowersii Trewavas, 1928

Synonyms
- Haplochromis gowersi (lapsus); Prognathochromis gowersi (Trewavas, 1928)

Species of fish

Haplochromis gowersii is a species of cichlid endemic to Lake Victoria. This species can reach a length of 22.4 centimetres (8.8 in) SL. The specific name of this taxon honours the former Governor of Uganda William Frederick Gowers (1875-1954).
