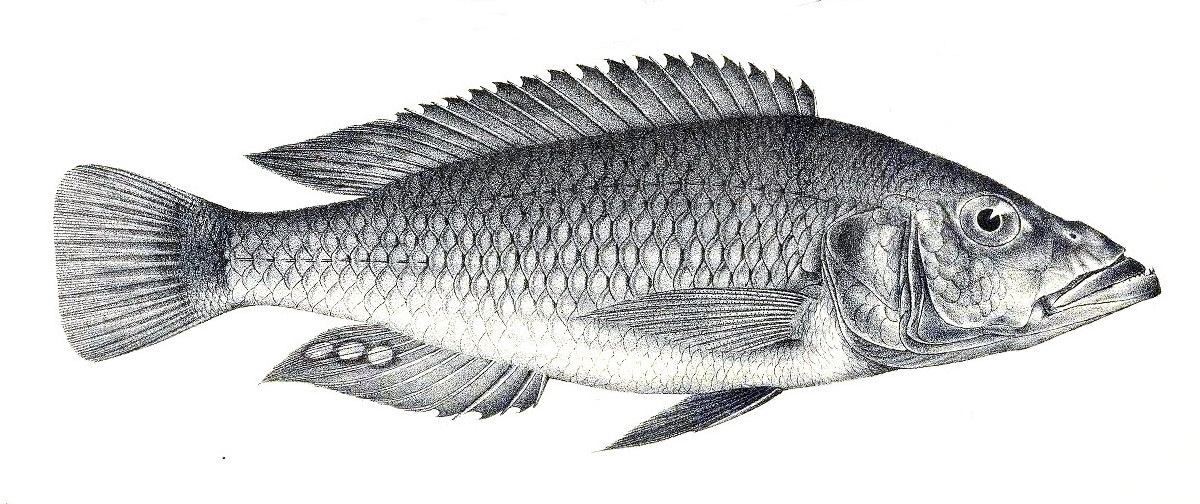

Conservation status
- Critically endangered, possibly extinct (IUCN 3.1)

Scientific classification
- Kingdom: Animalia
- Phylum: Chordata
- Class: Actinopterygii
- Order: Cichliformes
- Family: Cichlidae
- Genus: Haplochromis
- Species: H. longirostris

Binomial name
- Haplochromis longirostris (Hilgendorf, 1888)

Synonyms
- Paratilapia longirostris Hilgendorf, 1888; Hemichromis longirostris (Hilgendorf, 1888); Prognathochromis longirostris (Hilgendorf, 1888); Haplochromis gracilicauda Regan, 1922; Haplochromis tenuis Borodin, 1931

= Haplochromis longirostris =

Species of fish

Haplochromis longirostris is a species of cichlid endemic to Lake Victoria. It is critically endangered, though it may now be extinct. This species can reach a length of 14.5 centimetres (5.7 in) SL.
