= Haplochromis macrognathus =

Conservation status
- Critically endangered, possibly extinct (IUCN 3.1)

Scientific classification
- Kingdom: Animalia
- Phylum: Chordata
- Class: Actinopterygii
- Order: Cichliformes
- Family: Cichlidae
- Genus: Haplochromis
- Species: H. macrognathus

Binomial name
- Haplochromis macrognathus Regan, 1922

Synonyms
- Prognathochromis macrognathus (Regan, 1922)

Species of fish

Haplochromis macrognathus is a species of cichlid fish endemic to Lake Victoria in East Africa. This piscivorous species can reach a standard length of 17.4 cm (6.9 in). Last seen in the early 1980s, it may now be extinct.
