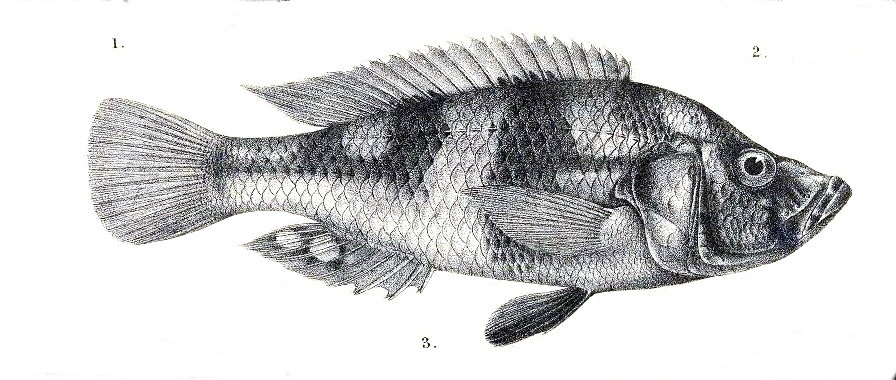

Conservation status
- Critically endangered, possibly extinct (IUCN 3.1)

Scientific classification
- Kingdom: Animalia
- Phylum: Chordata
- Class: Actinopterygii
- Order: Cichliformes
- Family: Cichlidae
- Genus: Haplochromis
- Species: H. flavipinnis

Binomial name
- Haplochromis flavipinnis (Boulenger, 1906)

Synonyms
- Pelmatochromis flavipinnis Boulenger, 1906; Prognathochromis flavipinnis (Boulenger, 1906)

= Haplochromis flavipinnis =

Species of fish

Haplochromis flavipinnis is a species of cichlid endemic to Lake Victoria though it may now be extinct. This species can reach a length of 15.6 centimetres (6.1 in) SL.
