= Haplochromis nigrescens =

Conservation status
- Data Deficient (IUCN 3.1)

Scientific classification
- Kingdom: Animalia
- Phylum: Chordata
- Class: Actinopterygii
- Order: Cichliformes
- Family: Cichlidae
- Genus: Haplochromis
- Species: H. nigrescens

Binomial name
- Haplochromis nigrescens (Pellegrin, 1909)

Synonyms
- Astatotilapia nigrescens Pellegrin, 1909; Prognathochromis nigrescens (Pellegrin, 1909)

Species of fish

Haplochromis nigrescens is a species of cichlid endemic to Lake Victoria. This species can reach a length of 11.5 centimetres (4.5 in) TL.
