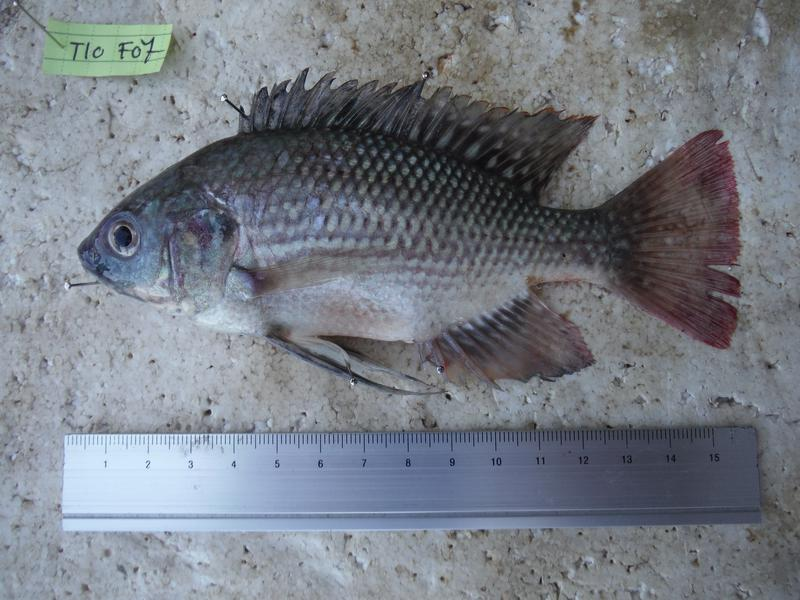

Conservation status
- Near Threatened (IUCN 3.1)

Scientific classification
- Kingdom: Animalia
- Phylum: Chordata
- Class: Actinopterygii
- Order: Cichliformes
- Family: Cichlidae
- Genus: Oreochromis
- Species: O. esculentus

Binomial name
- Oreochromis esculentus (M. Graham, 1928)

Synonyms
- Tilapia esculenta M. Graham, 1928; Sarotherodon esculentus (M. Graham, 1928)

= Oreochromis esculentus =

Singida tilapia

Species of fish

Oreochromis esculentus, the Singida tilapia or Graham's tilapia, is a species of cichlid endemic to the Lake Victoria basin, including some of its satellite lakes such as Kyoga, in Tanzania, Uganda, and Kenya. Its common name refers to Lake Singida, but this population is the result of an introduction that happened in the 1950s. This fish was historically highly valued by local fishermen, who know it as ngege.

In 1927-1928 Michael Graham conducted the first ever systematic Fisheries Survey of Lake Victoria. In his official report of the expedition, Graham wrote that "The ngege or satu Tilapia esculenta, is the most important food fish of the lake, whether for native or non-native consumption. No other fish equals it in the quality of the flesh. It is convenient size for trade, travels well and is found in much greater numbers than other important fish, such as semutundu (Luganda), Bagrus sp.''. Furthermore, Graham noted that "The introduction of the European flax gill-net of 5 inch mesh has undoubtedly caused a diminution in the number of ngege in those parts of the Kavirondo Gulf, the northern shore of the lake, the Sesse Islands and Smith's Sound which are conveniently situated to markets".

Oreochromis esculentus has been introduced into the Pangani River basin, where it presents a threat to the native relative O. jipe.

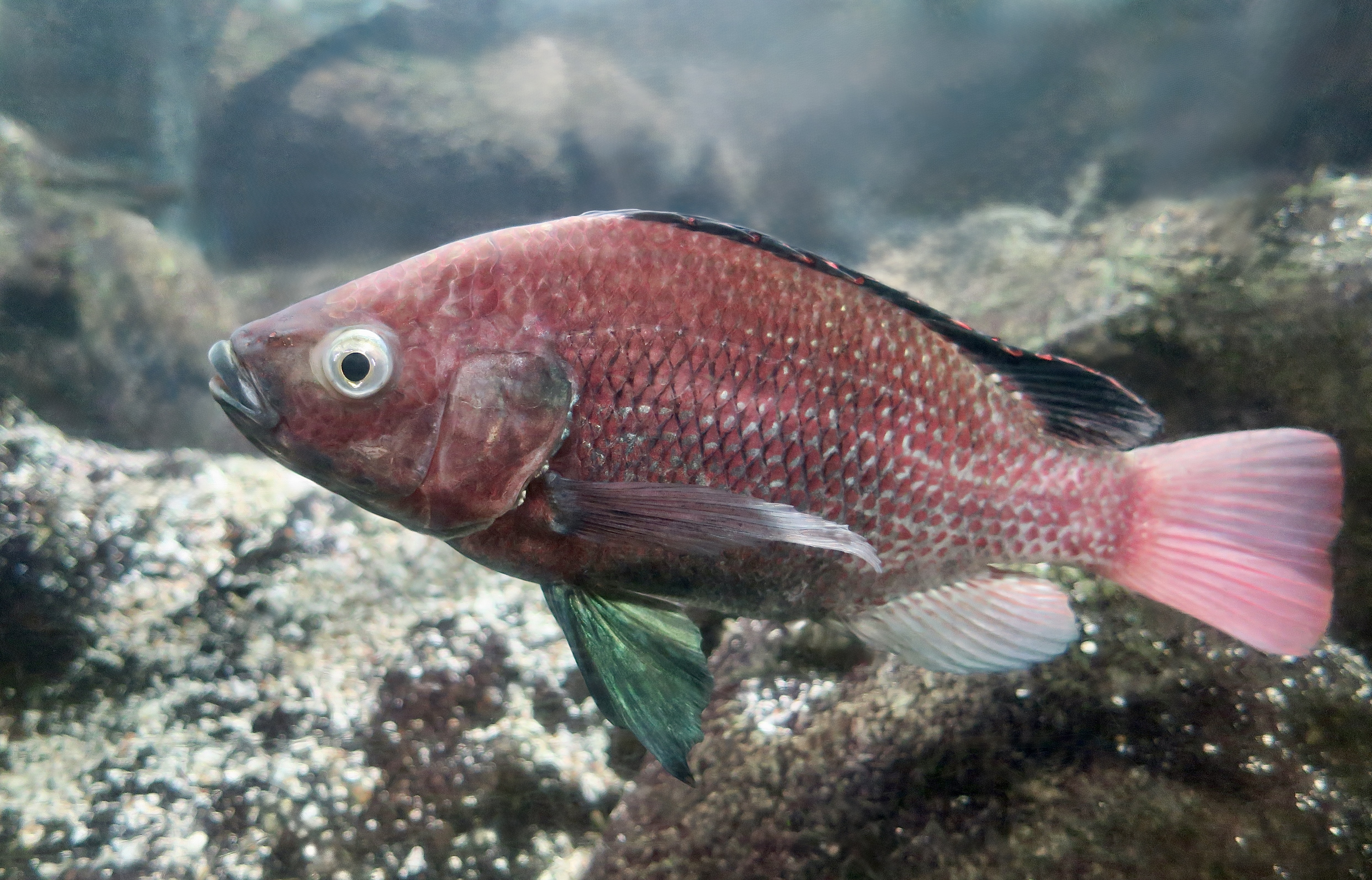
A Singida tilapia male at New York Aquarium.

== Description ==
This species reaches a standard length of up to 50 cm (20 in), although it only rarely surpasses 30 cm (12 in).

=== Conservation ===
The ngege has declined precipitously in Lake Victoria due to early overfishing with the initial introduction of flax gill nets, followed by the introduced predatory Nile perch (Lates niloticus) and the highly competitive Nile tilapia (Oreochromis niloticus), with possible effects also attributable to the introduce Oreochromis leucostictus, Coptodon rendalli, and Coptodon zillii. Other contributing, interrelated factors include habitat degradation in marginal waters and river mouths, profound changes in the limnology of the open lake, and climate change. The main population in Lake Victoria declined by more than 80% in the last 40 years. Indeed, ngege appeared to have been extirpated in the main lake, with isolated surviving populations in marginal satellite lakes and impoundments. The population has been variously treated as endangered or near-threatened. More recently ngege have been rediscovered in Lake Victoria in one very limited area. The other endemic tilapiine, Oreochromis variabilis, persists near the lake outlet in Uganda and possibly in several other places.
