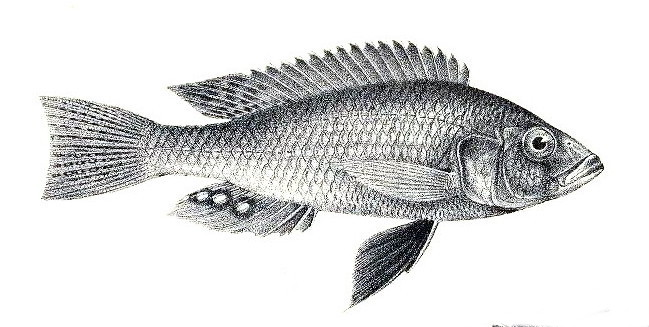

Conservation status
- Critically endangered, possibly extinct (IUCN 3.1)

Scientific classification
- Kingdom: Animalia
- Phylum: Chordata
- Class: Actinopterygii
- Order: Cichliformes
- Family: Cichlidae
- Genus: Haplochromis
- Species: H. guiarti

Binomial name
- Haplochromis guiarti (Pellegrin, 1904)

Synonyms
- Tilapia guiarti Pellegrin, 1904; Astatotilapia guiarti (Pellegrin, 1904); Harpagochromis guiarti (Pellegrin, 1904); Paratilapia guiarti (Pellegrin, 1904); Haplochromis nigroventralis Lohberger, 1929

= Haplochromis guiarti =

Species of fish

Haplochromis guiarti is a species of cichlid endemic to Lake Victoria though it may now be extinct. This species can reach a length of 17.7 centimetres (7.0 in) SL. The specific name honours the French parasitologist Jules Guiart (1870-1965), who was a friend of Jacques Pellegrin's.
