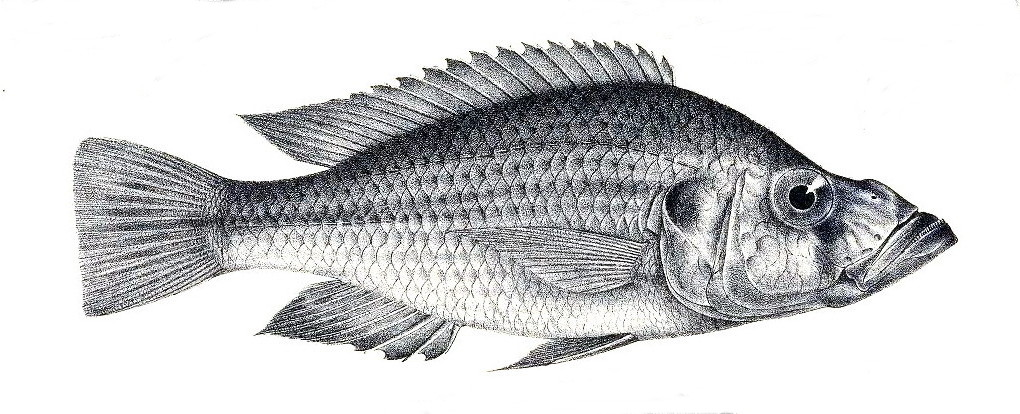

Conservation status
- Data Deficient (IUCN 3.1)

Scientific classification
- Kingdom: Animalia
- Phylum: Chordata
- Class: Actinopterygii
- Order: Cichliformes
- Family: Cichlidae
- Genus: Haplochromis
- Species: H. prognathus

Binomial name
- Haplochromis prognathus (Pellegrin, 1904)

Synonyms
- Paratilapia prognatha Pellegrin, 1904; Prognathochromis prognathus (Pellegrin, 1904); Haplochromis macrodon Regan, 1922; Haplochromis taeniatus Regan, 1922; Haplochromis rebeli Lohberger, 1929; Haplochromis steindachneri Lohberger, 1929; Haplochromis versluysi Lohberger, 1929; Haplochromis lamprogenys Fowler, 1936

= Haplochromis prognathus =

Species of fish

Haplochromis prognathus is a species of cichlid endemic to Lake Victoria. This species can reach a length of 14.1 centimetres (5.6 in) SL.
