= Schilbe intermedius =

Conservation status
- Least Concern (IUCN 3.1)

Scientific classification
- Kingdom: Animalia
- Phylum: Chordata
- Class: Actinopterygii
- Order: Siluriformes
- Family: Schilbeidae
- Genus: Schilbe
- Species: S. intermedius

Binomial name
- Schilbe intermedius (Rüppell, 1832)

Synonyms
- Schilbe senegallus Valenciennes, 1840; Schilbe dispila Günther, 1864; Schilbe senegalensis Günther, 1864; Eutropius lemairii Boulenger, 1900; Schilbe palmeri Svensson, 1933

Species of fish

Schilbe intermedius or the silver butter catfish is a widespread species of African catfish. It seems closely related to Schilbe uranoscopus and these two species are sympatric over part of their ranges.

== Distribution ==
Widespread in sub-Saharan Africa from the Senegal River across to Somalia and south as far as the Pongola River in South Africa.

== Biology ==
Schilbe intermedius is a potamodromous catfish. It is reported to be a pelagic species which occurs mainly in shallow waters and open waters of lakes, it migrates to the surface at night. Generally found in the lower reaches of river systems. It feeds on a fish, either swallowed whole or in pieces and a wide range of invertebrates including terrestrial insects. It is mainly piscivorous once it reaches 13–34 cm in length. Schilbe intermedius rarely grows to lengths greater than 30 cm. It breeds throughout the year peaking in the rainy season when it migrates into rivers in fairly compact schools to spawn in floodwater pools. In one study the most common prey item was redeye barb, a cyprinid, which made up 29% of all identifiable fish species sampled from the catfishes stomachs.

== Description ==
There are two populations of the species one with and one without an adipose fin. The population lacking an adipose fin are from the north and west of Africa while the populations with an adipose fin are from the central, east and south of Africa. Quite distinctive with a large shovel mouth surrounded by 4-6 nasal barbs and the eyes slightly protrude from head. The anal fin is long, extending from vent almost to the caudal fin. It has four pairs of short, barbels around the mouth. The ground colour is silvery, brownish to olive on the back and upper parts of the head. There are two dark grey to olive bands, the longest running along the lateral line from the upper gill cover to the caudal peduncle, where this band starts on the upper gill cover there is a dark humeral spot. The second shorter band runs from the beginning of the pectoral fins to the end of the anal fin. The fins are transparent, although the anal fin has a dark band near the body and there is a dark streak which runs into each lobe of the deeply forked caudal fin.

== Fisheries ==
Schilbe intermedius is fished for food but tends not to be the primary target for fishermen who usually catch it when hunting for other species.
