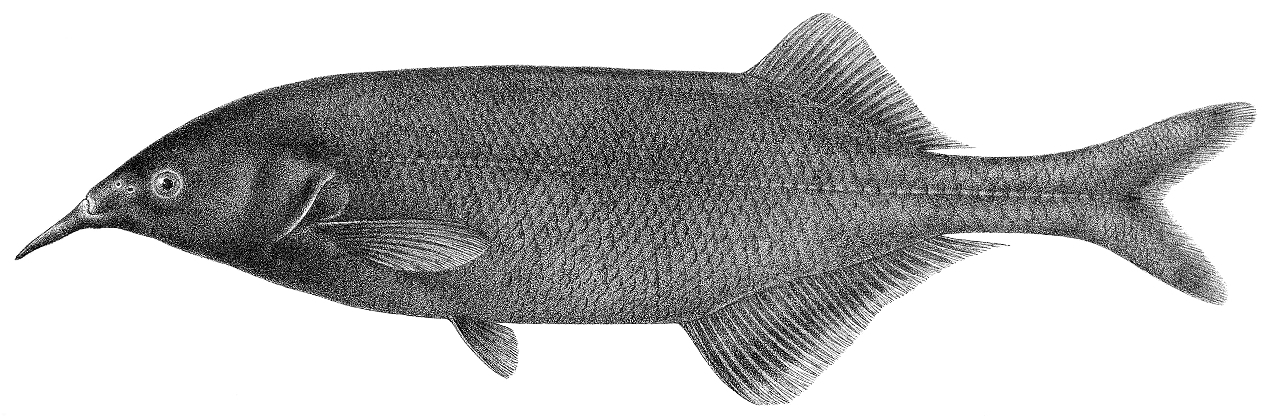

Conservation status
- Least Concern (IUCN 3.1)

Scientific classification
- Kingdom: Animalia
- Phylum: Chordata
- Class: Actinopterygii
- Division: Teleostei
- Order: Osteoglossiformes
- Family: Mormyridae
- Genus: Gnathonemus
- Species: G. longibarbis

Binomial name
- Gnathonemus longibarbis (Hilgendorf, 1888)

Synonyms
- Mormyrus longibarbis

= Longnose stonebasher =

Species of fish

The longnose stonebasher (Gnathonemus longibarbis) is a species of fish in the family Mormyridae. Its natural habitats are rivers, freshwater lakes, freshwater marshes, and inland deltas.

== Distribution ==
The longnose stonebasher is found in Burundi, Kenya, Rwanda, Tanzania, Uganda, and around Lake Tanganyika in the Democratic Republic of the Congo and Zambia. It has been found at depths from 27 to 45 metres (90 to 150 ft).

== Diet ==
The longnose stonebasher has been found to feed on the bottom of water sources amongst minimal vegetation. The fish mainly eats insects such as larvae but has also been known to eat a variety of arthropods, fish eggs and worms.
