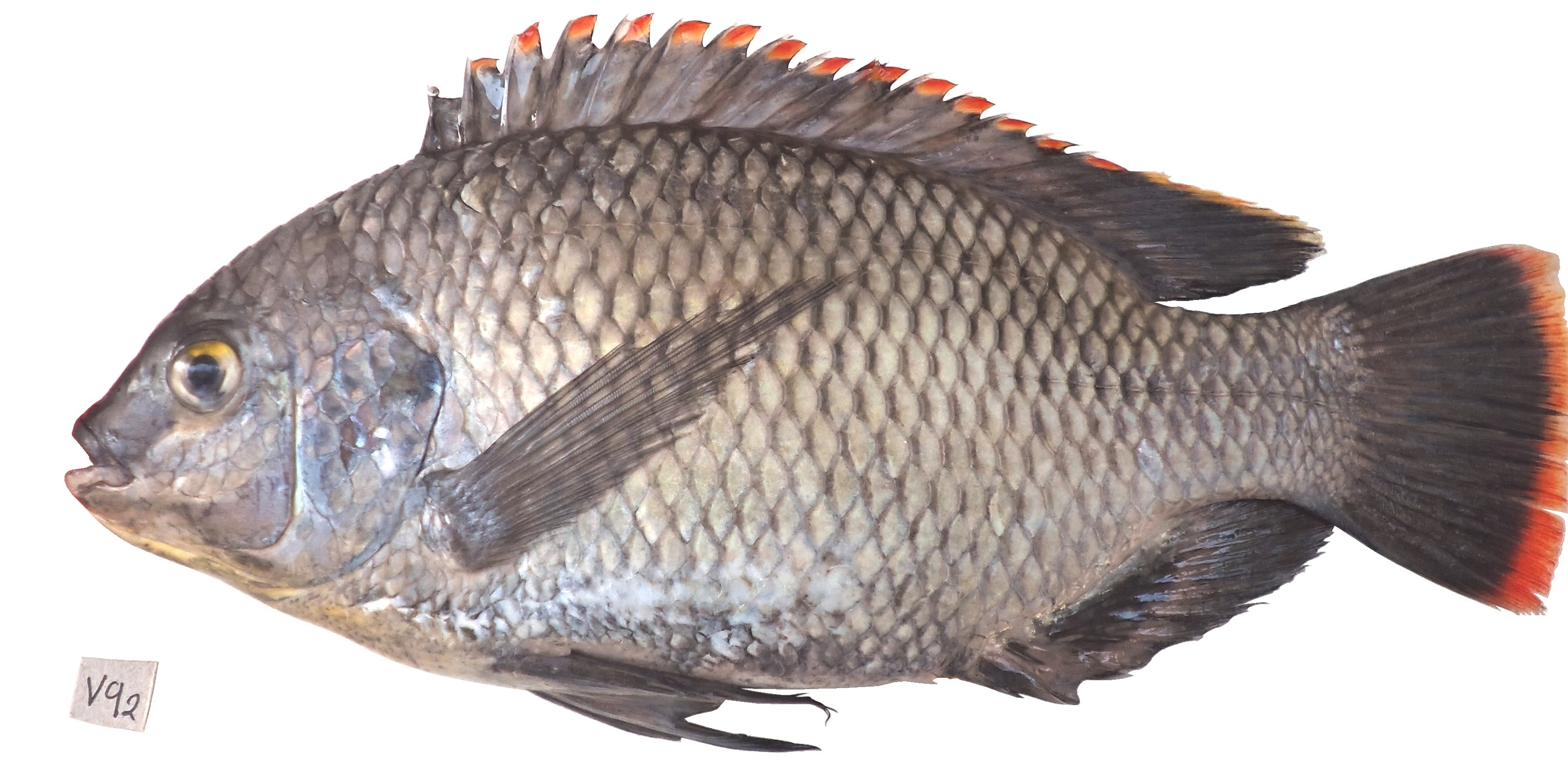
- O. variabilis, male, from Makobe; Island in Lake Victoria, Tanzania

Conservation status
- Near Threatened (IUCN 3.1)

Scientific classification
- Kingdom: Animalia
- Phylum: Chordata
- Class: Actinopterygii
- Order: Cichliformes
- Family: Cichlidae
- Genus: Oreochromis
- Species: O. variabilis

Binomial name
- Oreochromis variabilis (Boulenger, 1906)

Synonyms
- Tilapia variabilis Boulenger, 1906; Nyasalapia variabilis (Boulenger, 1906); Sarotherodon variabilis (Boulenger, 1906)

= Oreochromis variabilis =

Victoria tilapia

Species of fish

Oreochromis variabilis, the Victoria tilapia, is a species of African cichlid native to Lake Victoria and its tributaries, Lake Kyoga, Lake Kwania, and Lake Bisina (Salisbury), as well as being found in the Victoria Nile above Murchison Falls. This species can reach a standard length of 30 cm (12 in). This species is important to local commercial fisheries and is potentially important in aquaculture. It is also found in the aquarium trade.

Despite its common name, it is not the only tilapia native to Lake Victoria. The equally threatened O. esculentus has a similar distribution.

== Description ==
Oreochromis variabilis has typical characteristics of a cichlid fish: long dorsal fin with both spiny and soft rays, a broken lateral line, a single pair of nostrils and a single lower pharyngeal bone. Like other typical 'tilapias', it has relatively small closely packed teeth, numerous gill rakers and juveniles have a dark 'tilapia spot' at the base of the soft-rayed part of the dorsal fin. Like other members of the subgenus Nyasalapia, the mature males develop a long, branched genital tassel and construct complex display structures or bowers on the bottom mud, characterised by a raised central platform, in contrast to the simple saucer-shaped pits excavated by other Oreochromis. They also lack the enlarged jaws seen in mature males of the Oreochromis mossambicus group. Courting males are typically black (sometimes with a blue-green sheen), with bright red margins to the dorsal and tailfins. These characteristics are shared with the allopatric species O. malagarasi (Lake Tanganyika catchment) and O. rukwaensis (Lake Rukwa, and recently reported also from the upper part of the Great Ruaha catchment). An apparently unique feature of O. variabilis, and the source of its name, is its colour polymorphism. A small proportion of individuals of both sexes, although mainly females, show a disrupted melanin distribution, resulting in a pale orange or whitish fish with irregular dark blotches on the fins and body. This kind of pattern is known in haplochromine cichlid fishes from African great lakes (notably the Lake Malawi 'mbuna' cichlids), where it is again mainly expressed in females. It bears some resemblance to the 'red tilapia' artificially selected in the aquaculture industry. These were known as 'Maradadi' among at least some of the fisherfolk on Lake Victoria, when this species was still an important food fish on the lake. Oreochromis variabilis also has a rather distinctive head profile, with a 'bump' just above the eyes, rather like the Lake Malawi 'chambo' species (males of which lack red fin margins), but less strongly expressed in O. rukwaensis and O. malagarasi.

== Reproductive biology ==
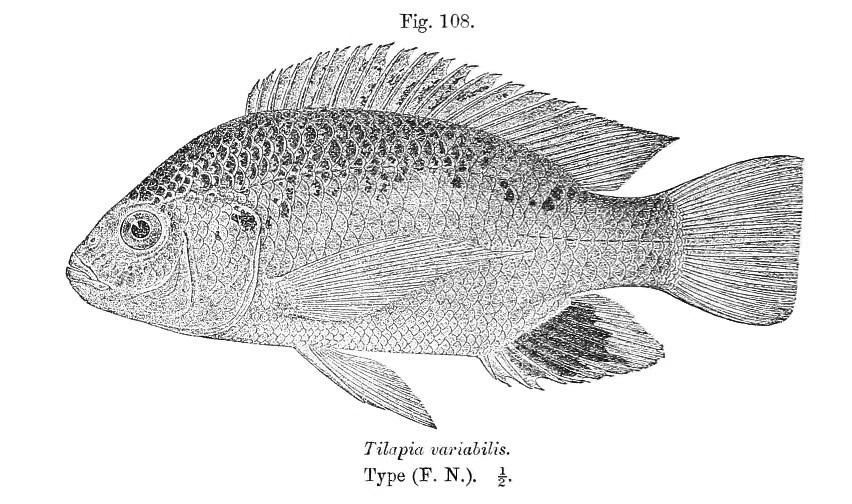
Oreochromis variabilis: the holotype of Tilapia variabilis, as illustrated in Boulenger 1907: a specimen of the blotched 'maradadi' morph.

Like all other known Oreochromis, O. variabilis is a maternal mouthbrooder. Males are conspicuously coloured and aggregate in shallow waters, where they aggressively defend territories centred around their courtship bower. Females visit a number of males, laying batches of eggs with several, but rejecting many others. Females quickly pick up the eggs in their mouths and carry them for several weeks before releasing them to feed. Young are guarded in shallow weedy or rocky areas and may be re-admitted to their mother's mouth until they reach a length of about 15mm. In Lake Victoria, fishes were recorded as maturing at around 20 cm TL (total length), but in smaller water bodies, they might breed at about 16 cm TL. Females produce around 320–550 eggs, averaging around 2.5–4.5 cm in diameter. The bowers built by males are complex structures, with a raised central shallow saucer about 13–25 cm in diameter with a rim around 2 cm high, surrounded by 6–12 small pits, all contained within a larger pit, 30–90 cm in diameter, with a raised perimeter wall.

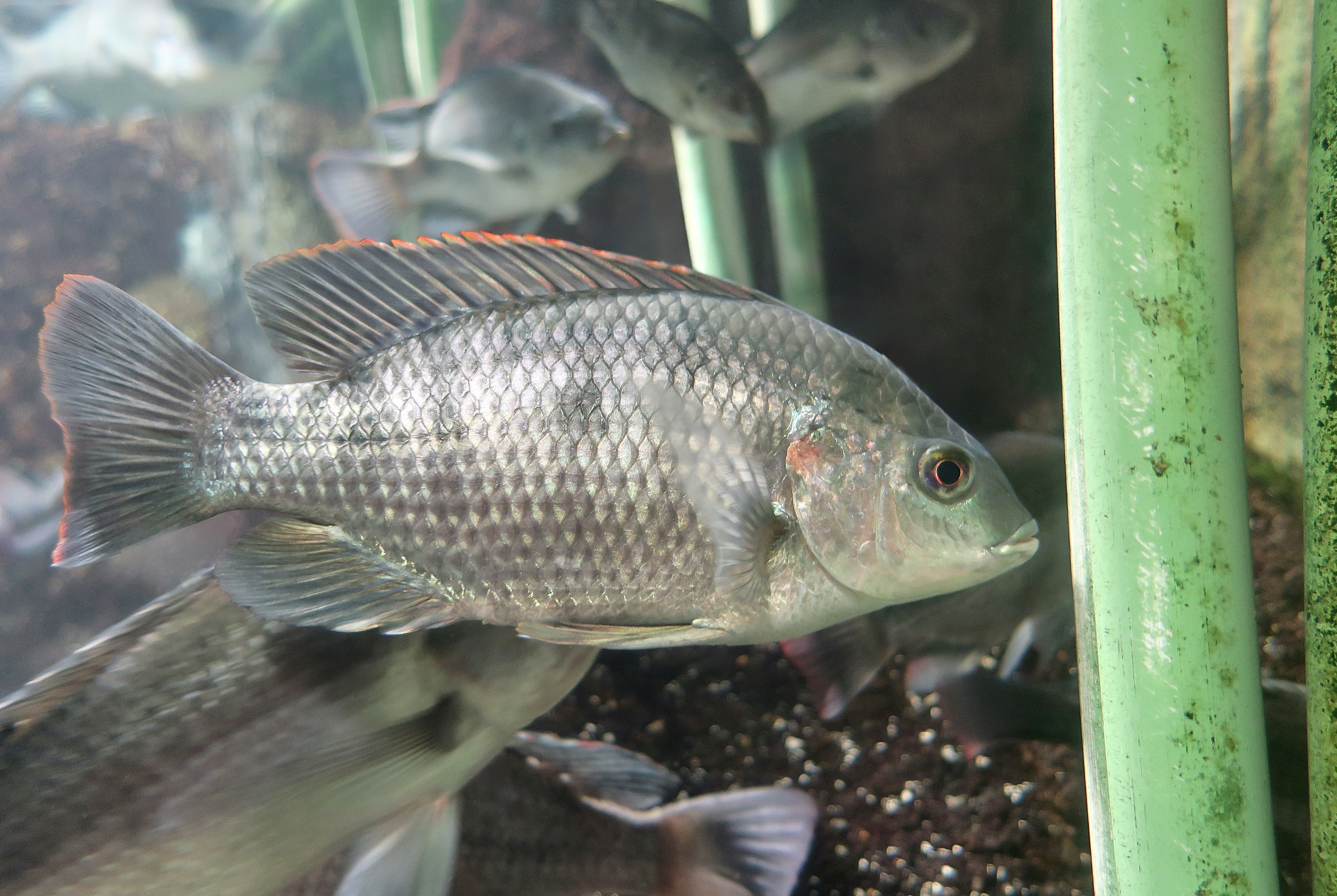
A Victoria tilapia at New York Aquarium.

== Ecology ==
In its natural habitat, O. variabilis frequents shallow areas, both rocky and weedy, while the congeneric O. esculentus dominated the offshore habitats. Juveniles have been reported to feed on plankton, while adults mainly feed on bottom sediments or biofilms on rocks and other hard surfaces.

== Current status of populations ==
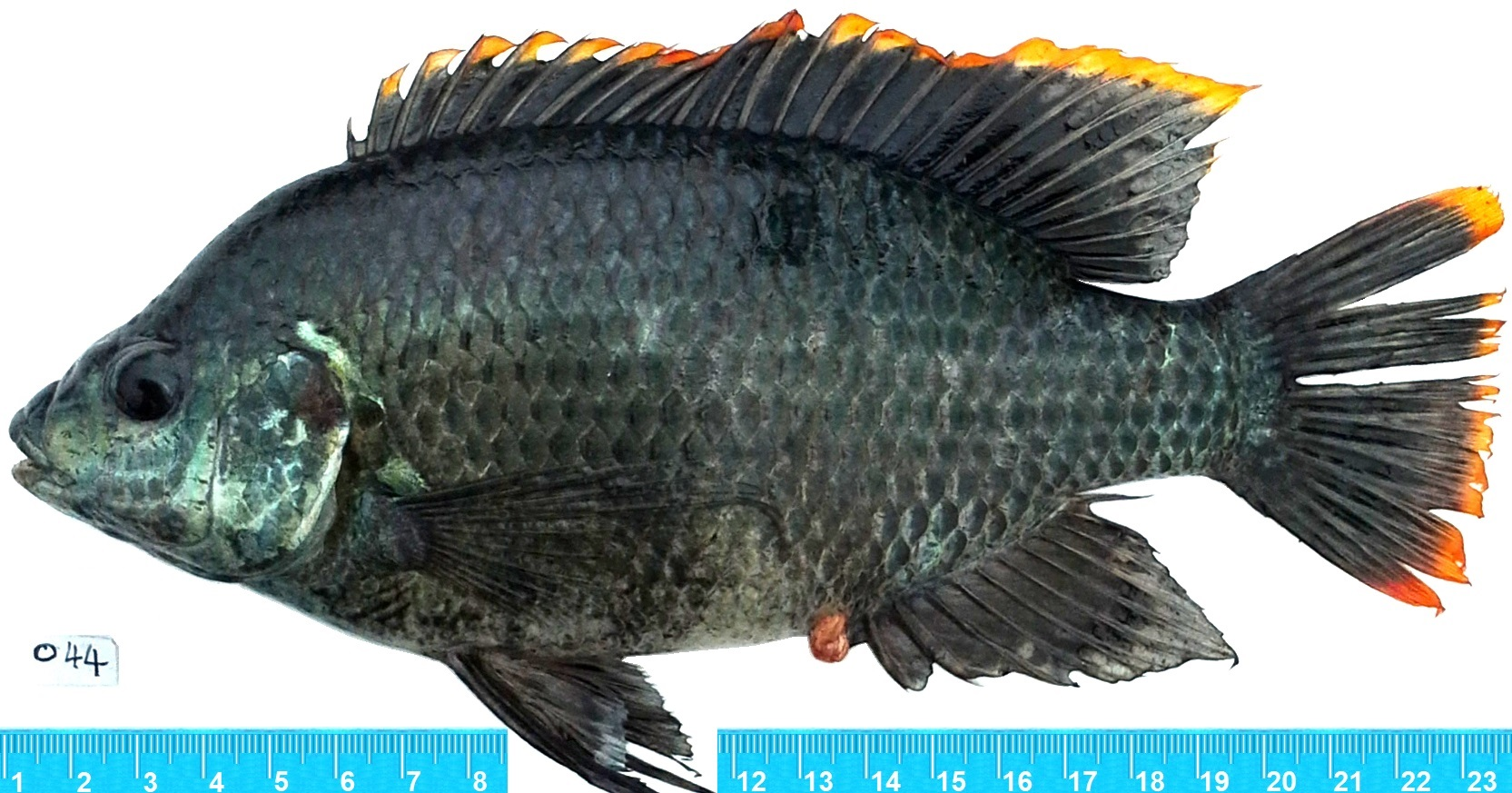
Probable Oreochromis variabilis male showing full breeding dress, from a fishpond at Njombe, Tanzania in January 2017.

The species is listed as near threatened by IUCN, with population declines attributed to the introduction of predatory Nile perch and competing non-native tilapias. However, populations continued to be reported from satellite lakes in the catchment which had remained unstocked with these exotics. More recently, in 2016, individuals were recorded on the rocky offshore island of Makobe in the Tanzanian part of the lake.
