= Thozama Gangi =

South African corporate executive

- Born: South Africa
- Citizenship: South Africa
- Education: University of Transkei (Bachelor of Science in Mathematics and Education); University of Warwick (Master of Science in Engineering Business Management); Sorbonne University (Master of Leadership and Strategy)
- Occupation: Corporate executive
- Years active: 2001–present
- Title: Chief executive officer of Eskom Uganda Limited

Thozama Gangi is a South African businesswoman and corporate executive, who is the chief executive officer of Eskom Uganda Limited, a Ugandan subsidiary of the South African energy utility company Eskom. She assumed her current position in 2015, replacing Nokwanda Mngeni.

== Background and education ==
Thozama was born in South Africa, and she attended local elementary and secondary schools. Her first degree is a Bachelor of Science in Mathematics and Education, awarded by the University of Transkei (now Walter Sisulu University). She also has a Master of Science in Engineering Business Management, obtained from the University of Warwick in the United Kingdom. She also holds a Master of Leadership and Strategy, awarded by Sorbonne University in France.

== Career ==
At the time she was appointed CEO at Eskom Uganda, Thazoma had been with Eskom for 14 years, having joined circa 2001. She started out at the Matimba Power Station as a boiler engineering manager. She worked in various positions in the company, with concentration in the company's generation business.

== Other considerations ==
Gangi was appointed as the founding chairperson of the Energy Generators and Distributors Association of Uganda. The industry association, with 13 founding member organizations, was officially launched on 2 December 2020.
