= Charles Redvers Westlake =

British electrical engineer

Sir Charles Redvers Westlake (29 April 1900 – 17 February 1972) was a British electrical engineer and industrialist.

== Biography ==
Westlake was born in the hamlet of Forton in Hampshire on 29 April 1900, to Colour Sergeant Harry Westlake and his wife Elizabeth.

In 1929 Westlake became County Electrical Engineer for Dumfriesshire, and two years later Chief Engineer and Manager of the Electricity Board for Northern Ireland. From 1935 to 1948, he was an engineer at the electricity generating station (established by the Finchley Electric Light Co. and subsequently acquired by Finchley Urban District Council) at Squires Lane in Finchley, North London. During World War II he served at the War Office, and at the same time was president of the Finchley branch of the NALGO trade union.

In 1946 Westlake was appointed by the British Colonial Office to recommend a site for a hydroelectric power station in Uganda. His report, jointly produced in 1947 with the civil engineer E. V. Richards, recommended Owen Falls as the location. Westlake, as chairman of the newly formed Uganda Electricity Board, went on to direct the project (now known as the Nalubaale Hydroelectric Power Station) until its commissioning in 1954. Queen Elizabeth attended the opening of the dam and conferred a knighthood on Westlake. In 1955 he was reported as being President of the East African Association of Engineers.

Westlake retired from his post in Uganda in October 1955. In 1956 he returned to England to become chairman of Metal Industries, Limited, where he remained until 31 October 1964, leading the group from a position of heavy losses to a profitable state. He went on to become chairman of the metal window manufacturer Williams and Williams. In 1969 he became chairman of the S. W. Wood Group, a non-ferrous metal merchant

Westlake married twice: in 1929 to Winifred Lucy Luxton Western, with whom he had two daughters (Patricia and Barbara), and in 1968 to Evelyn Isabel Aistrup. He died in Lisbon in 1972 of prostate cancer.

== Bibliography ==
- Uganda Electricity Survey, 1947
