= Owen Falls =

Waterfall in Uganda

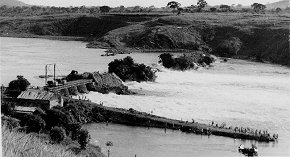
- Construction of the Owen Falls Dam Construction occurred between 1951 and 1954
- Interactive map of Owen Falls
- Location: Border of Buikwe District and Jinja District, Uganda
- Coordinates: 00°26′37″N 33°11′05″E
- Type: Cataract
- Total height: 31 m (102 ft)
- Watercourse: Nile River

The Owen Falls was a waterfall on the White Nile in Uganda near the city of Jinja. The falls, together with the nearby Ripon Falls, were submerged in 1954 with the completion of the Nalubaale Hydroelectric Power Station. The dam that houses the power station was originally named Owen Falls Dam, but was later renamed Nalubaale Dam and the name of the power station was also changed, from Owen Falls Power Station to Nalubaale Power Station.

== Location ==
The waterfalls were located approximately 4 kilometres (2 mi), north (downstream), of the point where the river leaves Lake Victoria. This is the location of Nalubaale Dam, previously called Owen Falls Dam. The geographical location of the former Owen Falls are:00°26'37.0"N, 33°11'05.0"E (Latitude:0.443611; Longitude:33.184722).

== The power station ==
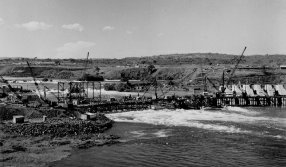
Construction of the Owen Falls Dam in early 1950s

The original Owen Falls Power Station consisted of a concrete gravity dam with a close coupled intake powerhouse unit. It controls the Lake Victoria outflows through a series of ten turbines and six sluices in the dam. When fully opened, the six sluices provide a spill capacity of about 1,200 cubic metres per second (cumecs).

At the time of its commissioning by Queen Elizabeth II, in 1954, the power station had two units of 15 megawatts each, for generation capacity of 30 megawatts. The table below illustrates how generation capacity was gradually increased until all ten units were operational in 1968. That year, generation capacity at the power station reached 150 megawatts.

History of Upgrade of Owen Falls Dam 1954 Until 1996
Rank	Year	Active Units	Unit Capacity	Total Capacity	Notes
1	1954	2	15 Megawatts	30 Megawatts	
2	1955	4	15	60	
3	1957	6	15	90	
4	1958	7	15	105	
5	1959	8	15	120	
6	1966	9	15	135	
7	1968	10	15	150	
8	1996	10	18	180	
	Total	10	18.00	180.00	

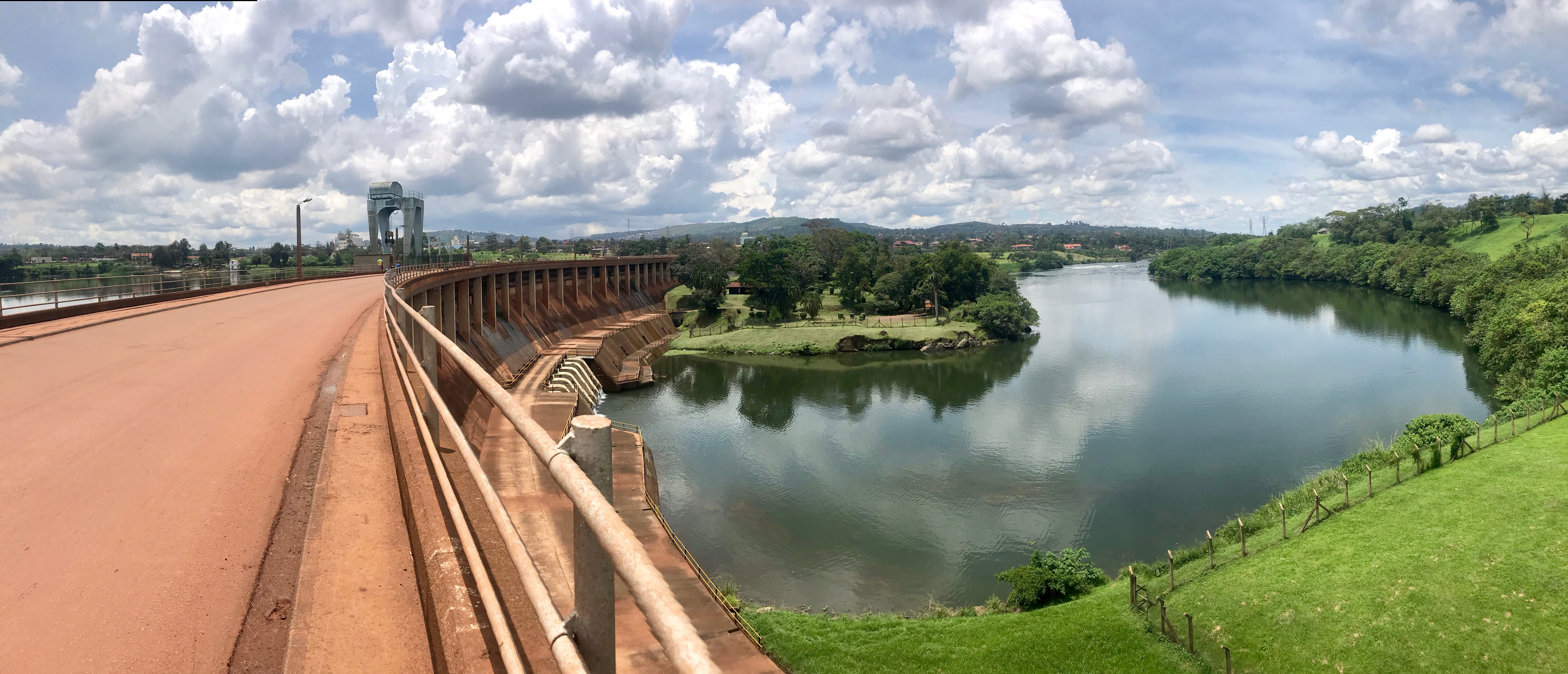
Owen Falls Dam Jinja Okt 2019 Panorama

== Operations and upgrade ==
According to agreements between the Colonial British government and the government of Egypt, signed in 1929 and amended in 1949, the power station is operated through the Agreed Curve, so that the outflow from Lake Victoria remains the same as it was before the construction of the dam; when the outflow from the lake was naturally controlled by the rocky barrier of mukkibi falls.

Due to neglect and lack of maintenance from 1971 until 1986, generation capacity at Owen Falls Dam deteriorated to 60 megawatts by 1986. This required repairs and rehabilitation, including the increase of each turbine's capacity from 15 megawatts to 18 megawatts, to meet demand. The power station's generation capacity reached 180 megawatts in 1996.

== Extension ==
The feasibility of increasing the power generating capacity of the Nile River at this location, was studied at the end of the 1980s by Acres International, which today is part of Hatch Ltd of Canada. The new project is a second powerhouse located about 1 kilometre (1 mi) northeast of the Nalubaale Power Station. A new canal was cut to bring water from Lake Victoria to the new powerhouse. Major construction was completed in 1999. The first power from two units out of the installed five units, came online in 2000. The fifth and final turbine was installed in 2007. Each turbine has a capacity of 40 megawatts. The new power station is called Kiira Hydroelectric Power Station.

== See also ==
- List of power stations in Uganda
