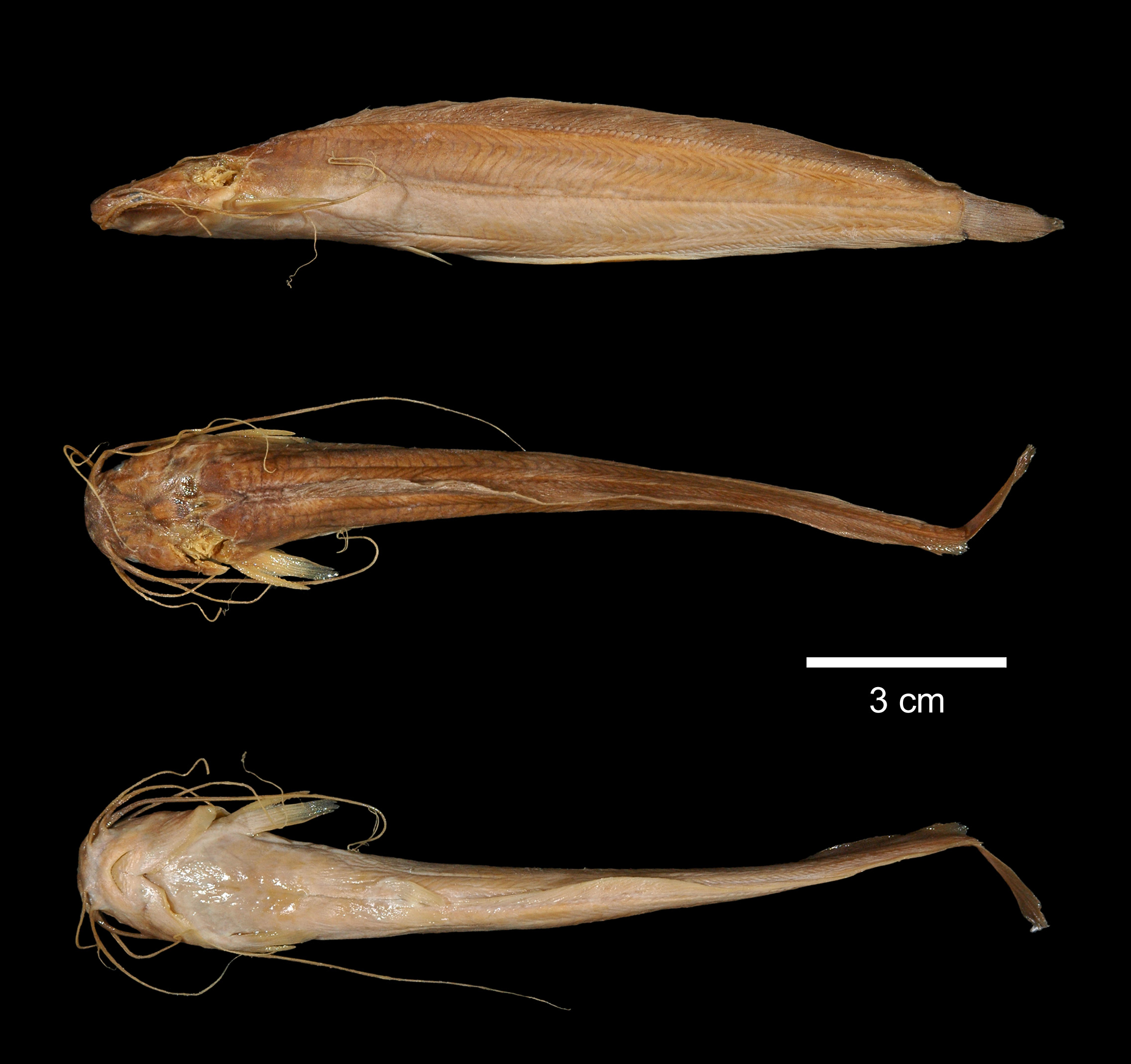

Conservation status
- Critically endangered, possibly extinct (IUCN 3.1)

Scientific classification
- Kingdom: Animalia
- Phylum: Chordata
- Class: Actinopterygii
- Order: Siluriformes
- Family: Clariidae
- Genus: Xenoclarias; Greenwood, 1958
- Species: X. eupogon

Binomial name
- Xenoclarias eupogon (Norman, 1928)
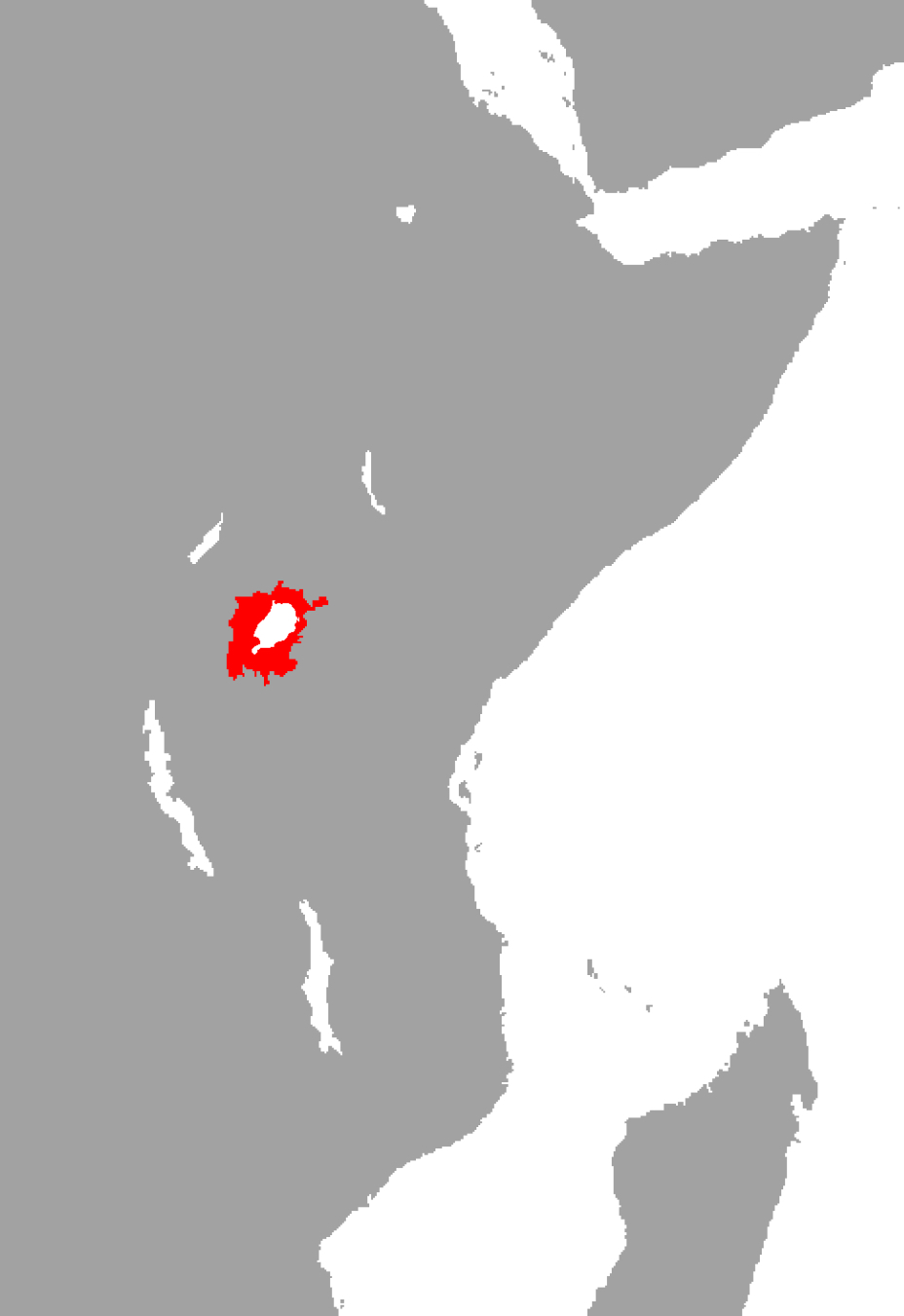

= Lake Victoria deepwater catfish =

Species of fish

The Lake Victoria deepwater catfish (Xenoclarias eupogon) is a species of catfish (order Siluriformes) of the family Clariidae. This species is endemic to Lake Victoria, and is found in deeper areas of the lake, from 12 to 20 metres (39–66 ft). This species is threatened with extinction or may already be extinct due to predation by the introduced Nile perch as well as other recent ecological changes. This species grows to about 20 cm (7.9 in) SL.
