= Ernest Cox =

British engineer (1883–1959)

Ernest Frank Guelph Cox (1883–1959) was a British engineer, with knowledge in electrical and mechanical engineering, which he notably deployed in marine salvage. Between 1924 and 1931 his Cox & Danks Shipbreaking Co. successfully raised 35 ships of the German Imperial Navy High Seas Fleet that had been scuttled at Gutter Sound, Scapa Flow, in 1919. A tough but caring employer, after a series of fatalities and accidents to his employees, Cox sold his marine salvaging business to the Alloa Shipbreaking Company in 1932. He remained a consultant to the British Admiralty throughout his remaining career, and retired in the early 1950s after selling his profitable scrap metal business to Metal Industries.

== Early life ==
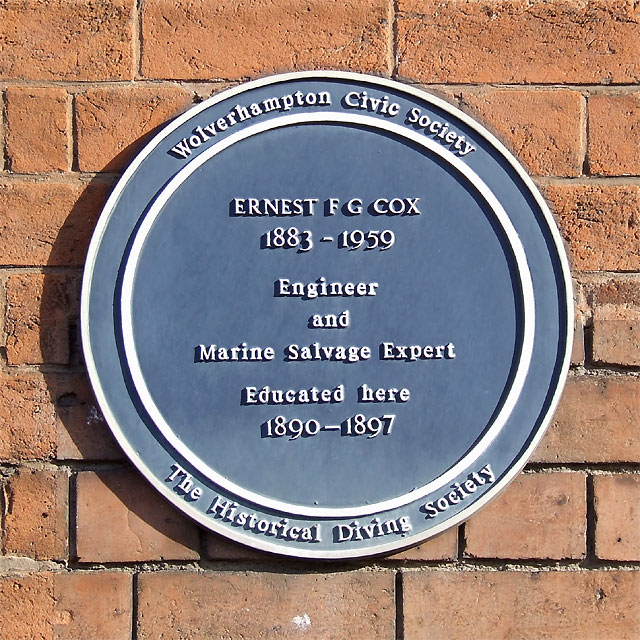
Blue plaque

Born in 1883, the eleventh son of a Wolverhampton draper, Cox left school at thirteen but chose to study electrical engineering in his spare time, and through a succession of jobs, earned himself the post of Engineer at a Wolverhampton power station by the age of eighteen. Deciding that anyone who could put electricity into people's homes would become rich, Cox was determined to be just that, and moved to the post of Assistant Engineer at Leamington, and from there to Ryde Corporation on the Isle of Wight. In doing so he learned the art of salesmanship, selling electrical power installation to the inhabitants of Ryde.

== Early career ==
From Ryde he moved to Hamilton, Scotland at the age of twenty-three, a change of position that taught him the rudiments of management. Moving yet again, this time to Wishaw in Lanarkshire, he took what was to be his last salaried job, laying down plant and network as Chief Engineer, aged just twenty-four. It was here in 1907 that Cox married the daughter of Wishaw Councillor Miller, the owner of Overton Forge, a Lanarkshire steelworks, and joined the firm as a partner. Unable to leave his post at the power station, he carried out both jobs simultaneously.

== Cox and Danks ==
In 1913 he set up the firm of Cox and Danks Ltd, with his wife's cousin Tommy Danks as a silent partner and financier. Cox's need for capital was met by Danks, who sought a way to increase his inheritance without personal involvement in business.

The firm was well positioned to profit from large munitions manufacturing contracts during World War I. The end of hostilities opened new and lucrative opportunities in scrap and metal salvage, enabling Cox to open new business in Sheffield, and buy out his partner Danks' interests by 1920. In 1921 Cox had branched out into shipbreaking and opened a yard at Queenborough on the Isle of Sheppey, on the River Thames estuary. There the company broke up and sold off an assortment of World War I surplus vessels, including two British battleships HMS Erin and HMS Orion and some ex-German naval items including a large floating dock taken as reparation following the scuttling of the German High Seas Fleet prior to the Armistice.

Fatal accidents on the wreck of the White Star liner Celtic (stranded on the Cow and Calf rocks, adjacent to Roches Point, off Cobh, Ireland in 1929), took some of the drive out of Cox, for he respected his workers and treated them accordingly. In Cox's opinion money could always be replaced, but good men could not. Resultantly, during 1932 he sold the company's marine salvaging business to Alloa Shipbreaking, and retired himself from marine salvage. Cox remained a consultant to the British Admiralty on matters of deep water salvage, and undertook their side of the work in the raising in 1932 of the old battleship HMS Emperor of India, contracted to the Alloa Shipbreaking, which the Admiralty had used as a target ship and sunk by mistake.

Foreseeing the possibilities of another war in Europe in the late 1930s, Cox expanded the scrap metals business by opening yards in: Bedford; Birmingham; London (Brentford, Feltham and Park Royal); Manchester; and Neath (South Wales). During World War II he undertook research and development for classified materials for the Ministry of Supply. Cox's last salvage task was during WW2, raising of the ship Stella, which, having been bombed by the Luftwaffe, had then sunk in and thereby blocked the Manchester Ship Canal. Again, Cox and Danks flourished as the war ended, disposing of military surplus and salvage.

In 1949, Cox sold the firm to Metal Industries Group, who by now owned Alloa Shipbreaking. Though the salvage side of the business never quite broke even, especially during the course of the salvage of the German fleet (he was ten thousand pounds out of pocket at the sale of his interests), the scrap metal side business offset the loss by turning considerable profit, ensuring that when he retired he and his family no longer needed to work.

Cox & Danks Ltd did well during the post-Beeching Axe era in the early 1960s, tendering for contracts to scrap surplus railway locomotives, rolling stock and associated equipment for British Railways. The majority of the GWR King Class locomotives were withdrawn late in 1962, with ten allocated to Cox and Danks for disposal. On 1 April 1970 the company, by then part of the Metal Industries wing of Thorn Electrical Industries, became a subsidiary of the Six Hundred Metal Holdings group owned by George Cohen's "600" Group.

== German High Seas Fleet ==
Lacking work, by 1924 he turned his attention to the wreckage of the High Seas Fleet, scuttled at its moorings in the natural harbour of Scapa Flow in Orkney, off the North-east coast of Scotland in late June 1919. Though initially written off by the British Admiralty as unsalvageable, the recent rises in the price of scrap metal had changed the value of the wrecks to the extent that they would now be profitable to lift, based on Cox's estimates of the quantity of high quality Krupp steel armour alone, before taking into account non-ferrous salvage.

Ignoring expert opinion, his initial investment was to buy from the Admiralty the rights to salvage two battlecruisers – SMS Hindenburg and SMS Seydlitz – and twenty six destroyers. The two heavy ships were both accessible from the surface; Seydlitz was often mistaken for a small island as her port flank stuck perhaps six metres out of the water, and Hindenburg was upright with her decks awash. Cox's idea was to raise the Hindenburg and use its twenty-six thousand ton hull as a floating platform from which to enable salvage of the other ships. This was ultimately to prove impractical, as several attempts to lift the Hindenburg ended in failure, due to the hulk's instability and the likelihood of its capsizing whilst being pumped out, as it was sitting on rock and not shingle as had been first supposed.

He took his reparation ex-German floating dock, once used for U-Boat testing and sectioned it lengthwise to salvage the first of his destroyers, which was then cleaned and converted into a floating workshop. His team was composed of local labour supporting a core of hired divers and skilled salvage men from all over Scotland; after some practice they were raising a destroyer every four to six weeks, with the fastest lift being accomplished in just four days. Heartened by this, Cox bought the rights to the remainder of the sunken fleet, and proceeded to lift the battlecruiser SMS Moltke which was upside down in shallow water with her keel at the surface at low tide. Adapting the advice of Italian salvage experts who had raised an upside down ship from the bottom of Taranto Harbour, Cox raised the ship inverted by filling it with air. It was then lightened and towed to Rosyth on the Firth of Forth for scrapping, Cox having sold the hulk to the Alloa Shipbreaking Company for its weight in scrap. This basic technique would be used repeatedly on many ships of the fleet. Divers would descend to each wreck and perform work such as closing and dogging bulkhead hatches and fastening timber backed plate-steel patches over holes. Then air would be pumped in from air compressors at the surface. In some cases where the hulls themselves could not be made close enough to air-tight, pontoons were used, similarly being filled with air, and ballast was sunk alongside the sunken ships and then secured to them to counterbalance them for lifting.

It was during this stage of the project that his venture suffered a severe blow; the price of scrap metal collapsed, finally stabilising at a quarter of its previous value. Whilst sufficient profit remained to ensure a chance of breaking even, the sunken fleet no longer represented the cash rich harvest that it once had. Indeed, the price of scrap remained depressed until 1937, well after Cox had effectively retired from salvage.

A plain spoken and often blunt man, Cox was known for his explosive temper; he was respected by his workers as being brilliant, hard working and stubborn to the point of pig-headedness. He did not spare either his workers or himself during the eight years he remained at Scapa Flow. He kept his business afloat by common sense and good judgement, such as the salvage of coal from the wreck of the Seydlitz to provide fuel for his machinery during the General Strike of 1926. This was balanced by acts of ego, such as the re-sinking of the Seydlitz after it had been successfully lifted early, as he had arranged for the press to be present on the day that it had been scheduled to be raised. Considered a 'showman' by his contemporaries, Cox was happy to allow the recording of some of the works in progress at Lyness on the Island of Hoy by reporters and photographers, including film shot for newsreel. Some of these can still be found on YouTube; Cox is visible in most of them, an active figure, incongruously dressed in tweeds.

By May 1932, Cox had raised the battlecruisers SMS Moltke, SMS Seydlitz, SMS Von der Tann, and SMS Hindenburg; the battleships SMS Kaiser and SMS Prinzregent Luitpold, and the light cruiser SMS Bremse.

After personally witnessing fatal accidents on the wreck of the White Star liner Celtic, and additional accidents whilst raising the Von der Tann and fatalities on the Prinzregent Luitpold, during 1932 Cox sold the marine salvaging side of his business to Alloa Shipbreaking, and retired from marine salvage. The Prinzregent Luitpold was the last ship that he raised in Orkney, despite having bought the rights to salvage SMS Bayern, sunk at Scapa in 20 fathoms.

Cox remained a consultant to the British Admiralty on matters of deep water salvage, and undertook their side of the work in the raising in 1932 of the old battleship HMS Emperor of India, contracted to the Alloa Shipbreaking, which the Admiralty had used as a target ship and sunk by mistake.

Cox was frequently assumed to be a poor businessman who did not understand business efficiency, and admitted to being inexperienced in the difficulties of ship raising. But he also suffered from an astonishing amount of bad luck during his eight years at Scapa Flow. Accidents that were as much the fault of the elements as of human error had plagued the salvage. An imaginative man, he learned quickly, overcoming the frequently appalling weather to which the area is prone, which when coupled to the fact that no two lifts are ever the same may have dissuaded or broken a lesser man. The rise and fall of the price of scrap frequently ate up the best of his profits during the long salvage operation. The major slump in the price of scrap during 1924 was only really reversed by 1937, in time for his successors Alloa Shipbreaking to capitalise on their investment (the hull of the SMS Friedrich der Grosse alone was valued at £130,000 following salvage that year). Despite all this, he was considered a fair, if firm, and above all popular employer. His yard at Lyness on the Orkney Island of Hoy employed 200 workers at the peak of his business, and he was noted for granting holidays with pay during times of financial hardship.

== Later life ==
After selling his business, Cox spent the remainder of his days supporting charities, and giving lectures on deepwater salvage, including the High Seas Fleet.

In failing health, Ernest Cox died in 1959 at the age of seventy-six.

== Bibliography ==
- Gores, Joseph N (1971). Marine Salvage: The Unforgiving Business of No Cure, No Pay. Preface by Willard Bascom. Garden City, NY, USA: Doubleday. OCLC 136301.
