= Lake Victoria =

Lake in East-central Africa

- Ziwa Ukerewe (Swahili); 'Nnalubaale (Luganda); Nyanza (Kinyarwanda); Nam Lolwe (Dholuo)
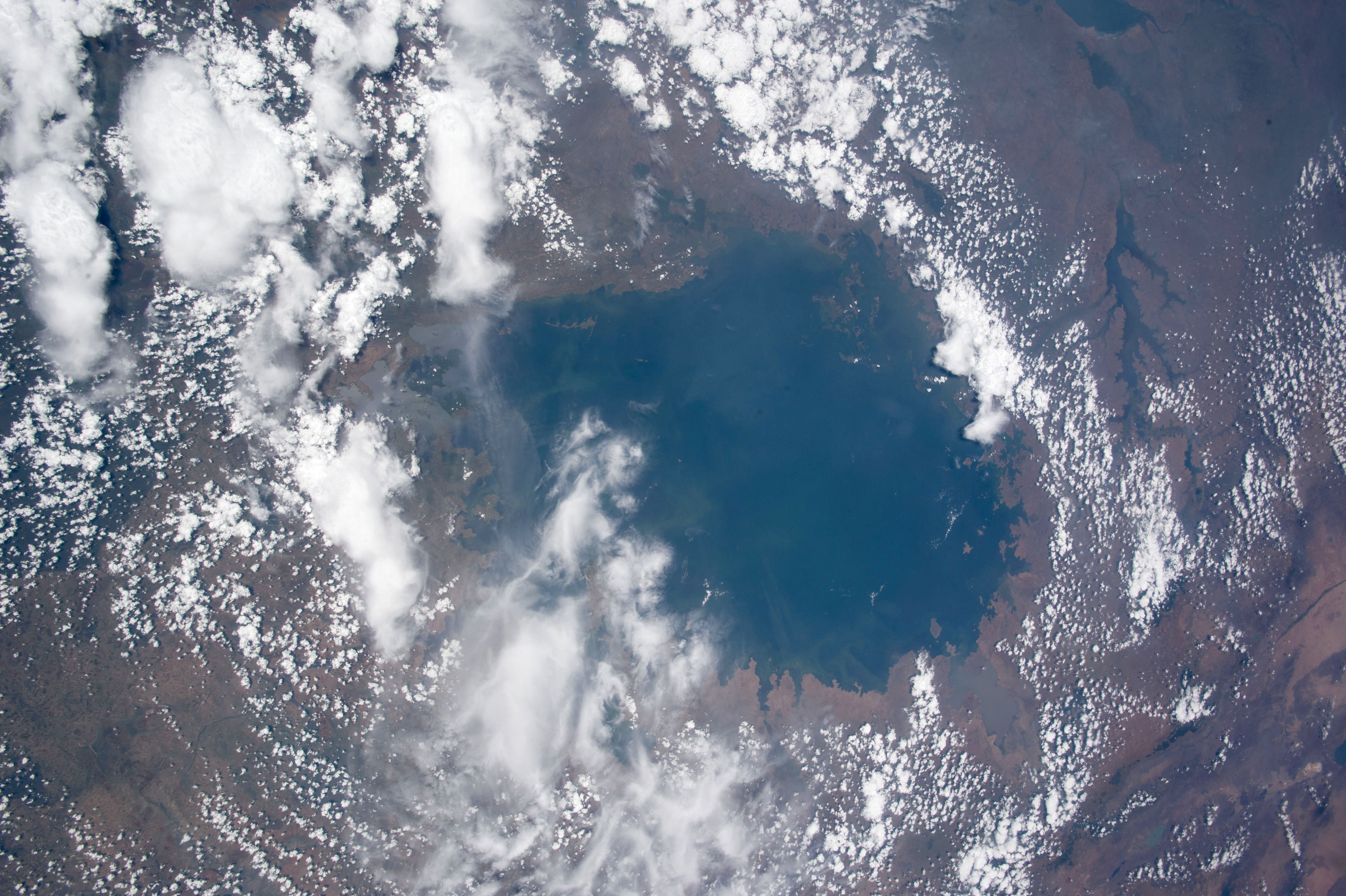
- Lake Victoria partially obscured by clouds, as seen from the International Space Station

- Location within Africa
- Location: African Great Lakes
- Coordinates: 1°S 33°E
- Primary inflows: Kagera River
- Primary outflows: White Nile
- Catchment area: 169,858 km^{2} (65,583 sq mi); 229,815 km^{2} (88,732 sq mi) basin
- Basin countries: Burundi, Kenya, Rwanda, Tanzania, and Uganda
- Max. length: 359 km (223 mi)
- Max. width: 337 km (209 mi)
- Surface area: 59,947 km^{2} (23,146 sq mi)
- Average depth: 40.4 m (133 ft)
- Max. depth: 81 m (266 ft)
- Water volume: 2,424 km^{3} (582 mi^{3})
- Shore length^{1}: 7,142 km (4,438 mi)
- Surface elevation: 1,135 m (3,724 ft)
- Islands: 985 (Ukerewe Island, Tanzania; Ssese Islands, Uganda; Maboko Island, Kenya)
- Settlements: Bukoba, Tanzania; Mwanza, Tanzania; Musoma, Tanzania; Kisumu, Kenya; Kendu Bay, Kenya; Homa Bay, Kenya; Kampala, Uganda; Entebbe, Uganda; Jinja, Uganda
- ^{1} Shore length is not a well-defined measure.

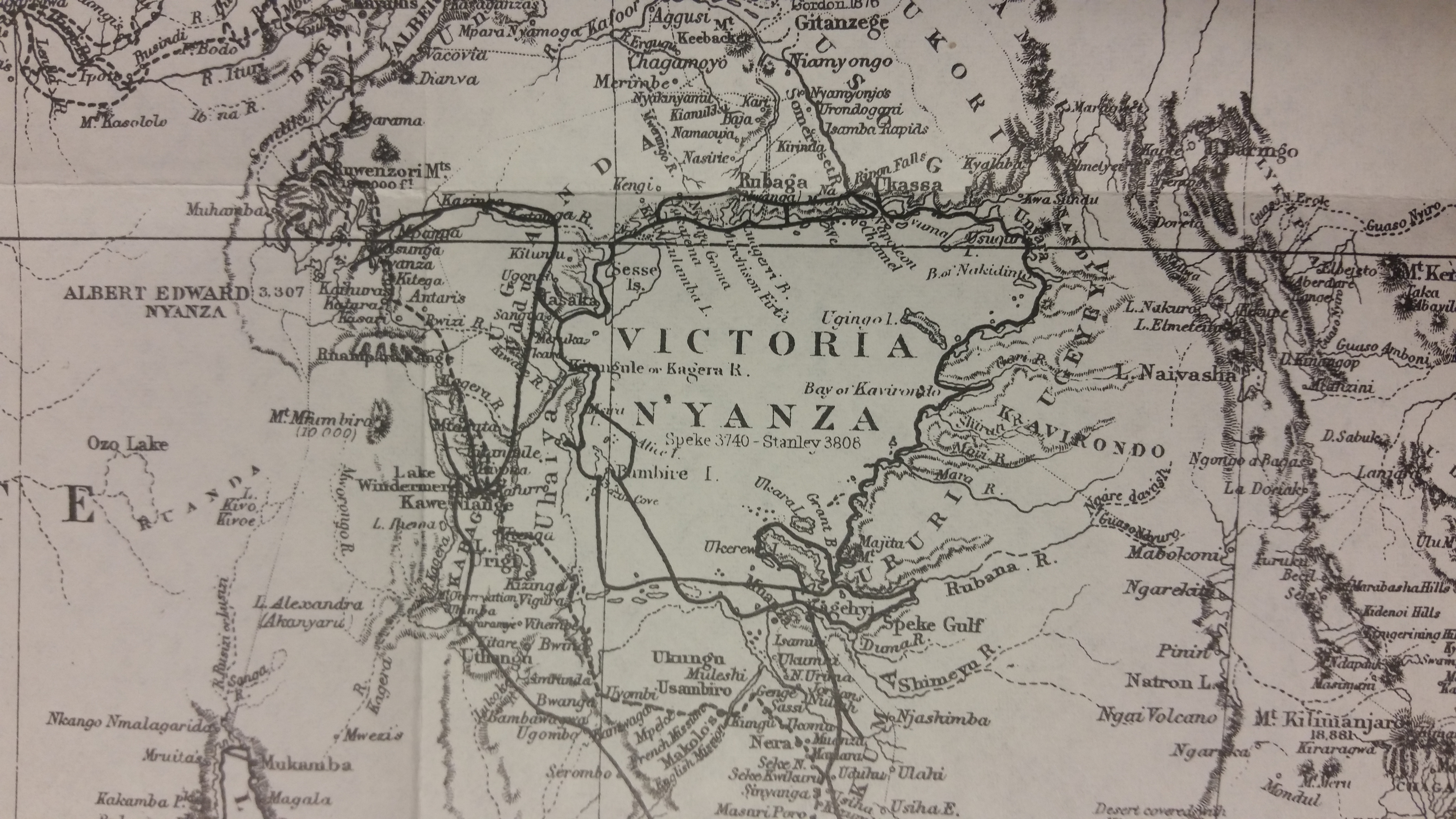
Victoria Nyanza. The black line indicates Stanley's route.

Lake Victoria is one of the African Great Lakes. With a surface area of approximately 59,947 km^{2} (23,146 sq mi), Lake Victoria is Africa's largest lake by area, the world's largest tropical lake, and the world's second-largest fresh water lake by surface area after Lake Superior in North America. In terms of volume, Lake Victoria is the world's ninth-largest continental lake, containing about 2,424 km^{3} (1.965×10^{9} acre⋅ft) of water. Lake Victoria occupies a shallow depression in Africa. The lake has an average depth of 40 m (130 ft) and a maximum depth of 80–81 m (262–266 ft). Its catchment area covers 169,858 km^{2} (65,583 sq mi). The lake has a shoreline of 7,142 km (4,438 mi) when digitized at the 1:25,000 level, with islands constituting 3.7% of this length.

The lake's area is divided among three countries: Tanzania occupies 49% (33,700 km^{2} (13,000 sq mi)), Uganda 45% (31,000 km^{2} (12,000 sq mi)), and Kenya 6% (4,100 km^{2} (1,600 sq mi)).

The lake is home to many species of fish which live nowhere else, especially cichlids. Invasive fish, such as the Nile perch, have driven many endemic species to extinction.

== Names ==
Though having multiple local language names (Swahili: Ziwa Nyanza; Dholuo: Nam Lolwe; Luganda: 'Nnalubaale; Kinyarwanda: Nyanza; Luhya: Nyanza / Inyancha), the lake was renamed after Queen Victoria by the explorer John Hanning Speke, the first Briton to document it in 1858, while on an expedition with Richard Francis Burton.

== Geology ==
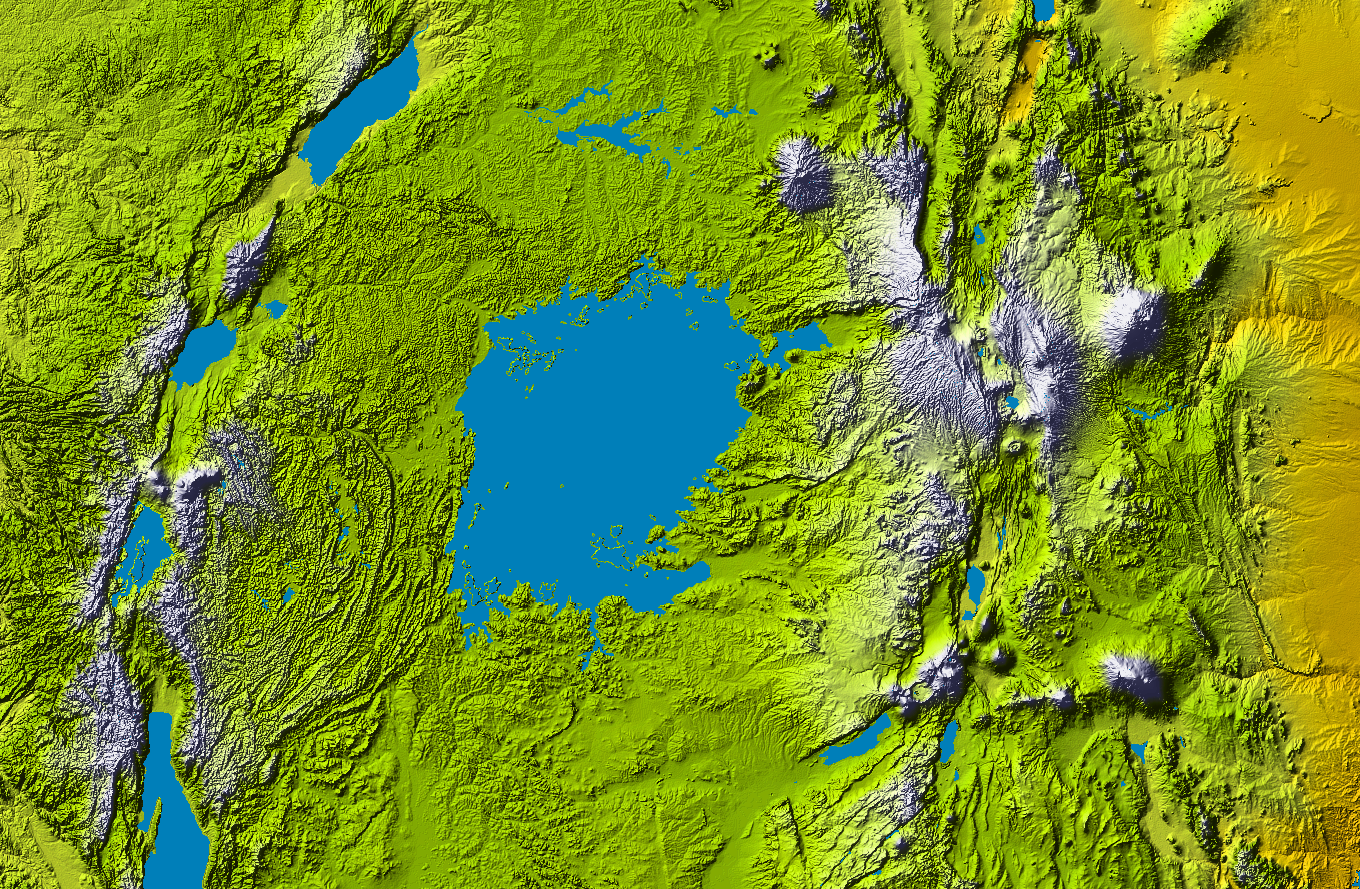
Topographical map of Lake Victoria

Photojournalist John Reader, writing in his Alan Paton Literary Award-winning Africa: A Biography of a Continent, describes Lake Victoria as being relatively geologically young at about 400,000 years old—having been formed as westward-flowing rivers were backed up "when a fractured block of the Earth's crust tilted along the line of the Great Rift Valley, raising its western edge". A primary study, attempting "fluvial differentiation of the basin of Lake Victoria", draws several relevant tentative conclusions. First, during the Miocene era, what is now the catchment area of the lake was on the western side of an uplifted area that functioned as a continental divide, with streams on the western side flowing into the Congo River basin and streams on the eastern side flowing to the Indian Ocean. Second, as the East African Rift System formed, the eastern wall of the Albertine Rift (or Western Rift) rose gradually reversing the drainage towards what is now Lake Victoria. Third, the opening of the main East African Rift and the Albertine Rift downwarped the area between them as the rift walls rose, creating the current Lake Victoria basin.

During its geological history, Lake Victoria went through changes ranging from its present shallow depression, through to what may have been a series of much smaller lakes. Geological cores taken from its bottom show Lake Victoria has dried up completely at least three times since it formed. These drying cycles are probably related to past ice ages, which were times when precipitation declined globally. According to another primary source, Lake Victoria last dried out about 17,300 years ago, and it refilled 14,700 years ago—as the African humid period began.

== Hydrology and limnology ==
Lake Victoria receives 80 percent of its water from direct rainfall. Average evaporation on the lake is between 2.0 and 2.2 metres (6 ft 7 in and 7 ft 3 in) per year, almost double the precipitation of riparian areas. Lake Victoria receives its water additionally from rivers, and thousands of small streams. The Kagera River is the largest river flowing into this lake, with its mouth on the lake's western shore. Lake Victoria is drained solely by the Nile River near Jinja, Uganda, on the lake's northern shore.

Lake Victoria and the Great Rift Valley

In the Kenya sector, the main influent rivers are the Sio, Nzoia, Yala, Nyando, Sondu Miriu, Mogusi, and Migori. The only outflow from Lake Victoria is the Nile River, which exits the lake near Jinja, Uganda. In terms of contributed water, this makes Lake Victoria the principal source of the longest branch of the Nile. However, the most distal source of the Nile Basin, and therefore the ultimate source of the Nile, is more often considered to be one of the tributary rivers of the Kagera River (the exact tributary remains undetermined), and which originates in either Rwanda or Burundi. The uppermost section of the Nile is generally known as the Victoria Nile until it reaches Lake Albert. Although it is a part of the same river system known as the White Nile and is occasionally referred to as such, strictly speaking this name does not apply until after the river crosses the Uganda border into South Sudan to the north.

The lake exhibits eutrophic conditions. In 1990–1991, oxygen concentrations in the mixed layer were higher than in 1960–1961, with nearly continuous oxygen super saturation in surface waters. Oxygen concentrations in hypolimnetic waters (i.e., the layer of water that lies below the thermocline, is non-circulating, and remains perpetually cold) were lower in 1990–1991 for a longer period than in 1960–1961, with values of less than 1 mg per litre (< 0.4 g/ft³)occurring in water as shallow as 40 metres (130 ft) compared with a shallowest occurrence of greater than 50 metres (160 ft) in 1961. The changes in oxygenation are considered consistent with measurements of higher algal biomass and productivity. These changes have arisen for multiple reasons: successive burning within its basin, soot and ash from which has been deposited over the lake's wide area; from increased nutrient inflows via rivers, and from increased pollution associated with settlement along its shores.

Between 2010 and 2022, the surface area of Lake Victoria increased by 15% flooding lakeside communities.

== Bathymetry ==
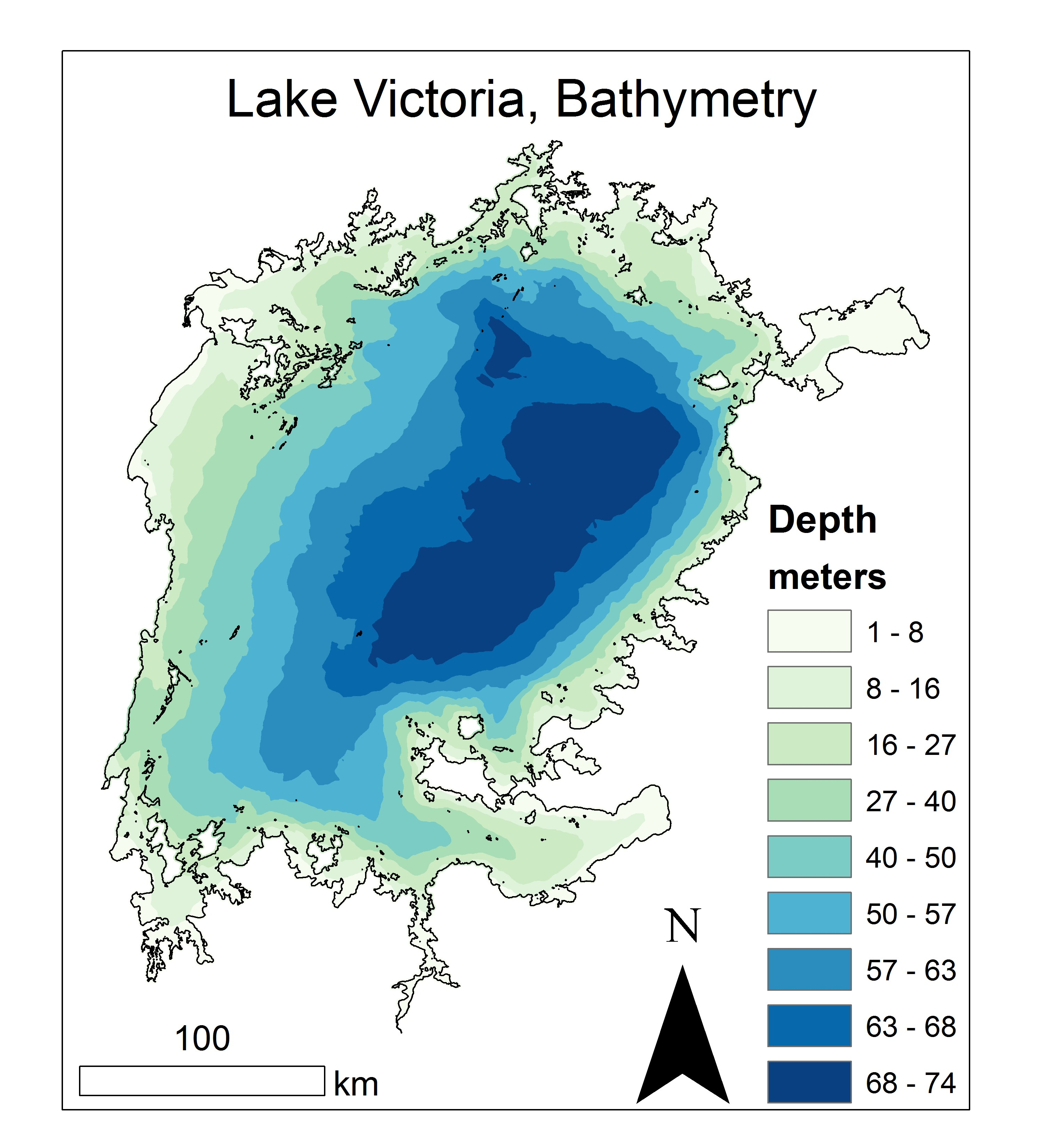
Lake Victoria bathymetric model

The lake is a shallow lake considering its large geographic area with a maximum depth of approximately 80 metres (260 ft) and an average depth of 40 metres (130 ft). A 2016 project digitized ten-thousand points and created the first true bathymetric map of the lake. The deepest part of the lake is offset to the east of the lake near Kenya and the lake is generally shallower in the west along the Ugandan shoreline and the south along the Tanzanian shoreline.

== Native wildlife ==
=== Mammals ===
Many mammal species live in the region of Lake Victoria, and some of these are closely associated with the lake itself and the nearby wetlands. Among these are the hippopotamus, African clawless otter, spotted-necked otter, marsh mongoose, sitatunga, bohor reedbuck, defassa waterbuck, cane rats, and giant otter shrew.

=== Reptiles ===
Lake Victoria and its wetlands has a large population of Nile crocodiles, as well as African helmeted turtles, variable mud turtles, and Williams' mud turtle. The Williams' mud turtle is restricted to Lake Victoria and other lakes, rivers, and swamps in the upper Nile basin.

=== Cichlid fish ===
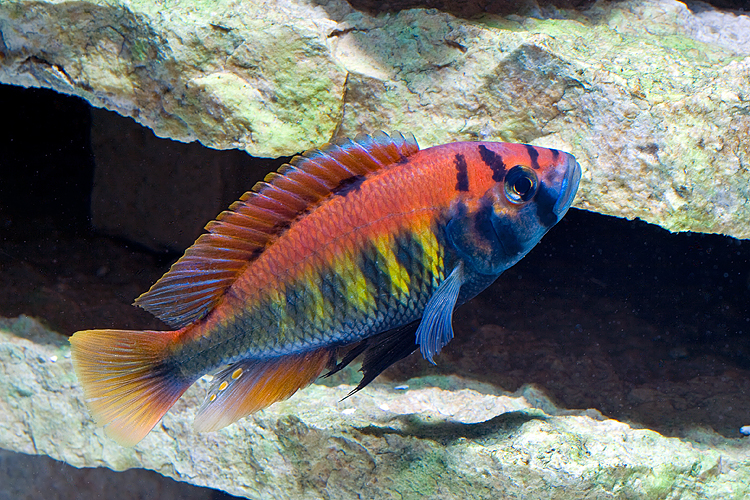
Unlike many other Lake Victoria cichlids, Haplochromis nyererei remains common. Compared to several other cichlids, its eyes are particularly sensitive to light, especially red, which is less affected by the decrease in water clarity caused by eutrophication than short wavelength colors

Lake Victoria formerly was very rich in fish, including many endemics, but a high percentage of these became extinct since the 1940s. The main group in Lake Victoria is the haplochromine cichlids (Haplochromis sensu lato) with more than 500 species, almost all endemic, and including an estimated 300 that still are undescribed. This is far more species of fish than any other lake in the world, except Lake Malawi. These are the result of a rapid adaptive radiation in the last circa 15,000 years. Their extraordinary diversity and speed of evolution have been the subjects for many scientists studying the forces that drive the richness of life everywhere. The Victoria haplochromines are part of an older group of more than 700 closely related species, also including those of several smaller lakes in the region, notably Kyoga, Edward–George, Albert, and Kivu.

Most of these lakes are relatively shallow (like Victoria) and part of the present-day upper Nile basin. The exception is Lake Kivu, which is part of the present-day Congo River basin, but is believed to have been connected to Lakes Edward and Victoria by rivers until the uplifting of parts of the East African Rift. This deep lake may have functioned as an "evolutionary reservoir" for this haplochromine group in periods where other shallower lakes in the region dried out, as happened to Lake Victoria about 15,000 years ago. In recent history only Lake Kyoga was easily accessible to Victoria cichlids, as further downstream movement by the Victoria Nile (to Lake Albert) is prevented by a series of waterfalls, notably Murchison. In contrast, the Owen Falls (now flooded by a dam) between Victoria and Kyoga were essentially a series of rapids that did not effectively block fish movements between the two lakes.

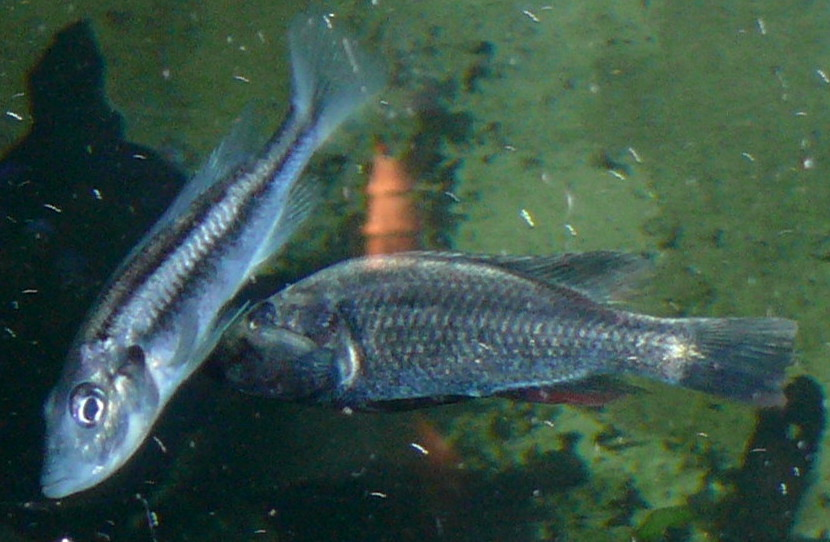
Haplochromis thereuterion survives in low numbers. Initially feared extinct, when rediscovered it had changed habitat (from near surface to rocky outcrops) and feeding behavior (from surface insects to insect larvae)

The Victoria haplochromines are distinctly sexually dimorphic (males relatively brightly colored; females dull), and their ecology is extremely diverse, falling into at least 16 groups, including detritivores, zooplanktivores, insectivores, prawn-eaters, molluscivores and piscivores. As a result of predation by the introduced Nile perch, eutrophication and other changes to the ecosystem, it is estimated that at least 200 species (about 40 percent) of Lake Victoria haplochromines have become extinct, including more than 100 undescribed species. Initially it was feared that this number was even higher, by some estimates 65 percent of the total species, but several species that were feared extinct have been rediscovered after the Nile perch started to decline in the 1990s. Several of the remaining species are seriously threatened and additional extinctions are possible. Some species have survived in nearby small satellite lakes, have survived in refugias among rocks or papyrus sedges (protecting them from the Nile perch), or have adapted to the human-induced changes in the lake itself. Such adaptions include a larger gill area (adaption for oxygen-poor water), changes in the feeding apparatus, changes to the eyes (giving them better sight in turbid water) and smaller head/larger caudal peduncle (allowing faster swimming). The piscivorous (affected by both predation and competition from Nile perch), molluscivorous and insectivorous haplochromines were particularly hard hit with many extinctions. Others have become extinct in their pure form, but survive as hybrids between close relatives (especially among the detritivores). The zooplanktivores have been least affected and in the late 1990s had reached densities similar to, or above, the densities before the drastic declines, although consisting of fewer species and often switching their diet towards macroinvertebrates. Some of the threatened Lake Victoria cichlid species have captive "insurance" populations in zoos, public aquaria and among private aquarists, and a few species are extinct in the wild (only survive in captivity).

Before the mass extinction that has occurred among the lake's cichlids in the last 50 years, about 90 percent of the native fish species in the lake were haplochromines. Disregarding the haplochromines, the only native Victoria cichlids are two critically endangered tilapia, the Singida tilapia or ngege (Oreochromis esculentus) and Victoria tilapia (O. variabilis).

In 1927–1928 Michael Graham conducted the first ever systematic Fisheries Survey of Lake Victoria. In his official report of the expedition, Graham wrote that "The ngege or satu Tilapia esculenta, is the most important food fish of the lake, whether for native or non-native consumption. No other fish equals it in the quality of the flesh. It is convenient size for trade, travels well and is found in much greater numbers than other important fish, such as semutundu (Luganda), Bagrus sp.". Furthermore, Graham noted that the introduction of the European flax gill net of 5 inch mesh had undoubtedly caused a diminution in the number of ngege in those parts of the Kavirondo Gulf, the northern shore of the lake, the Sesse Islands and Smith's Sound which are conveniently situated close to markets. Survey catches in 1927–28 included several Haplochromis species that are now thought to be extinct, including: Haplochromis flavipinnis, Haplochromis gowersii, Haplochromis longirostris, Haplochromis macrognathus, Haplochromis michaeli, Haplochromis nigrescens, Haplochromis prognathus.

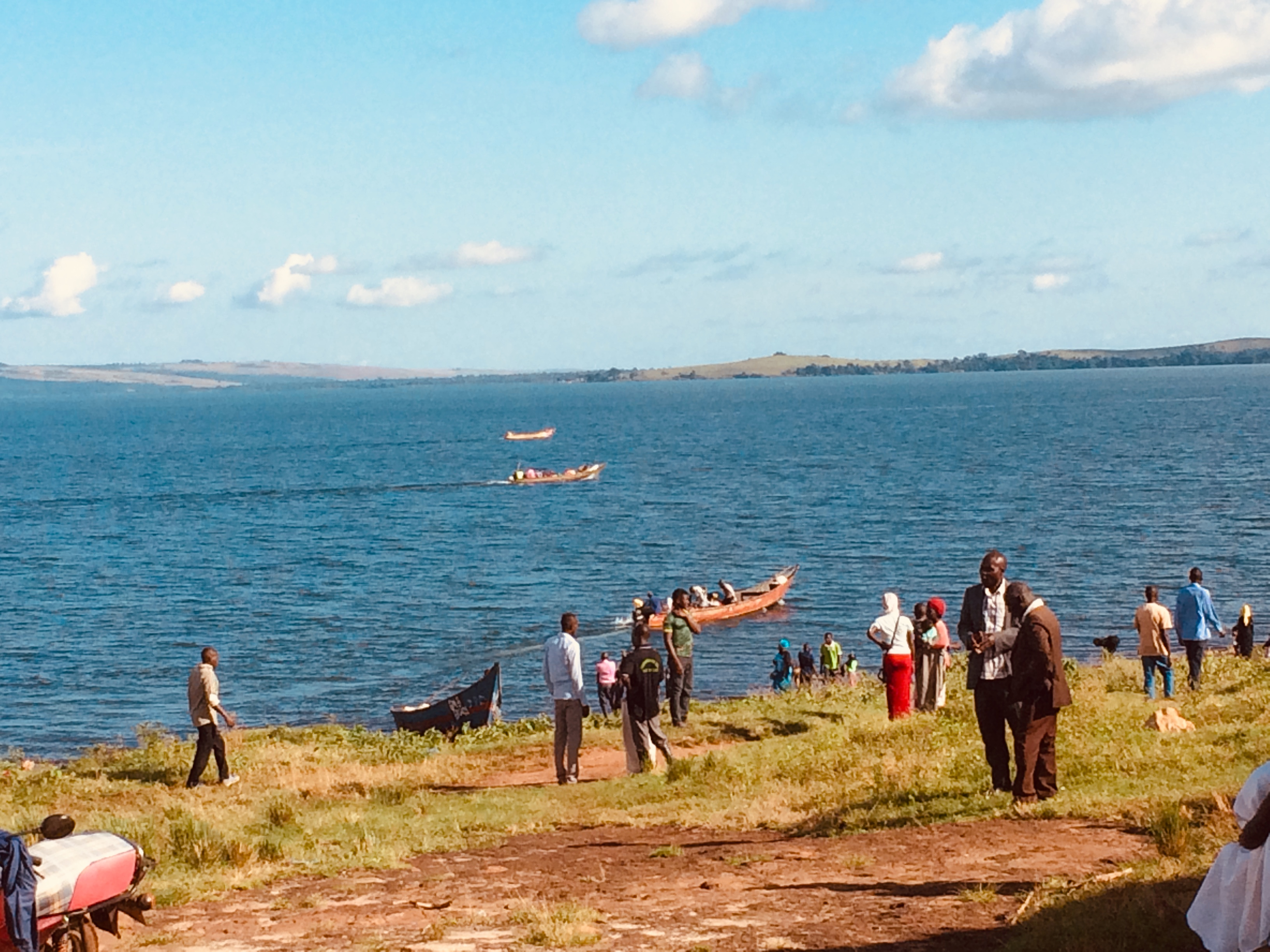
View at Lake Victoria in Uganda

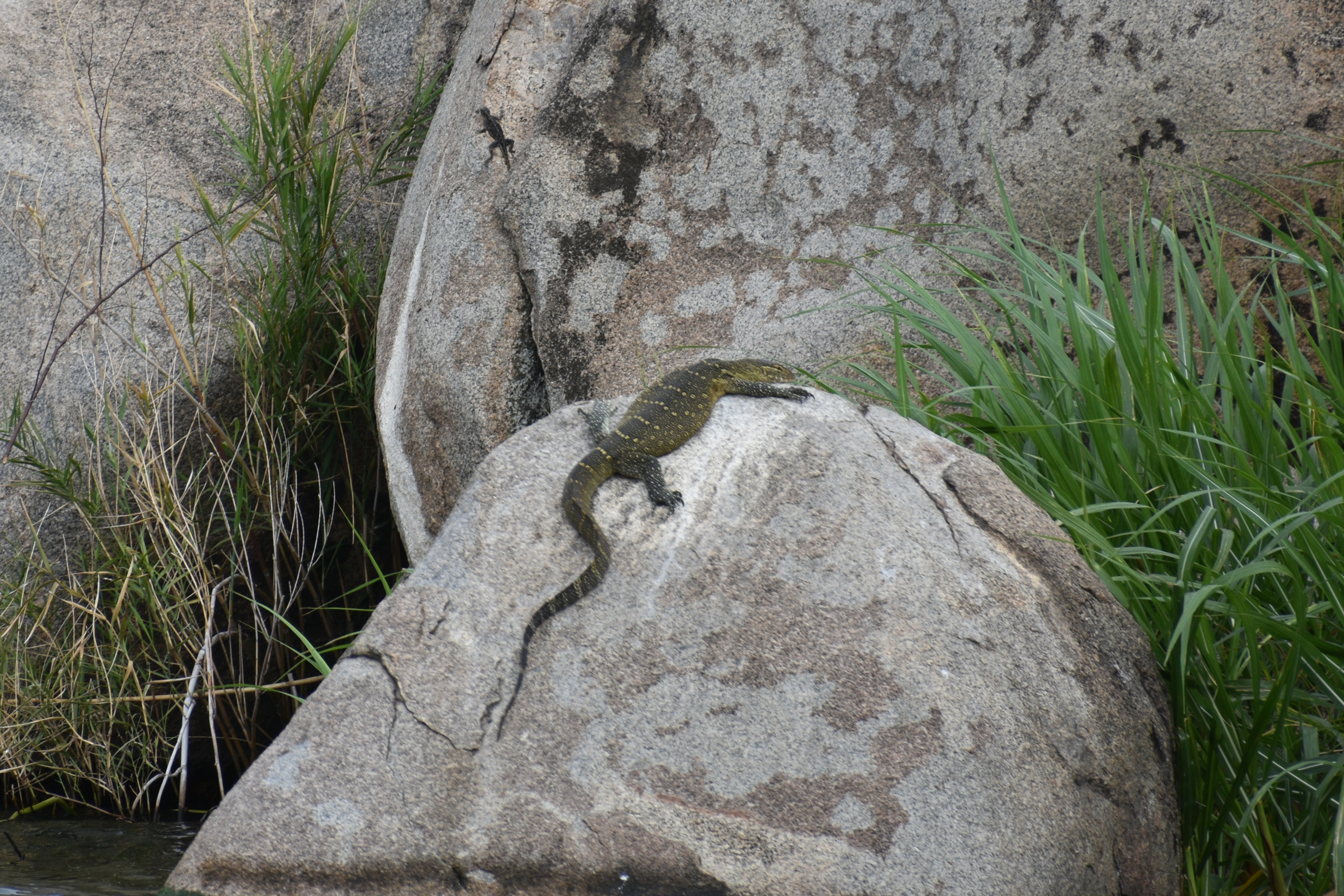
Nile monitor lizard, Lake Victoria.

As well as being due to the introduction of Nile perch, the extinction of cichlids in the genus Haplochromis has also been blamed on the lake's eutrophication. The fertility of tropical waters depends on the rate at which nutrients can be brought into solution. The influent rivers of Lake Victoria provide few nutrients to the lake in relation to its size. Because of this, most of Lake Victoria's nutrients are thought to be locked up in lake-bottom deposits. By itself, this vegetative matter decays slowly. Animal flesh decays considerably faster, however, so the fertility of the lake is dependent on the rate at which these nutrients can be taken up by fish and other organisms. There is little doubt that Haplochromis played an important role in returning detritus and plankton back into solution. With some 80 percent of Haplochromis species feeding off detritus, and equally capable of feeding off one another, they represented a tight, internal recycling system, moving nutrients and biomass both vertically and horizontally through the water column, and even out of the lake via predation by humans and terrestrial animals. The removal of Haplochromis, however, may have contributed to the increasing frequency of algal blooms, which may in turn be responsible for mass fish kills.

=== Other fish ===
The non-cichlid native fish include African tetras (Brycinus), cyprinids (Enteromius, Garra, Labeo, Labeobarbus, Rastrineobola and Xenobarbus), airbreathing catfish (Clariallabes, Clarias and Xenoclarias), bagrid catfish (Bagrus), loach catfish (Amphilius and Zaireichthys), silver butter catfish (Schilbe intermedius), Synodontis squeaker catfish, Nothobranchius killifish, poeciliids (Aplocheilichthys and Micropanchax), the spiny eel Mastacembelus frenatus, elephantfish (Gnathonemus, Hippopotamyrus, Marcusenius, Mormyrus, Petrocephalus, and Pollimyrus), the climbing gourami Ctenopoma muriei and marbled lungfish (Protopterus aethiopicus).

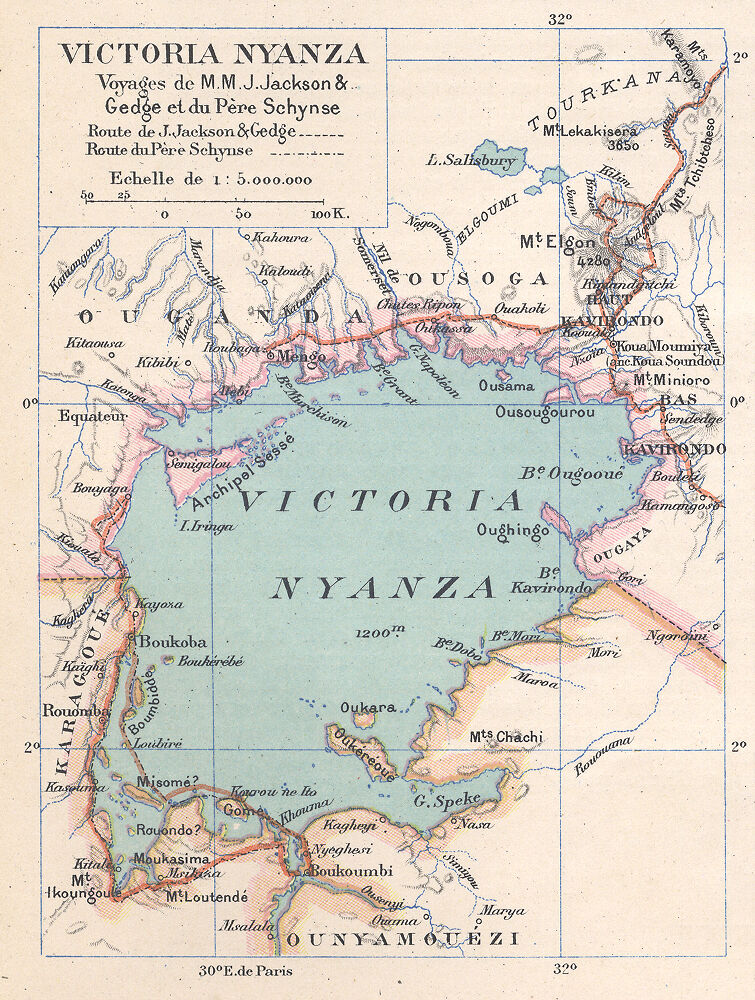
Map of Lake Victoria

At a genus level, most of these are widespread in Africa, but the very rare Xenobarbus and Xenoclarias are endemic to the lake, and the common Rastrineobola is near-endemic.

A restocking effort for the native tilapia species Oreochromis esculentus in Lake Victoria involved Conservation International Kenya, Victory Farms, and the Kenya Marine and Fisheries Research Institute.

=== Crustaceans ===
Four species of freshwater crabs are known from Lake Victoria: Potamonautes niloticus is widespread in the lake and P. emini has been recorded from the vicinity of Bukoba in Tanzania, but both are also found elsewhere in Africa. The last were first scientifically described in 2017 and very little is known about them: P. entebbe is only known from near Entebbe (the only known specimen was collected in 1955 and it is unknown if it was in or near the lake) and P. busungwe only at Busungwe Island in the northwestern part of the lake. The latter likely is the smallest African freshwater crab with a carapace width up to about 1.6 cm (0.6 in), although P. kantsyore of Kagera River, and Platythelphusa maculata and P. polita of Lake Tanganyika are almost as small.

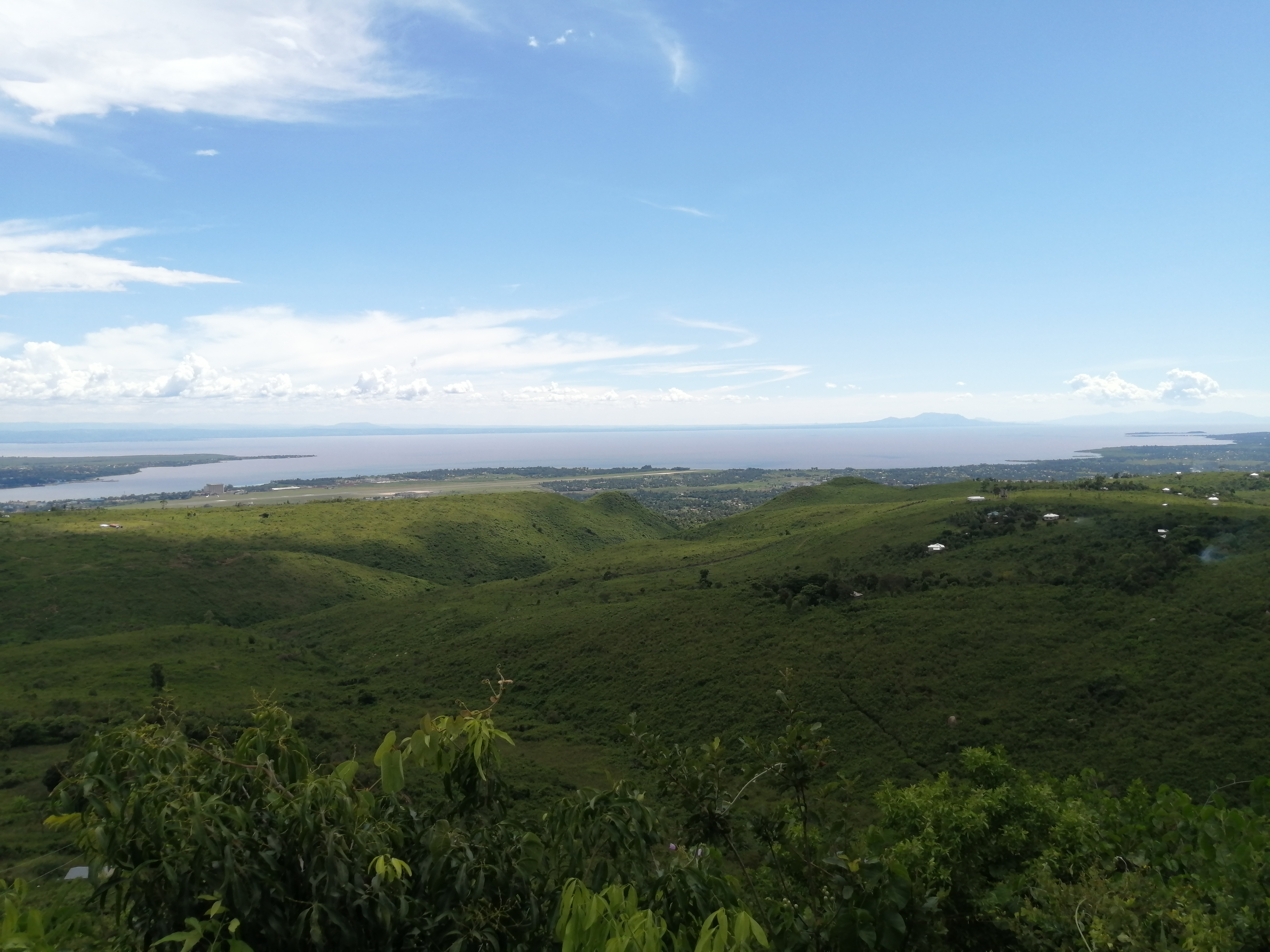
Lake Victoria from a wider angle.

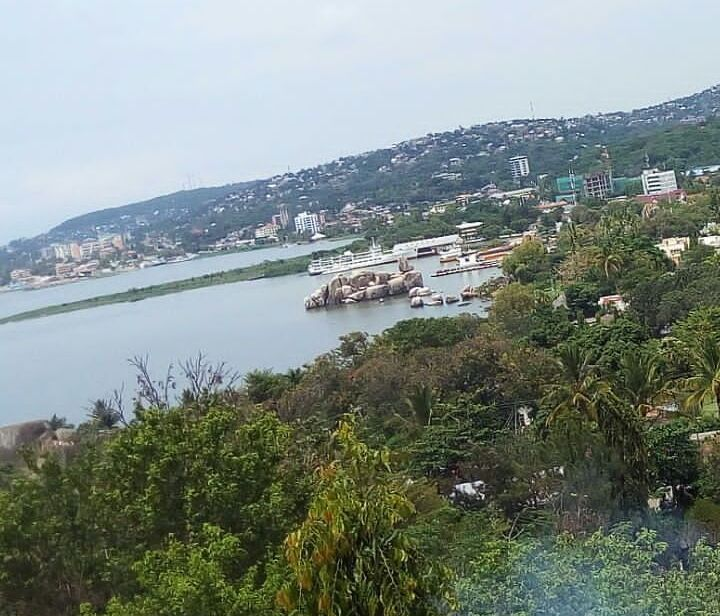
Lake Victoria view from Mwanza Tanzania

The only shrimp/prawn is Caridina nilotica, which is common and widespread in Lake Victoria.

=== Molluscs ===
Lake Victoria is home to 28 species of freshwater snails (e.g., Bellamya, Biomphalaria, Bulinus, Cleopatra, Gabbiella, and Melanoides), including 12 endemic species/subspecies. There are 17 species of bivalves (Corbicula, Coelatura, Sphaerium, and Byssanodonta), including 6 endemic species and subspecies. It is likely that undescribed species of snails remain. Conversely, genetic studies indicate that some morphologically distinctive populations, traditionally regarded as separate species, may only be variants of single species. Two of the snail genera, Biomphalaria and Bulinus, are intermediate hosts of the parasite that causes bilharzia (schistosomiasis). Human infections by this parasite are common at Lake Victoria. This may increase as a result of the spread of the invasive water hyacinth (an optimum snail habitat), and the loss of many snail-eating cichlids in the lake.

=== Spiders ===
Evarcha culicivora is a species of jumping spider (family Salticidae) found only around Lake Victoria in Kenya and Uganda. It feeds primarily on female mosquitos.

== Fisheries ==
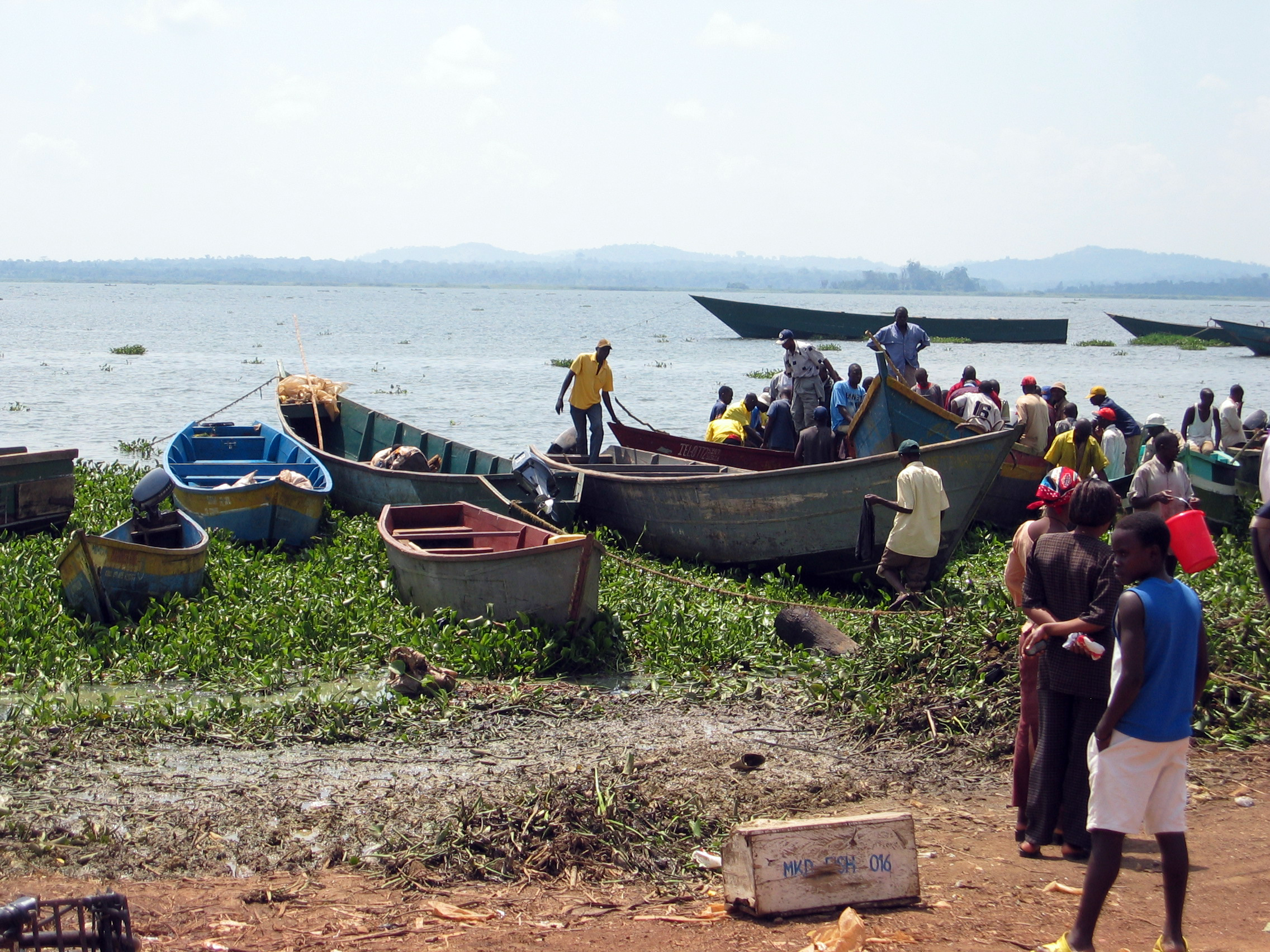
Fishers and their boats on the shore of Lake Victoria

Lake Victoria supports Africa's largest inland fishery (as of 1997). Initially the fishery involved native species, especially tilapia and haplochromine cichlids, but also catfish (Bagrus, Clarias, Synodontis and silver butter catfish), elephantfish, ningu (Labeo victorianus) and marbled lungfish (Protopterus aethiopicus). Some of these, including tilapia and ningu (Labeo victorianus), had already declined in the first half of the 20th century due to overfishing. To boost fishing, several species of non-native tilapia and Nile perch were introduced to the lake in the 1950s. Nevertheless, the natives continued to dominate fisheries until the 1970s where their decline meant that there was a strong shift towards the non-native Nile tilapia (now 7 percent of catches), non-native Nile perch (60 percent) and the native Lake Victoria sardine (30 percent). Because of its small size, the abundant open-water Lake Victoria sardine only supported minor fisheries until the decline of other natives. At the peak in the early 1990s, 500,000 tonnes (490,000 long tons; 550,000 short tons) of Nile perch were landed annually in Lake Victoria, but this has declined significantly in later years.

== Environmental issues ==
A number of environmental issues are associated with Lake Victoria and the complete disappearance of many endemic cichlid species has been called the "most dramatic example of human-caused extinctions within an ecosystem".

=== Invasive fish ===
Starting in the 1950s, many species have been introduced to Lake Victoria where they have become invasive and a prime reason for the extinction of many endemic haplochromine cichlids. Among the introductions are several tilapias: redbreast (Coptodon rendalli), redbelly (C. zillii), Nile (Oreochromis niloticus) and blue-spotted tilapias (O. leucostictus). Although these have contributed to the extinction of native fish by causing significant changes to the ecosystem, outcompeted natives and (in the case of the Nile tilapia) possibly hybridized with the highly threatened native tilapias, the most infamous introduction was the large and highly predatory Nile perch (Lates niloticus).

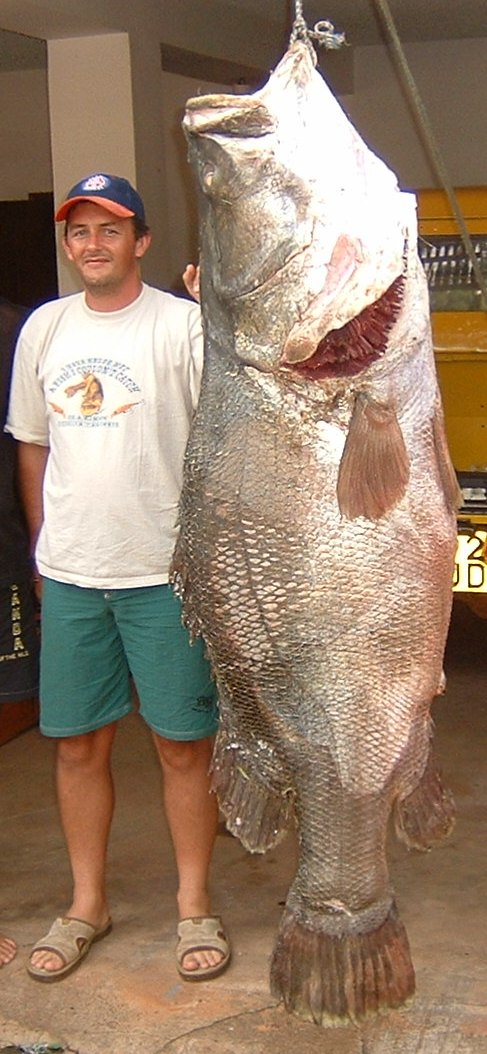
The Nile perch was introduced to Lake Victoria for fishing, and can reach up to 2 m (6.6 ft) and 200 kg (440 lb).

As early as the 1920s, it was proposed to introduce a large pelagic predator such as the Nile perch to improve the fisheries in the lake. At the same time it was warned that this could present a serious danger to the native fish species and required extensive research into possible ecological effects before done. These warnings primarily concerned the native tilapia O. esculentus, as the smaller haplochromine cichlids (despite playing an important role in local fisheries) were regarded as "trash fish" by the colonial government. In the following decades, the pressure to introduce the Nile perch continued, as did warnings about the possible effects of doing it. The first introduction of Nile perch to the region, done by the Uganda Game and Fisheries Department (then part of the colonial government) and local African fish guards, happened upstream of Murchison Falls directly after the completion of the Owen Falls Dam in 1954. This allowed it to spread to Lake Kyoga where additional Nile perch were released in 1955, but not Victoria itself. Scientists argued that further introduction should wait until research showed the effect of the introduction in Kyoga, but by the late 1950s, Nile perch began being caught in Lake Victoria. As the species was already present, there were few objections when more Nile perch were transferred to Victoria to further bolster the stock in 1962–63.

The origin of the first Victoria introductions in the 1950s is not entirely clear and indisputable evidence is lacking. Uganda Game and Fisheries Department (UGFD) officials denied that they were involved, but circumstantial evidence suggests otherwise and local Africans employed by UGFD have said that they introduced the species in 1954–55 under the directive of senior officials. UGFD officials argued that Nile perch must have spread to Lake Victoria by themselves by passing through the Owen Falls Dam when shut down for maintenance, but this is considered highly unlikely by many scientists. The Nile perch had spread throughout the lake by 1970. Initially the population of the Nile perch was relatively low, but a drastic increase happened, peaking in the 1980s, followed by a decline starting in the 1990s.

=== Water hyacinth invasion ===
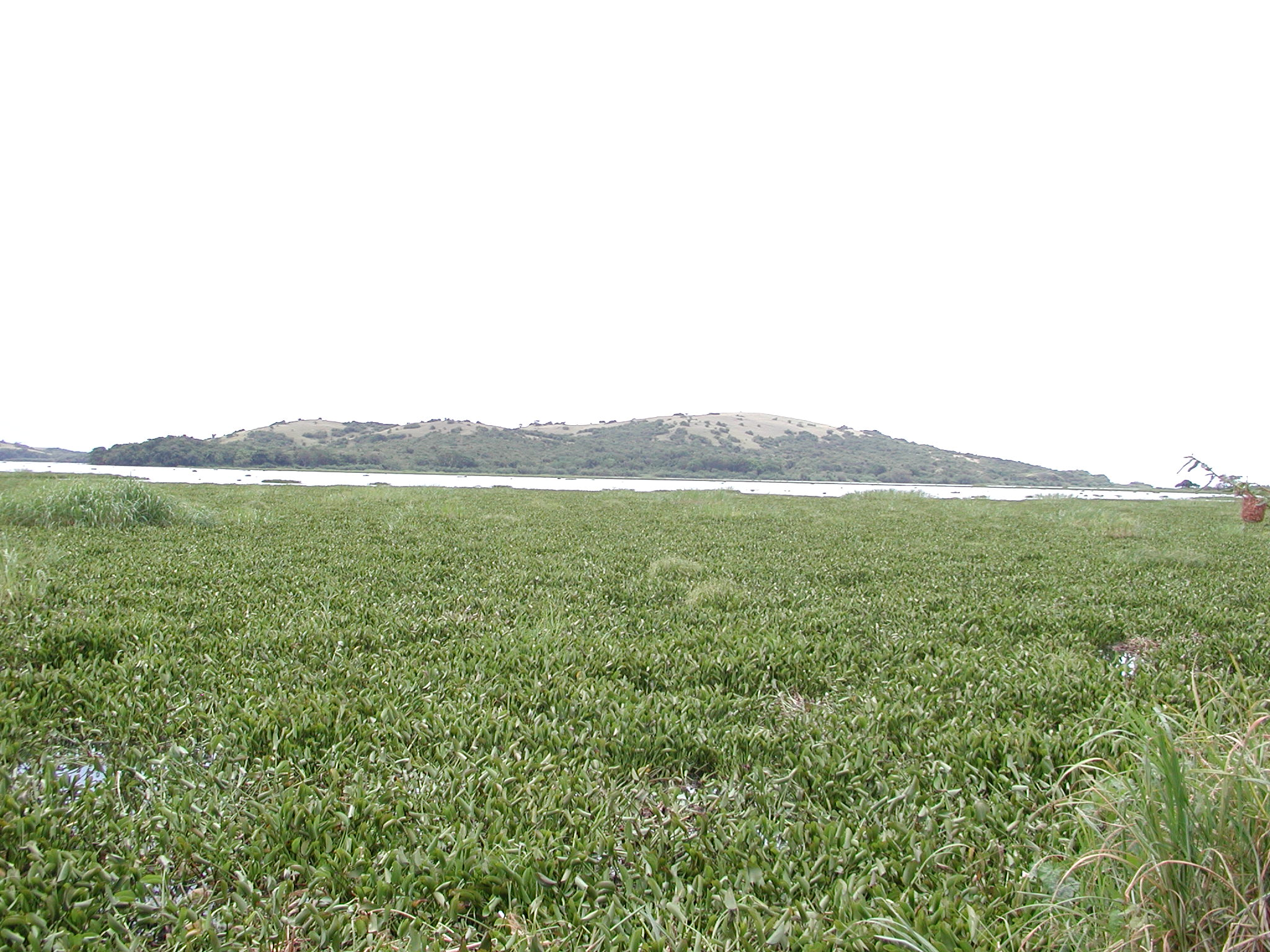
A hyacinth-choked lakeshore at Ndere Island, Lake Victoria, Kenya.

The water hyacinth has become a major invasive plant species in Lake Victoria.

The release of large amounts of untreated wastewater (sewage) and agricultural and industrial runoff directly into Lake Victoria over the past 30 years has greatly increased the nutrient levels of nitrogen and phosphorus in the lake "triggering massive growth of exotic water hyacinth, which colonised the lake in the late 1990s". This invasive weed creates anoxic (total depletion of oxygen levels) conditions in the lake, inhibiting decomposing plant material, raising toxicity and disease levels to both fish and people. At the same time, the plant's mat or "web" creates a barrier for boats and ferries to maneuver, impedes access to the shoreline, interferes with hydroelectric power generation, and blocks the intake of water for industries. On the other hand, water hyacinth mats can potentially have a positive effect on fish life in that they create a barrier to overfishing and allow for fish growth, there has even been the reappearance of some fish species thought to have been extinct in recent years. The overall effects of the water hyacinth, however, are still unknown.

Growth of the water hyacinth in Lake Victoria has been tracked since 1993, reaching its maxima biomass in 1997 and then declining again by the end of 2001. Greater growth was observed in the northern part of the lake, in relatively protected areas, which may be linked to current and weather patterns and could also be due to the climate and water conditions, which are more suitable to the plants growth (as there are large urban areas to the north end of the lake, in Uganda). The invasive weed was first attempted to be controlled by hand, removed manually from the lake; however, re-growth occurred quickly. Public awareness exercises were also conducted. More recently, measures have been used such as the introduction of natural insect predators, including two different water hyacinth weevils and large harvesting and chopping boats, which seem to be much more effective in eliminating the water hyacinth. A green power plant that uses harvested water hyacinth (but also can use other degradable waste) was constructed in Kisumu County in 2013. In addition to the biogas it produces, its by-product can be used as fertilizer.

Other factors which may have contributed to the decline of the water hyacinth in Lake Victoria include varying weather patterns, such as El Niño during the last few months of 1997 and first six months of 1998 bringing with it higher levels of water in the lake and thus dislodging the plants. Heavy winds and rains along with their subsequent waves may have also damaged the plants during this same time frame. The plants may not have been destroyed, instead merely moved to another location. Additionally, the water quality, nutrient supply, temperature, and other environmental factors could have played a role. Overall, the timing of the decline could be linked to all of these factors and perhaps together, in combination, they were more effective than any one deterrent would have been by itself. The water hyacinth is in remission and this trend could be permanent if control efforts are continued.

=== Pollution ===
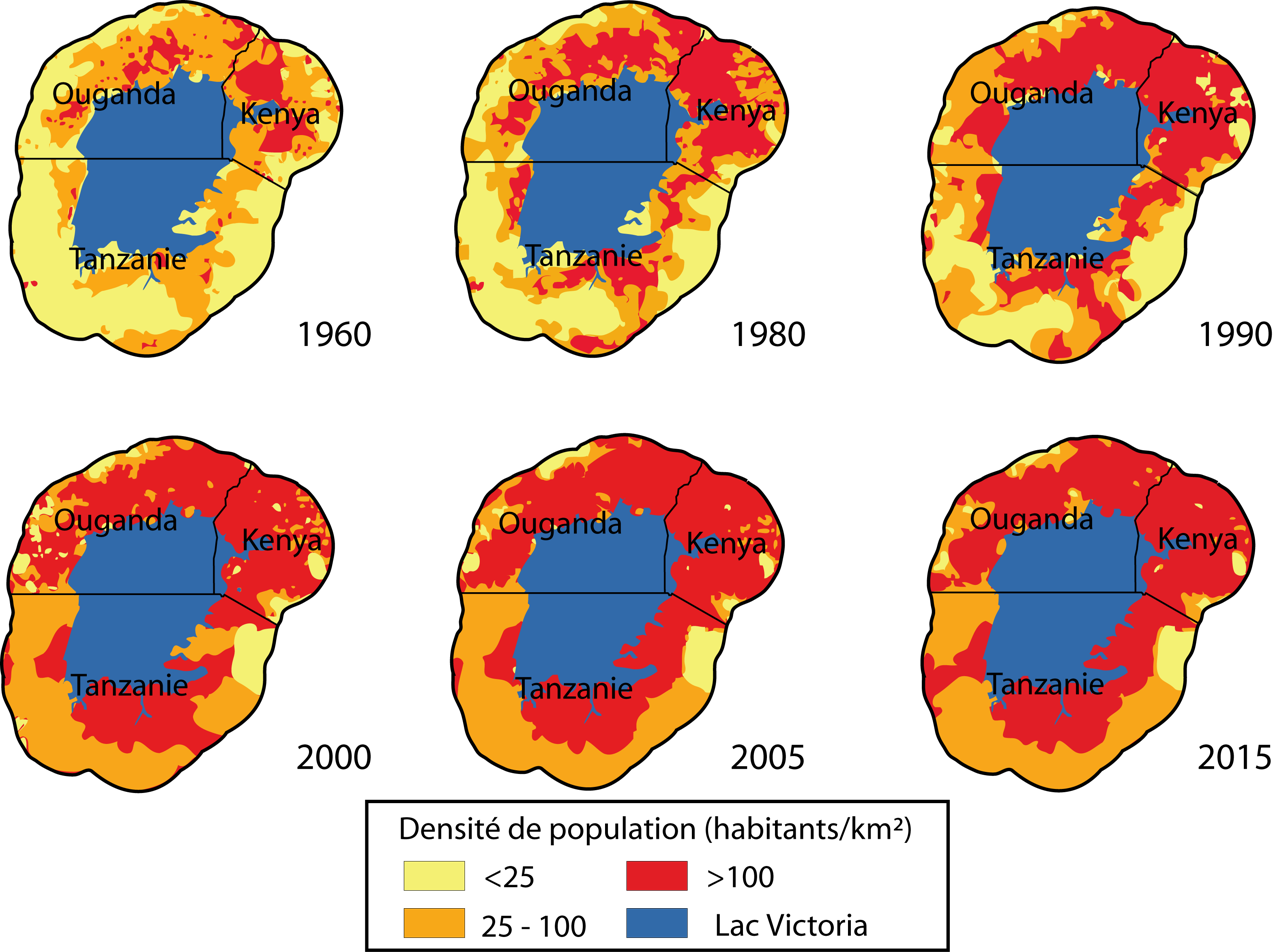
Population density around Lake Victoria

Pollution of Lake Victoria is mainly due to discharge of raw sewage into the lake, dumping of domestic and industrial waste, and fertiliser and chemicals from farms.

The Lake Victoria basin, while generally rural, has many major centres of population. Its shores are dotted with key cities and towns, including Kisumu, Kisii, and Homa Bay in Kenya; Kampala, Jinja and Entebbe in Uganda; and Bukoba, Mwanza, and Musoma in Tanzania. These cities and towns are also home to many factories that discharge some chemicals directly into the lake or its influent rivers. The set up of small beaches and local authorities around the lake lack proper sewage treatment facilities allowing pollutants to find their way into the water. Large parts of these urban areas also discharge untreated (raw) sewage into the river, increasing its eutrophication that in turn is helping to increase the invasive water hyacinth. Increased logging and act of deforestation has led to environmental degradation around the region reducing the absorption of polluting chemicals and deteriorating the water quality.

=== Environmental data ===
As of 2016, an environmental data repository exists for Lake Victoria. The repository contains shoreline, bathymetry, pollution, temperature, wind vector, and other important data for both the lake and the wider Basin. This was significantly expanded in May 2026 with the release of the inaugural State of the Basin Report (SOBR) 2025 by the East African Community and the Lake Victoria Basin Commission. Announced during the first 'Lake Victoria Day' in Mwanza, the report utilizes a €60 million Water Information System to monitor ecological pressures and climate resilience for the 45 million people living within the catchment area.

== History and exploration ==
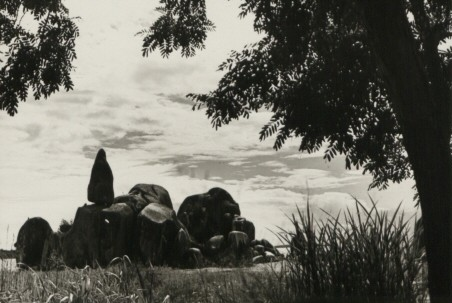
Bismarck Rock

The first recorded information about Lake Victoria comes from Arab traders plying the inland routes in search of gold, ivory, other precious commodities, and slaves.

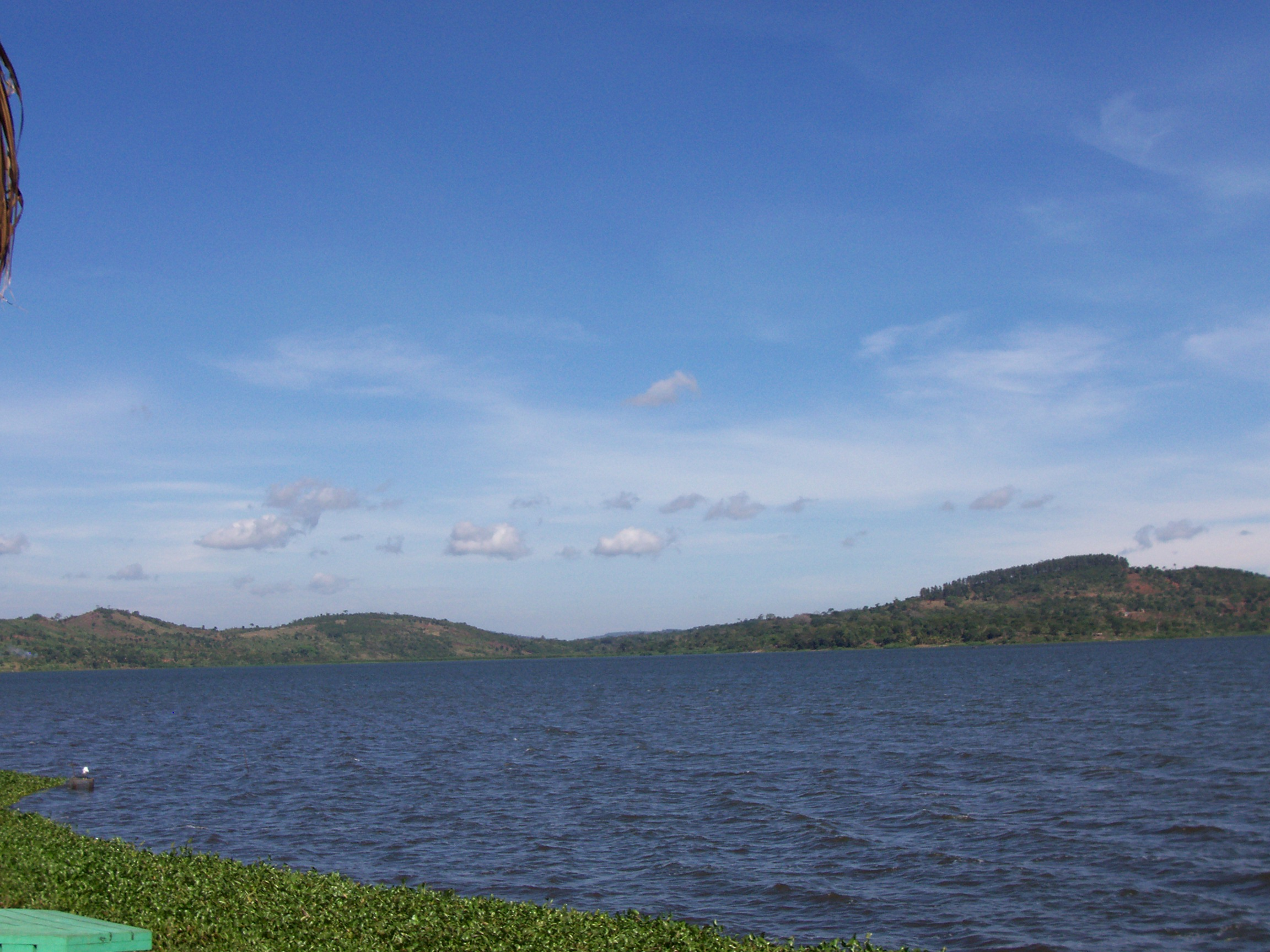
The lake as seen from the shores of the Speke Resort in Kampala, Uganda

Many Africans tribes lived in the catchment area around the lake. It was first sighted by a European in 1858 when the British explorer John Hanning Speke reached its southern shore while on his journey with Richard Francis Burton to explore central Africa and locate the Great Lakes. Believing he had found the source of the Nile on seeing this "vast expanse of open water" for the first time, Speke named the lake after Queen Victoria. Burton, who had been recovering from illness at the time and resting further south in Kazeh (near present-day Tabora), was outraged that Speke claimed to have proved his discovery to have been the true source of the Nile River, which Burton regarded as still unsettled. A very public quarrel ensued, which not only sparked a great deal of intense debate within the scientific community of the day, but also much interest by other explorers keen to either confirm or refute Speke's discovery.

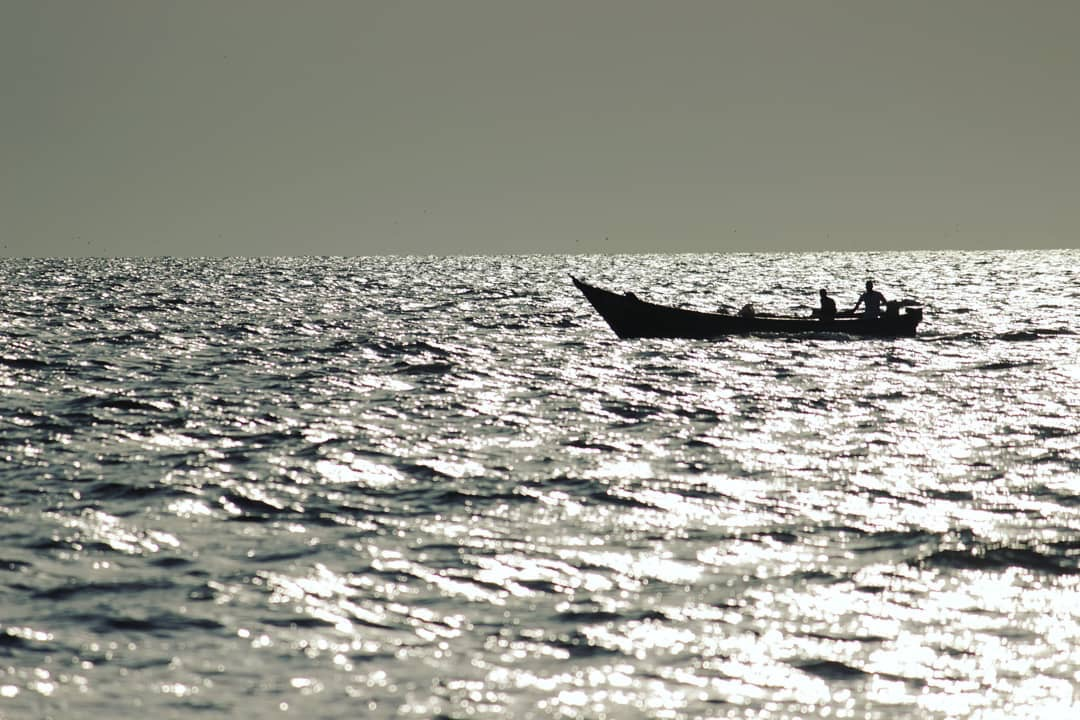
Motorboat on Lake Victoria, near the Ugandan shore

In the late 1860s, the famous Scottish explorer and missionary David Livingstone failed in his attempt to verify Speke's discovery, instead pushing too far west and entering the River Congo system instead. Ultimately, the British-American explorer Henry Morton Stanley, on an expedition funded by the New York Herald newspaper, confirmed the truth of Speke's discovery, circumnavigating the lake over 1875-76 and reporting the great outflow at Ripon Falls on the lake's northern shore.

== Water use ==
Many towns and cities are reliant on Lake Victoria for their water supplies, for farming and other uses.

=== Lamadi water scheme ===
The Lamadi water scheme is a water and sanitation project that serves Mwanza and the satellite towns of Lamadi, Misungwi, Magu, Bukoba, and Musoma on the bank of Lake Victoria. European Investment Bank started the project in 2013 with the aim of protecting the environmental health of the lake, through improved water and sanitation to the towns whose pollution is part of the degradation of the lake. The project aims to provide safe drinking water for an estimated one million people and improved sanitation for 100 000 people. Sediment and suspended solids are filtered out using sand, which acts like a sieve. The water is then ready to be chlorinated or treated in another way. The sand filtration helps reduce water-borne diseases and is based on the use of the local environment.

=== Nalubaale Dam ===
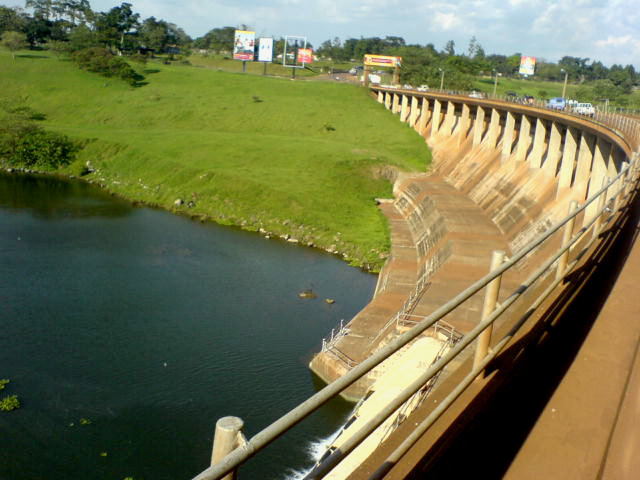
The Nalubaale Hydroelectric Power Station in Njeru, Uganda.

The only outflow for Lake Victoria is at Jinja, Uganda, where it forms the Victoria Nile. The water for at least 12,000 years has drained across a natural rock weir. In 1952, engineers acting for the government of Colonial Uganda blasted out the weir and reservoir to replace it with an artificial barrage to control the level of the lake and reduce the gradual erosion of the rock weir. A standard for mimicking the old rate of outflow called the "agreed curve" was established, setting the maximum flow rate at 300 to 1,700 cubic metres per second (392–2,224 cu yd/sec) depending on the lake's water level.

In 2002, Uganda completed a second hydroelectric complex in the area, the Kiira Hydroelectric Power Station, with World Bank assistance. By 2006, the water levels in Lake Victoria had reached an 80-year low, and Daniel Kull, an independent hydrologist living in Nairobi, Kenya, calculated that Uganda was releasing about twice as much water as is allowed under the agreement, and was primarily responsible for recent drops in the lake's level.

== Transport ==
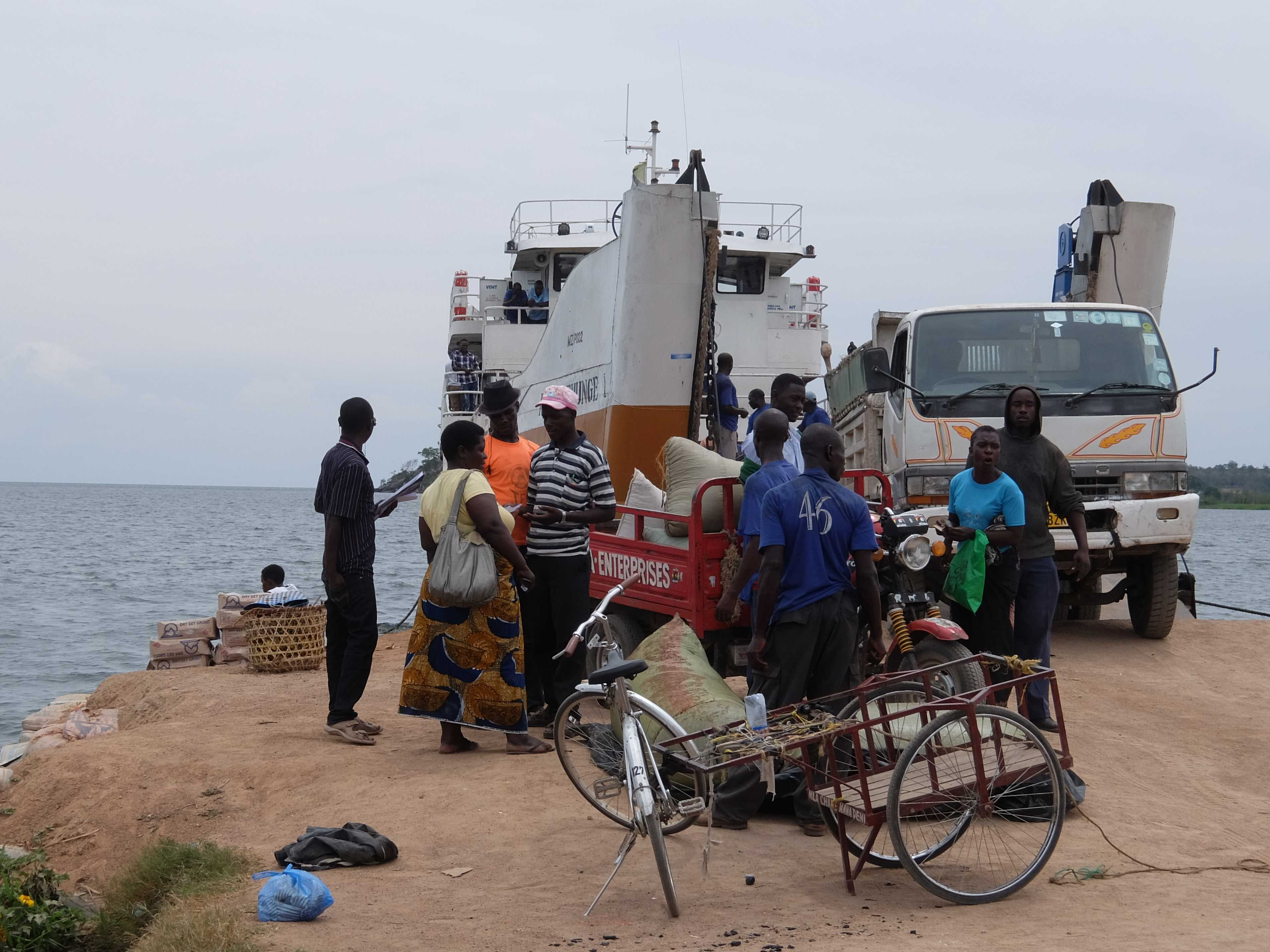
Ukerewe-Mwanza Ferry.

Since the 1900s, Lake Victoria ferries have been an important means of transport between Uganda, Tanzania, and Kenya. The main ports on the lake are Kisumu, Mwanza, Bukoba, Entebbe, Port Bell, and Jinja. Until 1963, the fastest and newest ferry, MV Victoria, was designated a Royal Mail Ship. In 1966, train ferry services between Kenya and Tanzania were established with the introduction of MV Uhuru and MV Umoja. The ferry MV Bukoba sank in the lake on 21 May 1996 with a loss of between 800 and 1,000 lives, making it one of Africa's worst maritime disasters. Another tragedy occurred recently on 20 September 2018 that involved the passagers ferry MV Nyerere from Tanzania that caused the deaths of over 200 people.

On 6 November 2022, Lake Victoria was the site of a commercial passenger aircraft crash. Precision Air Flight 494, an ATR 42–500 carrying 39 passengers and four crew, crashed while approaching Bukoba Airport, resulting in 19 fatalities.

== In popular culture ==
- Lake Victoria, its shores, and islands are featured in Jules Verne's novel Five Weeks in a Balloon, in which travelers cross the lake from east to northwest in search of the source of the Nile (chapters 18 and 19).
- In the adventure film Five Weeks in a Balloon (1962), Professor Ferguson and his companions fly across Lake Victoria by hot air balloon during an expedition from Zanzibar to West Africa, to the Volta River.
- In Ivan Yefremov's historical novel At the Edge of Oikoumene (The Land of Foam), an expedition of ancient Egyptians reached the land of Punt (present-day Somalia) by ship, and from there the foot troops reached the Zambezi River and Lake Victoria (Part 1, "The Journey of Baurdjed").
- In Andrei Gusev's story Consummation in Mombasa (2017), the main characters, Andy and Jennifer, go on a honeymoon from Mombasa to Kisumu, on the shores of Lake Victoria, and then relax in a boarding house on the Kenyan island of Takawiri in the middle of Lake Victoria.

== See also ==
- Darwin's Nightmare
- Kishanda
