= Xenoclarias =

Scientific classification
- Kingdom: Animalia
- Phylum: Chordata
- Class: Actinopterygii
- Order: Siluriformes
- Family: Clariidae
- Genus: Xenoclarias; Greenwood, 1958

Type species
- Clarias eupogon Norman, 1928

Genus of fishes

Xenoclarias is a genus of airbreathing catfishes (family Clariidae) endemic to Lake Victoria. This genus contains two species

- Xenoclarias eupogon (Norman, 1928) (Lake Victoria deepwater catfish)
- Xenoclarias holobranchus Greenwood, 1958
