= Metal Industries, Limited =

Metal Industries, Limited was a conglomerate of mostly British engineering companies. It was founded in Glasgow in 1922 by Robert Watson McCrone. In 1953 its activities were described as "electrical and mechanical engineering manufacture and metal trading" In 1967, Aberdare Holdings of South Wales acquired a controlling interest in the group, but was quickly thwarted when M.I. created a large tranche of new shares which it sold to Thorn Electrical Industries, giving Thorn overall control of the company. The City Panel on Takeovers and Mergers referred to "abuses and inequities" that occurred during this chaotic takeover, among others at the time, but declined to recommend tougher regulations. A good history of the company's shipbreaking activities was published by the World Ship Society in 1992 in Ian Buxton's "Metal Industries: Shipbreaking at Rosyth and Charlestown".

The subsidiary companies continued to trade as the 'Metal Industries' group of Thorn until 1970, when it merged with the George Cohen 600 group to become Six Hundred Metal Holdings. In 1976, Thorn sold its interest in the group to the government-owned British Steel Corporation.

== Timeline of acquisitions, mergers, sales and closures ==
- 1922: Formed as Alloa Shipbreaking Co., Rosyth & Charlestown
- October 1926: Purchased Rosyth Shipbreaking Co. and gained their leases at HM Dockyard, Rosyth
- 1932: Sale of oxygen business to British Oxygen Company
- 1935: Metal Industries, Limited converted to public company
- 1940: Acquisition of Electrical Switchgear and Associated Industries Ltd. and its subsidiary Brookhirst Switchgear Ltd., Chester
- 1941: Sentinel Waggon Works (1936) Limited
- 1942: Igranic Electric Co., Bedford
- 1945: Sentinel Waggon Works renamed to Sentinel (Shrewsbury) Limited
- 1946: Reorganisation: Metal Industries (Electrical Group) Limited set up to organise all electrical business; Metal Industries (Salvage) Ltd., Faslane, to take over salvage business; Sentinel (Shrewsbury) Limited to run engineering business; Metal Industries, Ltd. to become holding company
- 1947: Ferrous Light Castings, Warrington (completion of acquisition)
- 1948: Fawcett Preston & Co. Ltd., Bromborough (founded 1758)
- 1948: Cantle Switches Ltd. (closed 1958)
- 1949: John Allan & Co. (Glenpark) Ltd. (est. 1898)
- 1949: Cox and Danks Ltd. (see Ernest Cox)
- 1952 or earlier: Hughes Bolckow Shipbreaking Company Limited, Blyth
- 1955: Formation of Metind Limited
- 1955: Acquisition of resistor business from the Rheostatic Company
- 1955: Acquisition of Finney Presses Ltd.
- 1956: Sale of Sentinel (Shrewsbury) Limited to Rolls-Royce
- 1957 or earlier: Shipbreaking Industries Limited
- 1957: Closure of Metind Limited
- 1959: Merger of Igranic with Brookhirst
- 1958: Merger of Finney Presses Limited, Birmingham with Fawcett Preston
- 1958: Sale of British Oxygen Company Limited
- 1958: Farmer Brothers (Shifnal) Limited
- 1959: Avo Ltd. and subsidiary Taylor Electrical Instruments Limited
- 1959: Olaer France S.A., Paris
- 1959: Towler Brothers (Patents) Limited
- May 1959: International Rectifier Co. (Great Britain) Limited, at Oxted, Surrey, joint-owned with International Rectifier of California
- 1960: Lancashire Dynamo Group, including:
  - Lancashire Dynamo Nevelin, Oxted
  - Lancashire Dynamo & Crypto, Trafford Park (sold to A.E.I., 1967)
  - Lancashire Dynamo Electronic Products
  - Foster Transformers, Wimbledon & Leatherhead
  - J. G. Statter & Co., Amersham
- 1961 or earlier: New Eagle Foundry, Birmingham
- 1961 or earlier: Cable Jointers, Crypton Equipment, Dynamo & Motor Repairs, Minerva Mouldings
- 1961 or earlier: Metal Industries (Europe) S.A.
- 1961: Closure of Metal Industries (Salvage) Limited
- 1963: M.I. (South Africa) (Pty.), renamed from Brookhirst Igranic South Africa (Pty.)
- 1963 or earlier: Dominion M.I. Limited, Montreal
- 1964 or earlier: Mattel-Marden Limited (joint owned)
- 1964: Acquisition of 50% of International Rectifier Corporation Italiana S.p.A.
- 1965: Acquisition of 50% of International Rectifier Europe S.A.
- 1966: Industrial Automation Controls Ltd. (set up to coordinate Brookhirst Igranic and Lancashire Dynamo Electronic Products)
- 1966: Disposal of Fawcett Preston
- Aug 1967: Acquired by Thorn
- 1970: Merged into Six Hundred Metal Holdings

== Chairmen ==
- 1922-1951: J Donald Pollock
- 1952-1955: Robert Watson McCrone
- 1955: J S Hutchison
- 1956-1964: Charles Westlake
- 1965-? Alexander I. McKenzie

== Notable salvage operations ==
- 1934: SMS Bayern, Scapa Flow
- 1935: SMS König Albert, Scapa Flow
- 1936: SMS Kaiserin, Scapa Flow
- 1937: SMS Friedrich der Grosse, Scapa Flow
- 1938: SMS Grosser Kurfürst, Scapa Flow
- 1939: SMS Derfflinger, Scapa Flow
- 1947: HMS Iron Duke, Scapa Flow
- 1952: SS Oljaren, Pentland Firth
- 1952: SS Margareta, Ailsa Craig
- 1957: Lona, Hull
- 1957: Suez Canal

== Bibliography ==
- Buxton, Ian L. (1992). Metal Industries: Shipbreaking at Rosyth and Charlestown. Kendal, UK: World Ship Society. OCLC 28617824.
