= Nalubaale Hydroelectric Power Station =

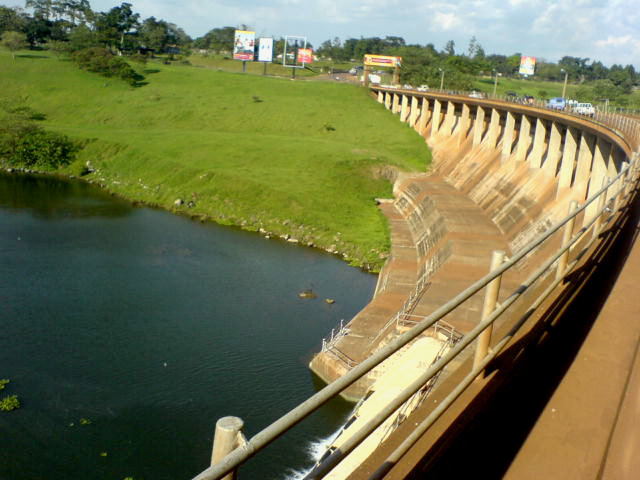
- View from top of dam

- Location within Uganda Location within Africa Location within Earth
- Country: Uganda
- Location: Jinja
- Coordinates: 00°26′37″N 33°11′06″E
- Purpose: Power
- Status: Operational
- Opening date: 1954; 72 years ago
- Operator: Uganda Electricity Generation Company Limited

Dam and spillways
- Impounds: White Nile
- Spillways: 6
- Spillway type: Under sluice

Nalubaale Power Station
- Operator: Uganda Electricity Generation Company Limited
- Turbines: 10
- Installed capacity: 180 MW (240,000 hp)
- Website [uegcl.go.ug]

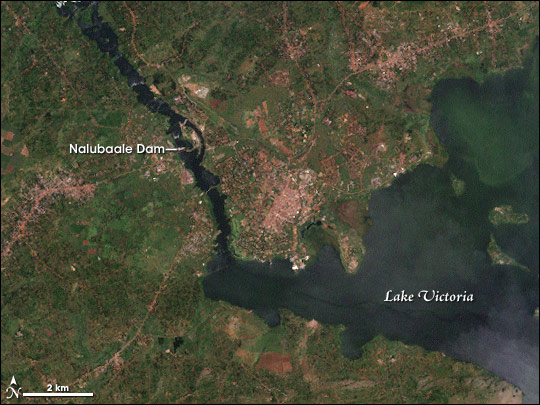
Satellite image showing the location of the dam in relation to Lake Victoria

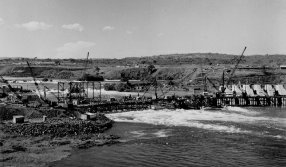
Construction of the Owen Falls Dam in early 1950s

Nalubaale Power Station, formerly known as Owen Falls Dam, is a hydroelectric power station across the White Nile near its source at Lake Victoria in Uganda. Nalubaale is the Luganda name for Lake Victoria.

== Location ==
The dam sits across the Nile River between the town of Jinja, in Jinja District approximately 85 kilometres (53 mi), by road, east of Kampala.

== History ==
Before the construction of the dam, water levels on Lake Victoria were moderated by a natural rock dam on the north side of the lake. Rising lake waters would spill over the natural dam into the White Nile, which flows through Uganda, South Sudan, Sudan, and Egypt before emptying into the Mediterranean Sea. When water levels dropped too low, flow into the river ceased.

In 1947, Charles Redvers Westlake, an English engineer, reported to the Colonial Government of Uganda recommending the construction of a hydroelectric dam at Owen Falls near the city of Jinja. This led to the establishment of the Uganda Electricity Board (UEB), with Westlake as its first chairman. A treaty between Uganda and Egypt ensured that the dam would not alter the natural flow of the Nile. The consultant engineer on the project was Sir Alexander Gibb & Partners. Eighty thousand tons of plant and construction materials (including 36,000 tons of cement) were shipped from Europe in the difficult post-war period. They were then transported 1,200 kilometres (750 mi) by rail from Mombasa to Jinja. The dam was completed in three years, ahead of schedule in 1954, submerging Ripon Falls.

It supplies electricity to Uganda and parts of neighbouring Kenya and Tanzania. Maintenance and availability of the station declined seriously during the government of Idi Amin.

The rating of the Nalubaale power station is 180 megawatts (MW). Originally it was designed for ten turbines rated at 15 MW each (for a total of 150 MW). The station was refurbished in the 1990s to repair the accumulated wear from a decade of civil disorder. During the repairs, the output power of the generators was increased, bringing the Nalubaale Power Complex's generating capacity to 180 MW.

== Operations ==
The Uganda Government, through the Uganda Electricity Generation Company (UEGCL), a 100 percent parastatal, awarded a 20-year operational, management and maintenance concession to Eskom Uganda Limited, a subsidiary of Eskom, South Africa, to cover both Nalubaale Power Station and the adjacent Kiira Power Station. The concession agreement commenced in 2002. The electricity generated, is sold to the Uganda Electricity Transmission Company Limited (UETCL), the authorized single buyer. UETCL in turn sells the power to UEDCL, the energy distributor.

On 31 March 2023, the 20-year concession with Eskom for both dams expired and was not renewed. Uganda Electricity Generation Company Limited (UEGCL) took over the management of the power stations and absorbed 93 percent of Eskom Uganda staff, effective 1 April 2023.

== Maintenance ==
In 2021, Eskom Uganda Limited hired Babcon Uganda Limited at a cost of USh888 million (approx. US$251,000) to repair and strengthen the powerhouse staircase to Units 1, 5 and 9. The deterioration of the staircase is blamed on Alkali Silica Reaction (ASR), which results when water reacts with concrete, over time, causing expansion of the concrete and loosening of attached hardware.

In September the same year, Sinohydro Corporation Limited completed renovations to the dam's structure. The repairs, which took nearly one year, were meant to stop water leakage from the "deterioration of the grout curtain". It is expected that the repairs, last carried out in 1999, will give the dam at least another 20 years of life. The repairs cost USh11.6 billion (US$3.3 million).

In September 2022, Eskom Uganda spent UGX:6.84 billion (approx. US$1.8 million) to replace three of the ten generator transformers. The transformers to units 3, 5 and 6 "were past their service life expectancy" and were replaced. The transformers from units 1 to 4, step up voltage from 11 kV to 33 kV, while those from units 5 to 10 step up voltage from 11 kV to 132 kV. The power at high voltage is then transmitted to the grid. Transmission at high voltage over long distances reduces power losses.

== Owen Falls Extension ==
In 1993 work started on the Owen Falls Extension project, a second powerhouse located about 1 km from the 1954 powerhouse. A new canal was cut to bring water from Lake Victoria to the new powerhouse. Major construction was completed in 1999 with first power from the projects two units in 2000. The extension has space for five hydroelectric turbine generators with four installed as of 2001. Each unit at the extension has a capacity of 40 megawatts. During official opening ceremonies in 2003, the extension was named the Kiira Power Station. Design and project management of the extension project was by Acres International of Canada, now known as Hatch Limited.

Eskom Uganda operates Nalubaale Power Station as a concessionaire. They regularly clear debris water hyacinth from the intakes of the stations. Further downstream, the 250 MW Bujagali Hydroelectric Power Station was constructed between 2007 and 2012.

== Lake Victoria water levels ==
Since January 2006, hydroelectric generation at Nalubaale and Kiira stations has been curtailed due to a prolonged drought and low level of water in Lake Victoria. The hydrology of Lake Victoria has unusual features.

In 2006 there was a release of secret documents from 1956 in Britain that indicated the British had considered using this dam to reduce the water in the Nile in an effort to remove Egyptian President Nasser. The plan was not carried out because it would have seasonally flooded land in Kenya, Uganda and Tanzania, reduced flows to a trickle in Sudan and the effect of shutting off the White Nile even to coincide with the seasonal lull in the Blue Nile would not have affected Egypt for at least 16 months. Veto power over construction projects on the Nile River and its tributaries was granted to Egypt by the Anglo-Egyptian treaty of 1929, reinforced by the bilateral agreement between Egypt and Sudan signed in 1959. In 1959 upriver Nile states such as Uganda denounced this treaty purportedly claiming virtually all of the waters of the Nile to themselves and leaving none to the downriver states. The countries along the White Nile excluding Sudan seek to create a unified international legal framework for the basin and for the time being respect keeping lake levels virtually unaltered so as not to upset their own eco-systems and established patterns of crop production and livestock raising.

== Developments ==
In October 2024, Jan Sadek, the ambassador of the European Union to Uganda, announced an economic package valued at €170 million (UGX:680 billion), to rehabilitate, stabilize and prolong the life of both Nalubaale and Kiira dams. Of the total, €30 million is a grant from the EU to the government of Uganda. The remaining €140 million is a concessional loan from the European Investment Bank and the French Development Agency (FDA).

A Dutch biology student is walking over the Nalubaale dam. The mobile crane on the dam, 1961

Pedestrians on the dam, which is discharging water, 1961

Foaming water seen from the discharging dam, 1961

A fisherman on the shore near the dam, 1961

== See also ==
- Energy in Uganda
- Bujagali Power Station
- List of hydropower stations in Africa
- List of power stations in Uganda
