= Nokwanda Mngeni =

South African accountant and business executive

- Born: March 1, 1962 (age 64); Eastern Cape, South Africa
- Citizenship: South Africa
- Education: University of Fort Hare (Bachelor of Commerce); University of South Africa (Bachelor of Accounting Science); City University of New York (Executive Diploma in Strategic Management) (Advanced Certificate in Auditing)
- Occupations: Accountant, business executive
- Years active: 2008–present
- Title: Former managing director, Eskom Uganda Limited (2008–2015)

Nokwanda Mngeni is a South African accountant and business executive. She was CEO of Eskom Uganda Limited (EUL), an electricity utility company that manages two government-owned hydroelectric power stations, for a 20-year concession under a Uganda government regulatory framework. EUL is a wholly owned subsidiary of Eskom, the South African energy conglomerate.

== Background and education ==
Mngeni was born in Eastern Cape, South Africa, circa 1962, to Mercy Nisipho and Belton Bonsile. She is the fourth-born in a family of eight siblings.

She studied at Fort Hare University, graduating with a Bachelor of Commerce degree. She then transferred to the University of South Africa, where she obtained a Bachelor of Accounting Science degree. Later, she obtained an Executive Diploma in Strategic Management and an Advanced Certificate in Auditing from the City University of New York in the United States.

== Career ==
In 1993, Mngeni joined Eskom as an accountant. She served as finance manager, then finance director. She was transferred to Eskom's 100 percent subsidiary, Eskom Uganda Limited in 2003, serving as chief finance officer until 2008, when she was named CEO of EUL.

She is credited with the establishment of a talents management programme at EUL. The programme identifies capable employees, who are then trained to fit into leadership roles in the energy sector. Since 2003, more than ten individuals have been trained and hired/retained at EUL. She is also credited with the founding of Electricity Generators and Distributors of Uganda, an association that promotes best practices and information-sharing among workers in the industry.

In May 2015, Mngeni was named among the "60 Most Influential Figures in the East and West African Energy Sectors" by ESI Africa, an African portal for power and utility stakeholders.
