= Acanthothelphusa niloticus =

Acanthothelphusa niloticus Temporal range: Late Miocene–Recent

Conservation status
- Least Concern (IUCN 3.1)

Scientific classification
- Kingdom: Animalia
- Phylum: Arthropoda
- Clade: Pancrustacea
- Class: Malacostraca
- Order: Decapoda
- Suborder: Pleocyemata
- Infraorder: Brachyura
- Family: Potamonautidae
- Genus: Acanthothelphusa
- Species: A. niloticus

Binomial name
- Acanthothelphusa niloticus H. Milne-Edwards, 1837

Species of crab

Acanthothelphusa niloticus is a species of freshwater crab in the family Potamonautidae. It is found in the Nile Basin in Egypt, Ethiopia, Rwanda, Sudan, and Uganda. Numerous specimens of A. niloticus are known from Miocene deposits around Lake Albert.
