= Kiira Hydroelectric Power Station =

Power station in Uganda

Kiira Power Station
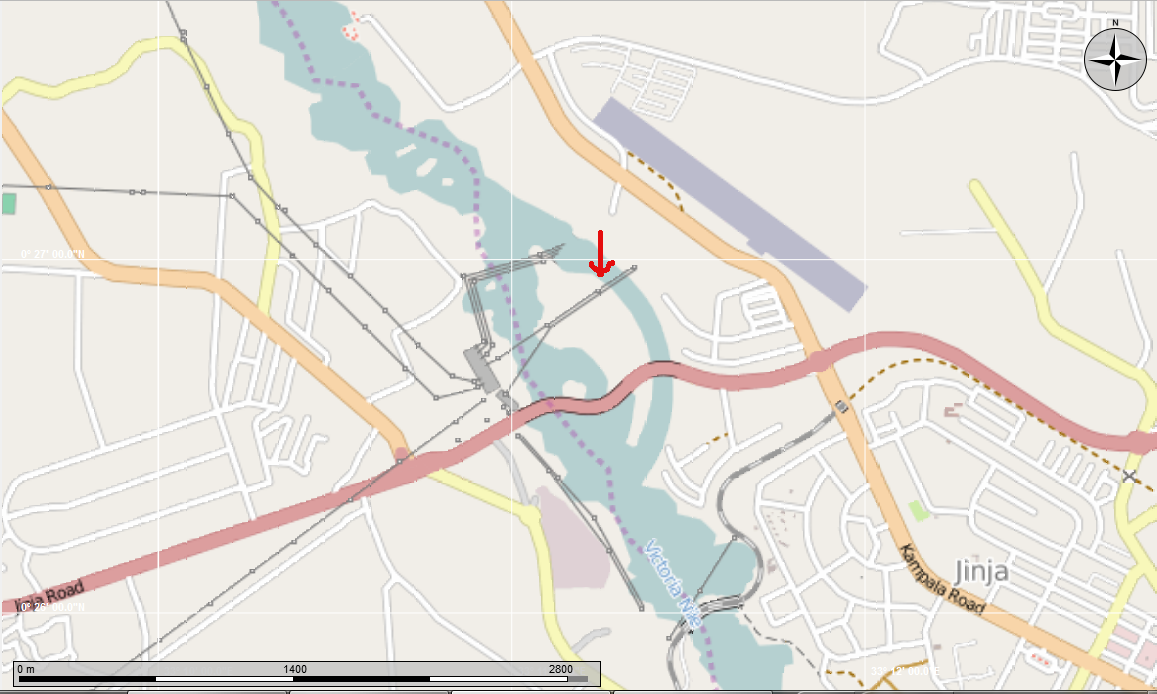
- Kiira Hydroelectric Power Station, marked with a red arrow.

- Map of Uganda showing the location of Kiira Power Station Kiira Power Station (Africa) Kiira Power Station (Earth)
- Official name: Kiira Hydropower Station
- Country: Uganda
- Location: Jinja
- Coordinates: 00°27′01″N 33°11′08″E
- Status: Operational
- Construction began: 1993
- Opening date: 2003
- Owner: Uganda Government
- Operator: Eskom Uganda Limited (Until 2022)

Dam and spillways
- Type of dam: Mass concrete
- Impounds: Victoria Nile
- Spillways: 3
- Spillway type: Radial

Reservoir
- Normal elevation: 1,134 m (3,720 ft)

Power Station
- Operator: Uganda Electricity Generation Company Limited
- Commission date: 2003
- Type: Run of the river
- Turbines: 5 x 40 MW (Kaplan)
- Installed capacity: 200 MW (270,000 hp)
- Website uegcl.go.ug

Kiira Hydroelectric Power Station is a hydroelectric power station in Uganda, with an installed capacity of 200 megawatts (270,000 hp).

== Location ==
The power station is located at Kimaka, a northern suburb of Jinja, in Jinja District, in the Eastern Region of Uganda, approximately 5.5 kilometres (3 mi) northwest of the central business district of the city of Jinja.

Kiira Power Station operates next to the Nalubaale Power Station at the point where the River Nile pours out of Lake Victoria, starting its 6,650 kilometres (4,130 mi) journey to the Mediterranean Sea. The coordinates of Kiira Hydroelectric Power Station are: 0°27'01.0"N, 33°11'08.0"E (Latitude:0.450272; Longitude:33.185558).

== History ==
In 1993, work started on the Nalubaale Power Station extension project. The new project is a second powerhouse located about 1 kilometre (0.62 mi) northeast of the Nalubaale Power Station, which was built in 1954. A new canal was cut to bring water from Lake Victoria to the new powerhouse. Major construction was completed in 1999. The first electricity generated from two units out of the installed five units, came online in 2000.

As of 2003, three of the five hydro power generators had been installed. Installation of the fifth and final turbine was completed in January 2007. Each unit at the extension has a capacity of 40 megawatts. During official opening ceremonies in 2003, the extension was named the "Kiira Power Station". Design and project management of the extension project was by Acres International (now part of Hatch Ltd), Canada.

== Operations ==
In 2002, the government of Uganda, through the Uganda Electricity Generation Company, a 100 percent parastatal, awarded a 20-year operational, management, and maintenance concession to Eskom Uganda Limited, a subsidiary of Eskom, the South African energy company, to cover both Kiira Power Station and nearby Nalubaale Power Station. Eskom sold the electricity it generated to the Uganda Electricity Transmission Company Limited (UETCL), the authorized single buyer. UETCL resold the power to Umeme, the energy distributor.

The 20-year concession with Eskom for both dams expired on 31 March 2023 and was not renewed. Effective 1 April 2023, Uganda Electricity Generation Company Limited (UEGCL) took over the management of the power stations and absorbed 93 percent of Eskom Uganda staff.

== Recent developments ==
In April 2021, the Daily Monitor newspaper reported that Eskom Uganda, the concessionaire for this dam had replaced the "electronic governor", which "controls the flow of water through the turbines". The system controls the rate of water flow and thus the amount of power output by the dam. This equipment was last replaced in 2007 and "had reached the end of its operational life".

The new equipment was manufactured and installed by Andrtiz Hydro GmbH and has a guaranteed life cycle of 15 years. The equipment cost USh5 billion (approx. US$1.4 million) (approx. €1.15 million), paid by Eskom Uganda.

== See also ==
- Njeru
- List of hydropower stations in Africa
- List of power stations in Uganda
