= Ripon Falls =

Waterfall in Uganda

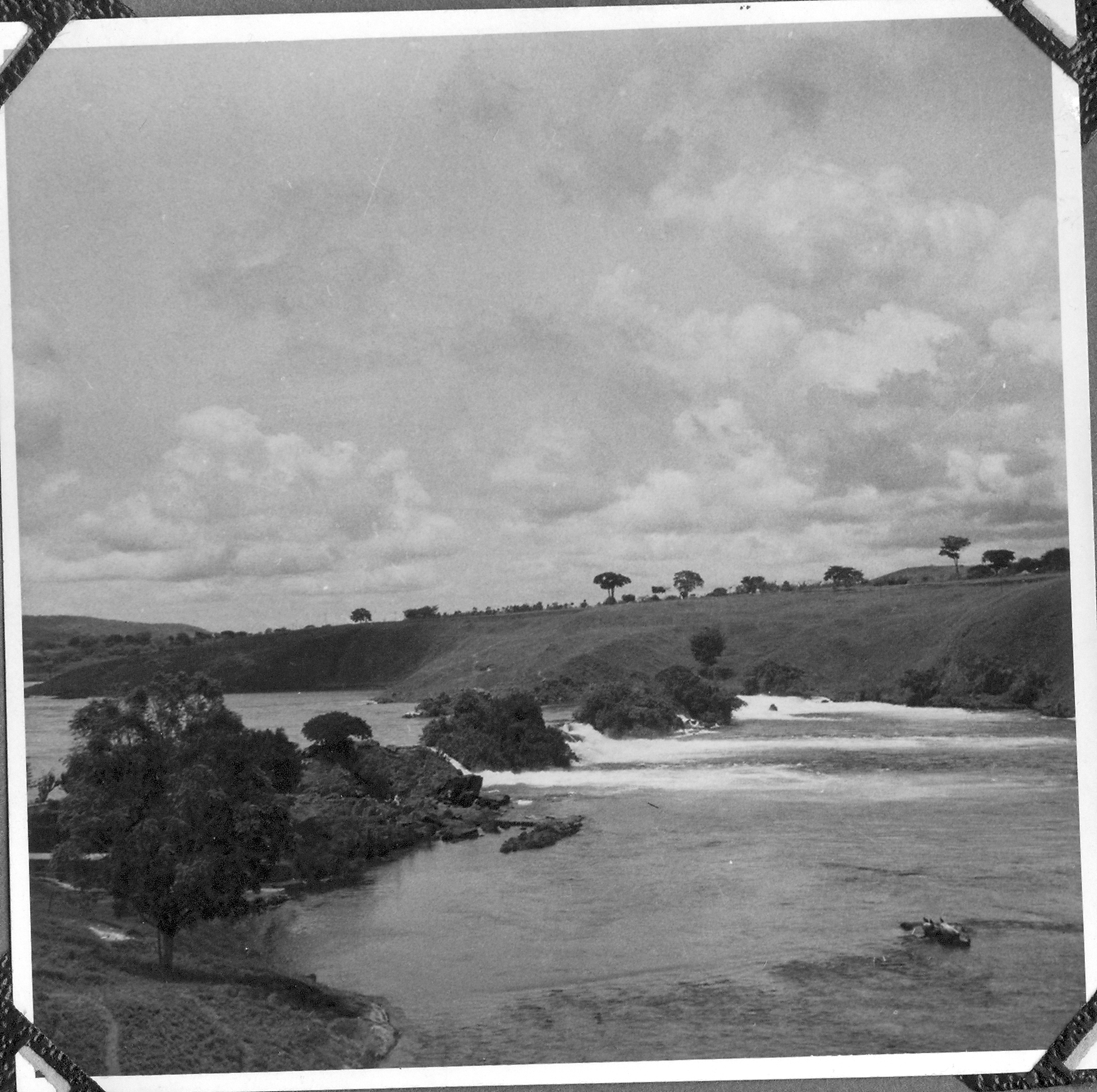
- Location: Jinja, Uganda
- Type: Submerged waterfall
- Total height: 5 m (16 ft)
- Total width: 275 m (902 ft)
- Watercourse: Victoria Nile

Ripon Falls were a series of waterfalls formerly located at the northern shore of Lake Victoria, near Jinja, in eastern Uganda. The falls marked the point where Lake Victoria drained into the Victoria Nile and were long regarded as the traditional source of the Nile River. Ripon Falls were submerged in the mid 20^{th} century following the construction of the Nalubaale Dam (Owen Falls Dam).

== Geography and location ==
Ripon Falls were situated at the northern outlet of Lake Victoria, near present day Jinja. The falls lay along the course of the Victoria Nile, which flows northward from Lake Victoria toward Lake Kyoga and eventually joins the White Nile.

== Historical significance ==
In the 19th century, Ripon Falls gained international recognition after being visited by British explorer John Hanning Speke in 1862. Speke identified the falls as the outlet of Lake Victoria and believed them to be the Nile's source. His findings contributed significantly to European understanding of the Nile geography.

The falls were named after George Robinson, 1st Marquess of Ripon, who served as President of the Royal Geographical Society between 1859 and 1860.

== Role as Lake Victoria's outlet ==
Before the construction of the Owen Falls Dam, Ripon Falls functioned as Lake Victoria's natural outflow, regulating water discharge into the Nile. The flow over the falls played an important role in maintaining downstream river levels and ecosystems.

== Submergence and Owen Falls Dam ==
Construction of the Owen Falls Dam began in the early 1950s and was completed in 1954. The dam widened Lake Victoria's outlet, permanently submerging Ripon Falls and expanding the lake's surface area. Additionally hydroelectric units were added in 1968.

The dam, locally known as Nalubaale Dam, is constructed of concrete and includes multiple sluice gates and turbines that regulate Lake Victoria's outflow. When fully opened, the sluices have a spill capacity of approximately 1,200 cubic meters per second.

== Tourism and recreation ==
Although Ripon Falls themselves no longer exist as visible natural feature, the surrounding area near Jinja has become a major center for tourism and recreation along the Nile River. Activities commonly associated with the area include white-water rafting, bungee jumping, quad biking, sport fishing, canoeing and kayaking, and nature photography.

== See also ==
- Owen Falls
- Murchison Falls
- Sipi Falls
- Nile
- Lake Victoria
- Nalubaale Hydroelectric Power Station
- John Hanning Speke
