= Eskom Uganda =

Ugandan energy generation company

Coordinates: 00°26′36″N 33°11′02″E

Eskom Uganda Limited
- Company type: Private company
- Industry: Energy industry
- Founded: 2002
- Headquarters: Jinja, Uganda
- Key people: Nokwanda Mngeni; CEO
- Services: Electricity
- Number of employees: 150 (2018)
- Website: www.eskom.co.ug

Eskom Uganda or Eskom Uganda Limited (EUL) is the largest generator of energy in Uganda and was incorporated in 2002 for a 20 year concession under a government regulatory framework.

== Location ==
EUL's headquarters are located outside the Nalubaale Hydroelectric Power Station in the town of Njeru, approximately 80 kilometres (50 mi), by road, east of Kampala, Uganda's capital and largest city. The geographical coordinates of Eskom Uganda Headquarters are: 0°26'36.0"N, 33°11'02.0"E (Latitude:0.443333; Longitude:33.183889).

== History ==
Following the dissolution of the erstwhile Uganda Electricity Board (UEB) in 2001, the electricity industry in the country was subdivided into four components as shown in the table below.

Products of dissolution of Uganda Electricity Board
| Number | Name of company | Role of new entity |
|---|---|---|
| 1 | Electricity Regulatory Authority | Independent industry regulator |
| 2 | Uganda Electricity Generation Company Limited | Generation of electric power |
| 3 | Uganda Electricity Transmission Company Limited | Bulk transmission of electricity above 33 kilovolts. Sole importer and exporter of electric power in Uganda. |
| 4 | Uganda Electricity Distribution Company Limited - leased to Umeme in 2005, for 20 years | Distribution of electric power in the country. Owns and maintains all network installations at and below 33 kiloVolts. |

EUL was formed in November 2002, following a successful bid to operate Nalubaale Power Station, the only existing power plant owned by the government at that time. Later, when the Kiira Hydroelectric Power Station came online in 2003, the Uganda Electricity Generation Company Limited contracted it to EUL as well.

== Operations ==
EUL is responsible for operating, maintaining and repairing two government-owned hydroelectric power stations. The older station, Nalubaale, which opened in 1954, has 10 generators with a capacity of 18 megawatts each. The newer station, Kiira, has five generators with a capacity of 40 megawatts each. The power generated is sold to the Uganda Electricity Transmission Company Limited (UETCL), the sole authorized bulk purchaser. UETCL in turn sells it to Umeme, the distributor, who in turn, sells it to end users.

== Ownership ==
Eskom Uganda Limited is a wholly owned subsidiary of Eskom, the South African energy conglomerate . Although fully owned by the South African parent company, EUL is allowed to exercise a wide degree of autonomy. Its chief executive officer reports directly to the board of Eskom Holdings Limited.

| Rank | Name of owner | Percentage ownership |
|---|---|---|
| 1 | Eskom | 100 |
| | Total | 100.00 |

== See also ==
- List of power stations in Uganda
- West Nile Rural Electrification Company
