= Yala Swamp =

Kenya's largest freshwater wetland

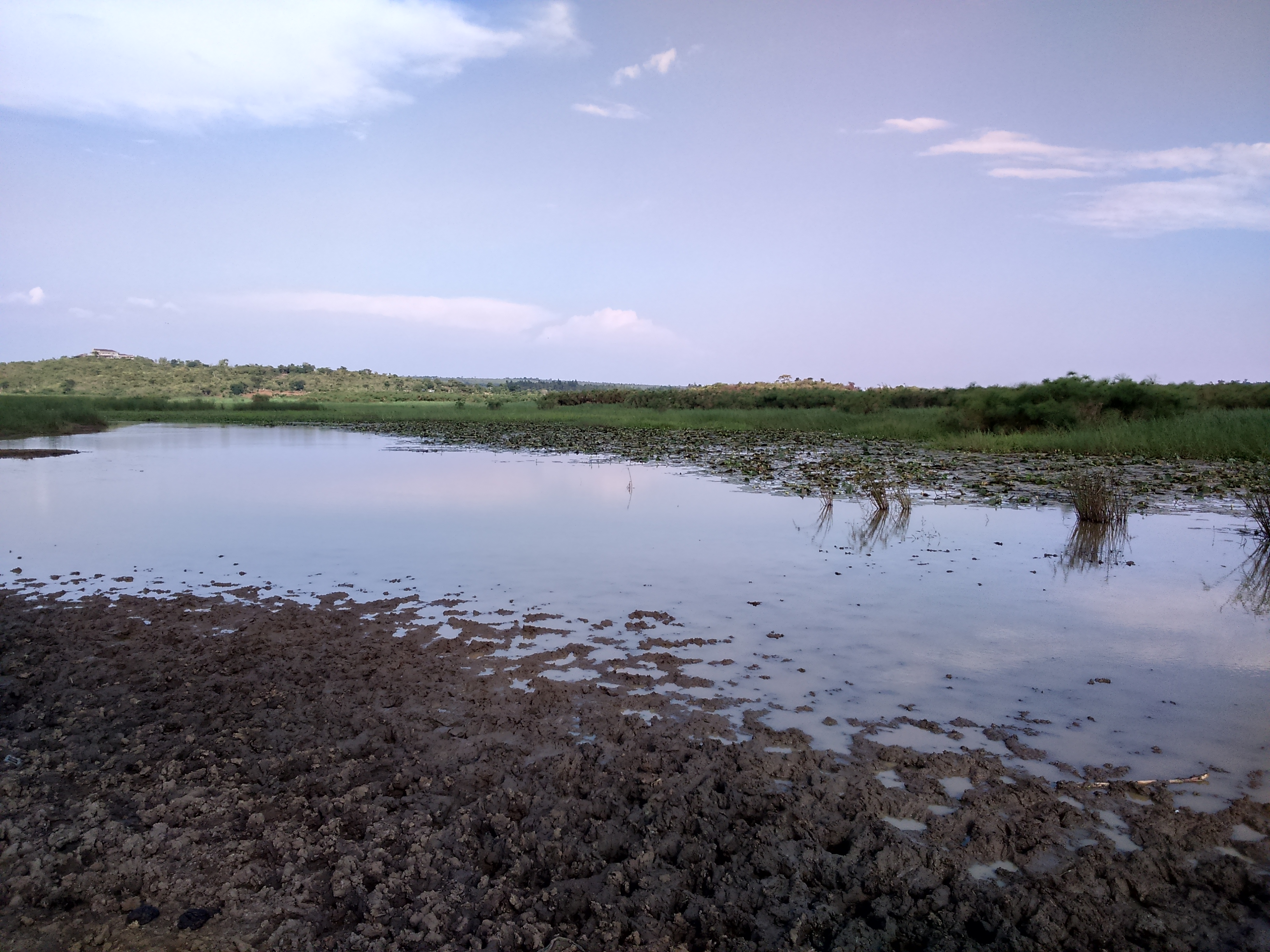
- Egyptian white lotus (Nymphaea lotus) on the north shore of Yala Swamp in Bar Olengo

- Location within Kenya
- Location: Yala Swamp, Kenya
- Coordinates: 0.038°N 34.082°E
- River sources: Yala River, Nzoia River
- Basin countries: Kenya, Uganda
- Surface area: 175 square kilometres (68 sq mi)

The Yala Swamp is Kenya's largest freshwater wetland, covering about 175 square kilometres (68 sq mi) in Western Kenya and it is recognized as a Key Biodiversity Area.

== Location ==
The Yala Swamp at the mouth of the Yala River covers about 175 square kilometres (68 sq mi) along the northeastern shore of Lake Victoria. The swamp contains the 1,500 hectares (3,700 acres) Lake Kanyaboli, a freshwater deltaic wetland with an average depth of 3 metres (9.8 ft), which is fed by the floodwaters of the Nzoia and Yala rivers and by the backflow of water from Lake Victoria. The wetland is in Siaya and Busia counties in Kenya. It acts as a filter for waters that flow into Lake Victoria from two major rivers, the Yala River and Nzoia River. It is sometimes considered the source of the Nile.

In the past the Yala River flowed through the eastern 20% of the Yala Swamp into Lake Kanyaboli, then into the main swamp, and then through a small gulf into Lake Victoria. Today the eastern part of the swamp has been drained, and the river flows directly into the 8,000 hectares (20,000 acres) main swamp. It is cut off from Lake Kanyaboli by a silt-clay dyke. Lake Kanyaboli now receives its water from the surrounding catchment area and from back-seepage from the swamp. The river's gulf has been cut off from the lake by a culvert, which created the 500 hectares (1,200 acres) Lake Sare through back-flooding.

== Ecology ==
The swamps harbour endangered fish species Oreochromis esculentus and Oreochromis variabilis that have disappeared from Lake Victoria itself. The Sitatunga antelope (Tragecephalus spekii) still lives in the swamps’ papyrus. BirdLife International classifies the Yala Swamp among Kenya’s 60 Important Bird Areas. Some of the birds that live there are the blue-breasted bee-eater, the papyrus gonolek, the swamp flycatcher, the papyrus canary, the white-winged swamp warbler and the Baillon's crake.

A 2005 report noted changes in Lake Sare that threatened the lake ecosystem through eutrophication and pollution. It recommended an inclusive management plan for the Yala swamp complex to prevent further degradation of the ecosystem. As of 2019 BirdLife International scored the threat to the swamp complex as high, and was pessimistic about action being taken.

== Sources ==
- Gichuki, John; Maithya, Jacob; Masai, D. M. (September 2005), Recent ecological changes in of Lake Sare, western Kenya, Kenya Marine and Fisheries Research Institute
- Okuna, Patience (2019), Threats to the survival of river Yala in Kenya, Munich: GRIN Verlag
- Lake Kanyaboli – Kenya, Global Nature Fund, archived from the original on 2021-01-24
- Yala Swamp Complex, BirdLife International
