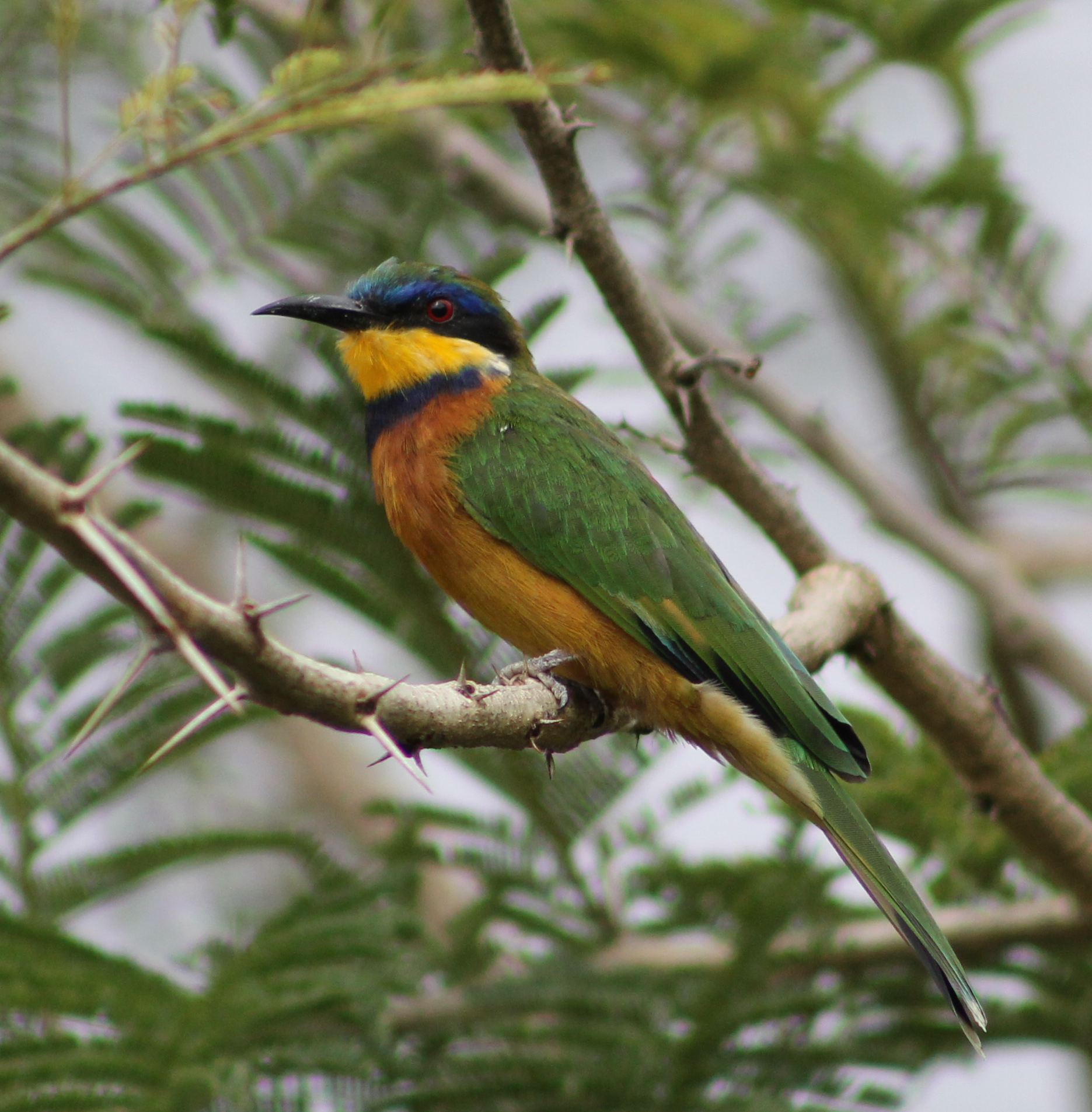

Conservation status
- Least Concern (IUCN 3.1)

Scientific classification
- Kingdom: Animalia
- Phylum: Chordata
- Class: Aves
- Order: Coraciiformes
- Family: Meropidae
- Genus: Merops
- Species: M. lafresnayii

Binomial name
- Merops lafresnayii Guérin-Méneville, 1843

= Ethiopian bee-eater =

Species of bird

The Ethiopian bee-eater (Merops lafresnayii) is a species of bird in the family Meropidae. It is found in Ethiopia and Sudan. It was formerly considered a subspecies of either blue-breasted bee-eater M. variegatus or cinnamon-chested bee-eater M. oreobates, from both of which it is allopatric with a separate distribution.

The Ethiopian bee-eater is a bird of open montane woodland (including coffee and eucalyptus plantations), occurring at 1,000–3,200 metres (3,300–10,500 ft) altitude, often on steep slopes, but also on flatter land on the Ethiopian plateau. Like its two relatives, it is usually solitary or in pairs, not gregarious like many other bee-eaters. It perches on a branch in the canopy beside tracks and clearings and swoops down on small butterflies, bees, and other insects before returning to its original or another perch.

== Taxonomy ==
Ethiopian bee-eater is one of a group of African species that have sometimes been classified in a separate genus Mellitophagus, distinguished by small size, rounded wingtips, lack of tail streamers, and non-colonial behaviour. The other species in this group are blue-breasted bee-eater M. variegatus, cinnamon-chested bee-eater M. oreobates, little bee-eater M. pusillus, and sometimes also red-throated bee-eater M. bulocki and white-fronted bee-eater M. bullockoides, though those last two appear less close to the others.

== Description ==
At around 21 cm long, it is slightly larger than blue-breasted bee-eater but similar in size to cinnamon-chested bee-eater, and generally similar to both in plumage. The feathers on the back and crown are olive-green, with russet-orange underparts. The throat is yellow, with a narrow white border. The chest has a dark blue band, broadest at the centre, just below the yellow throat. There is also a narrow blue band just above the bill and back to behind the eyes, above a broad black eyestripe. The tail is square-ended, lacking the long central pin feathers of many bee-eaters; it has olive-green central feathers, while the outer tail feathers have a yellow-orange basal half and a blackish distal half; all the tail feathers are narrowly tipped pale. In flight, a black stripe and additional russet feathers can be viewed beneath their back and along the underside of their wings. From above, the wing is olive-green on the covert feathers, with the flight feathers tawny-yellow with a broad black tips forming a black stripe along the back of the wings.

== Status ==
Though its species distribution is fairly well documented, very little information is known about the mating patterns of the Ethiopian bee-eater. Its habitat largely consists of places of medium to high humidity, where heavy rainfall persists throughout the year, mainly within the rainforests that make up a large portion of south-western Ethiopia and parts of Sudan. Though the exact population size is unknown, its numbers remain stable, and there are no known threats of environmental conservation. Thus, the population trend of the species meets the criterion of being labeled Least Concern by the International Union for Conservation of Nature and Natural Resources (IUCN).

== Diet ==
The Ethiopian bee-eater is insectivorous, and its diet largely consists of flying insects such as butterflies, dragonflies, moths, large beetles, and bees. The Ethiopian bee-eater primarily uses two hunting methods. It either darts swiftly between the shrubs and low branches of trees to seize insects, or descends at a slow, even pace from its roost, hovering in the air momentarily before snatching its prey.
