= List of lakes of Kenya =

This is a list of lakes of Kenya.

== B ==
- Baringo
- Bogoria

== C ==
- Chew Bahir

== E ==
- Elmenteita

== K ==
- Kamnarok
- Kanyaboli
- Kesses Dam

== L ==
- Logipi

== M ==
- Magadi

== N ==
- Naivasha
- Nakuru

== T ==
- Turkana

== V ==
- Victoria
