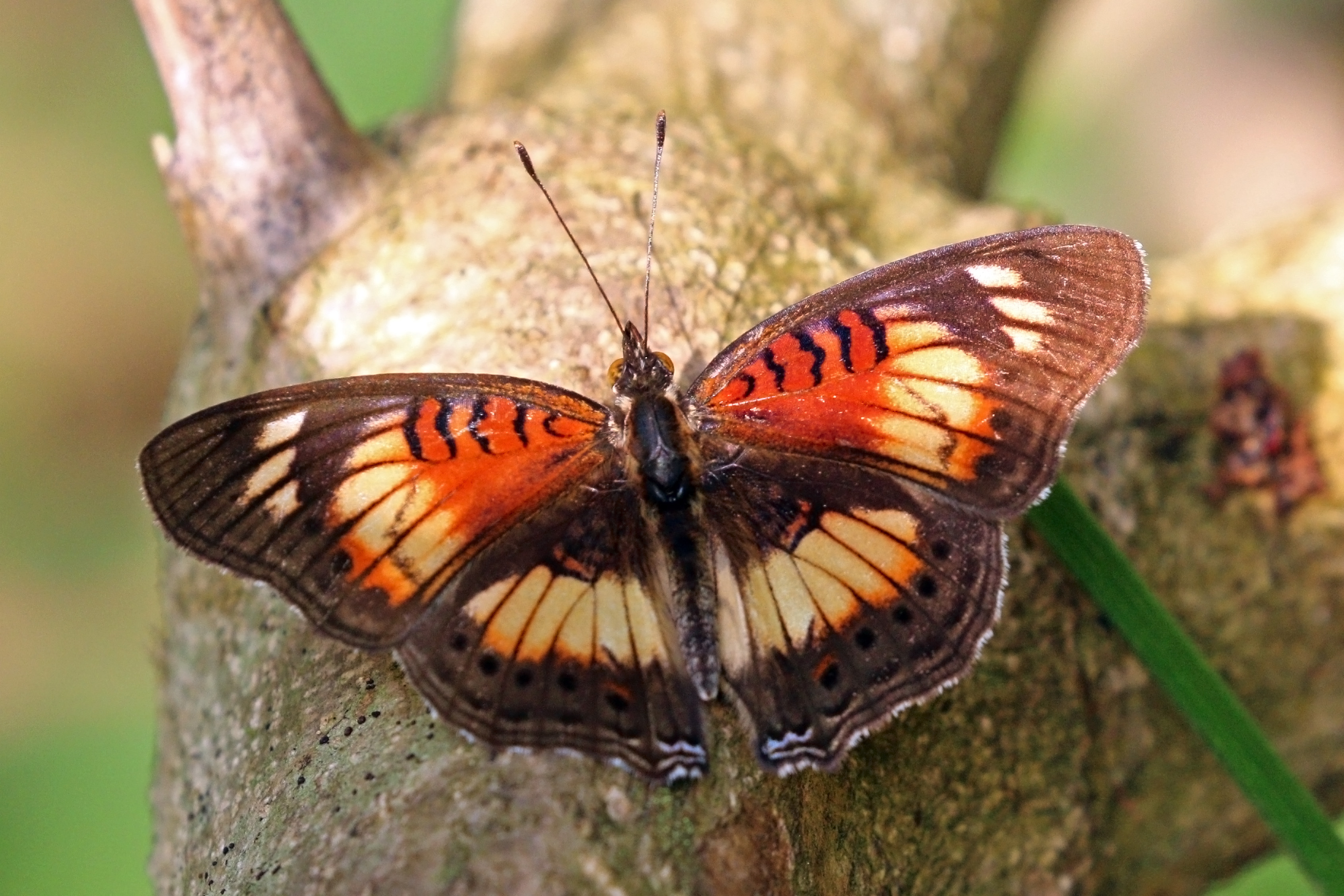
- J. s. infracta male dark form, Kakamega Forest, Kenya

Scientific classification
- Kingdom: Animalia
- Phylum: Arthropoda
- Clade: Pancrustacea
- Class: Insecta
- Order: Lepidoptera
- Family: Nymphalidae
- Genus: Junonia
- Species: J. sophia

Binomial name
- Junonia sophia (Fabricius, 1793)

Synonyms
- Papilio sophia Fabricius, 1793; Precis sophia ab. ferenigra Schultze, 1920; Junonia infracta Butler, 1888; Precis sophia albida Suffert, 1904; Precis sophia ab. leucotincta Strand, 1911; Precis sophia f. nigeria Stoneham, 1934

= Junonia sophia =

Species of butterfly

Junonia sophia, the little commodore or little pansy, is a butterfly in the family Nymphalidae. It is found in Senegal, the Gambia, Guinea-Bissau, Guinea, Sierra Leone, Liberia, Ivory Coast, Burkina Faso, Ghana, Togo, Nigeria, Cameroon, Angola, the Democratic Republic of the Congo, Uganda, Rwanda, Burundi, Kenya, Ethiopia, Tanzania, Malawi, and Zambia. The habitat consists of forests and savanna.

The larvae feed on Paulowilhelmia sclerochiton, Hypoestes verticillaris, Brillantaisa lamium, Sclerochiton paulowilhelmina, Asystasia, Barleria, Justicia, and Ruellia species.

== Subspecies ==
- Junonia sophia sophia — Senegal, the Gambia, Guinea-Bissau, Guinea, Sierra Leone, Liberia, Ivory Coast, Burkina Faso, Ghana, Togo, Nigeria, Cameroon
- Junonia sophia infracta Butler, 1888 — Angola, Democratic Republic of the Congo, eastern Uganda, Rwanda, Burundi, western and central Kenya, Ethiopia, Tanzania, Malawi, northern Zambia

Torben Larsen developed a species numbering system for his 2005 publication Butterflies of West Africa. The nominate subspecies is #19. The 'Larsen' numbers have since been used with permission in A Sharp Eye on Butterflies of Ghana.

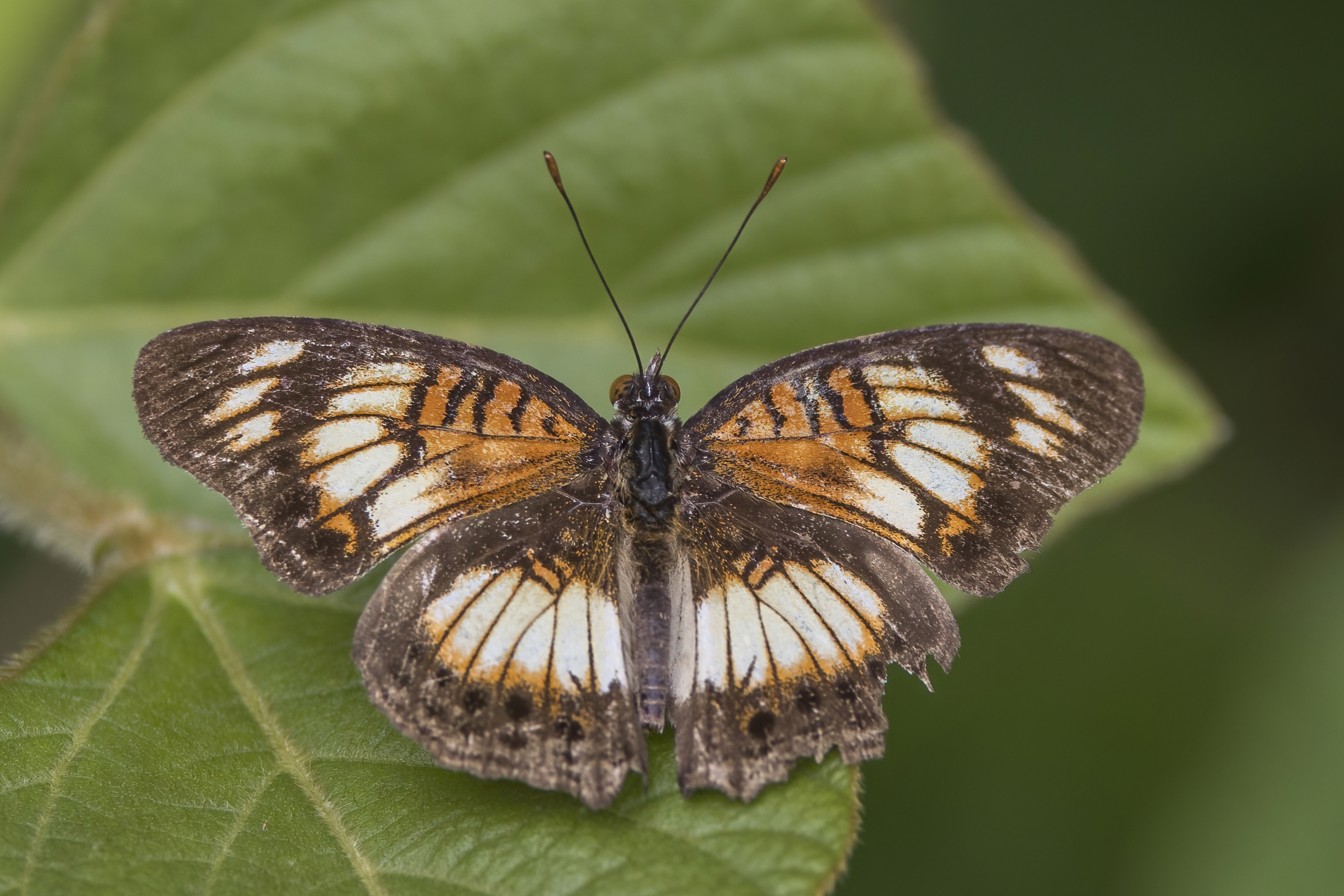
male J. s. sophia
Ghana

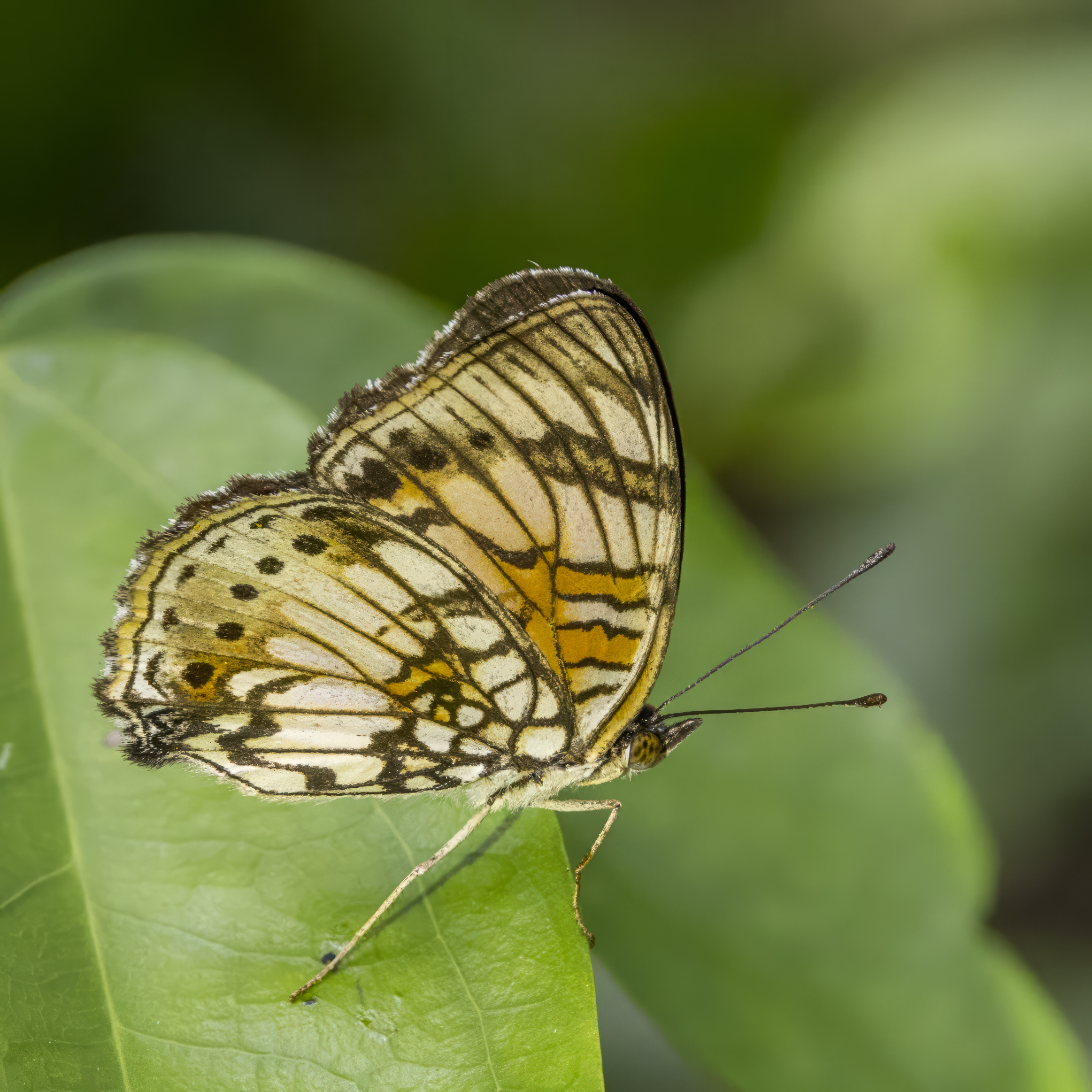
J. s. sophia
Ghana

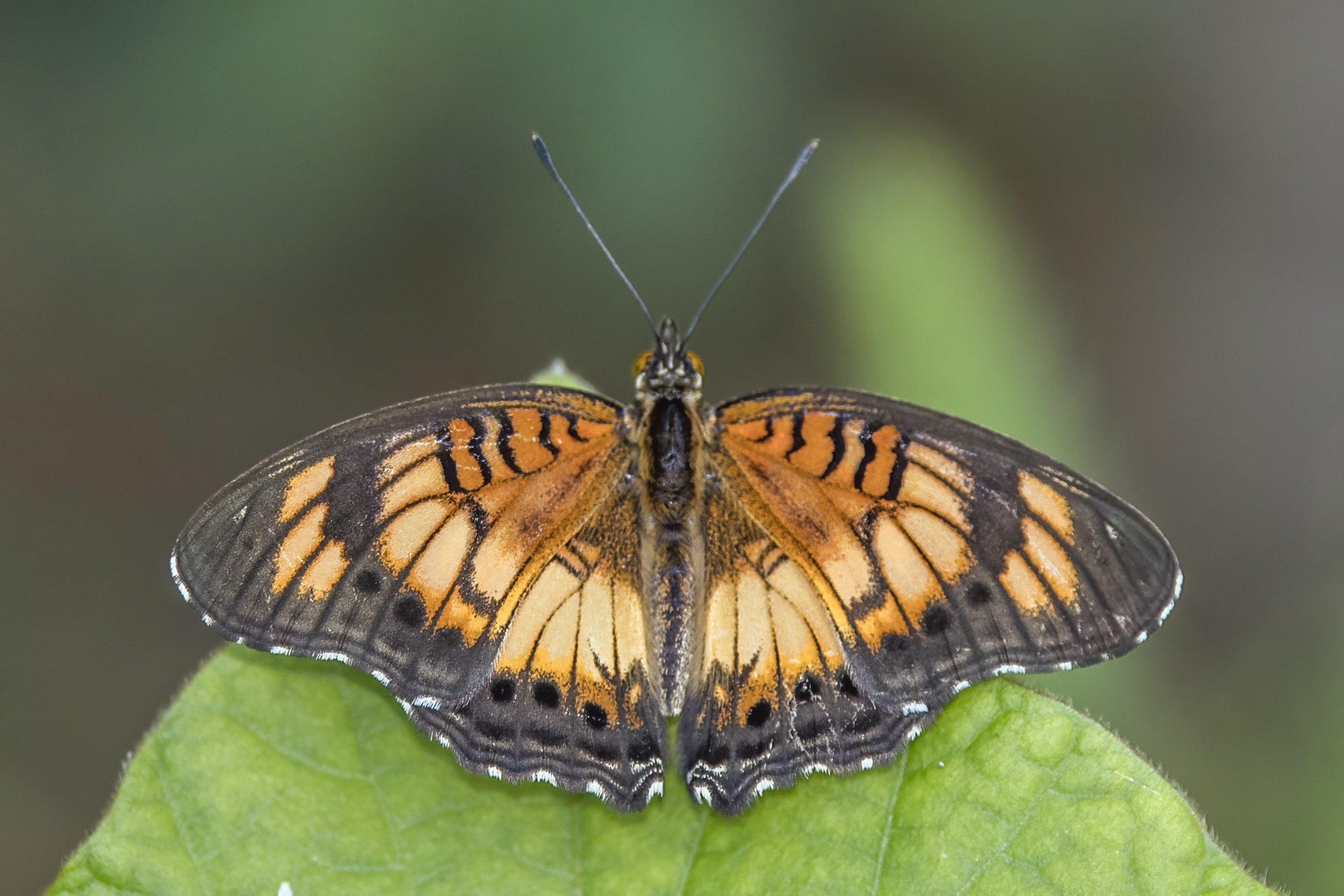
Female J. s. sophia
Ghana

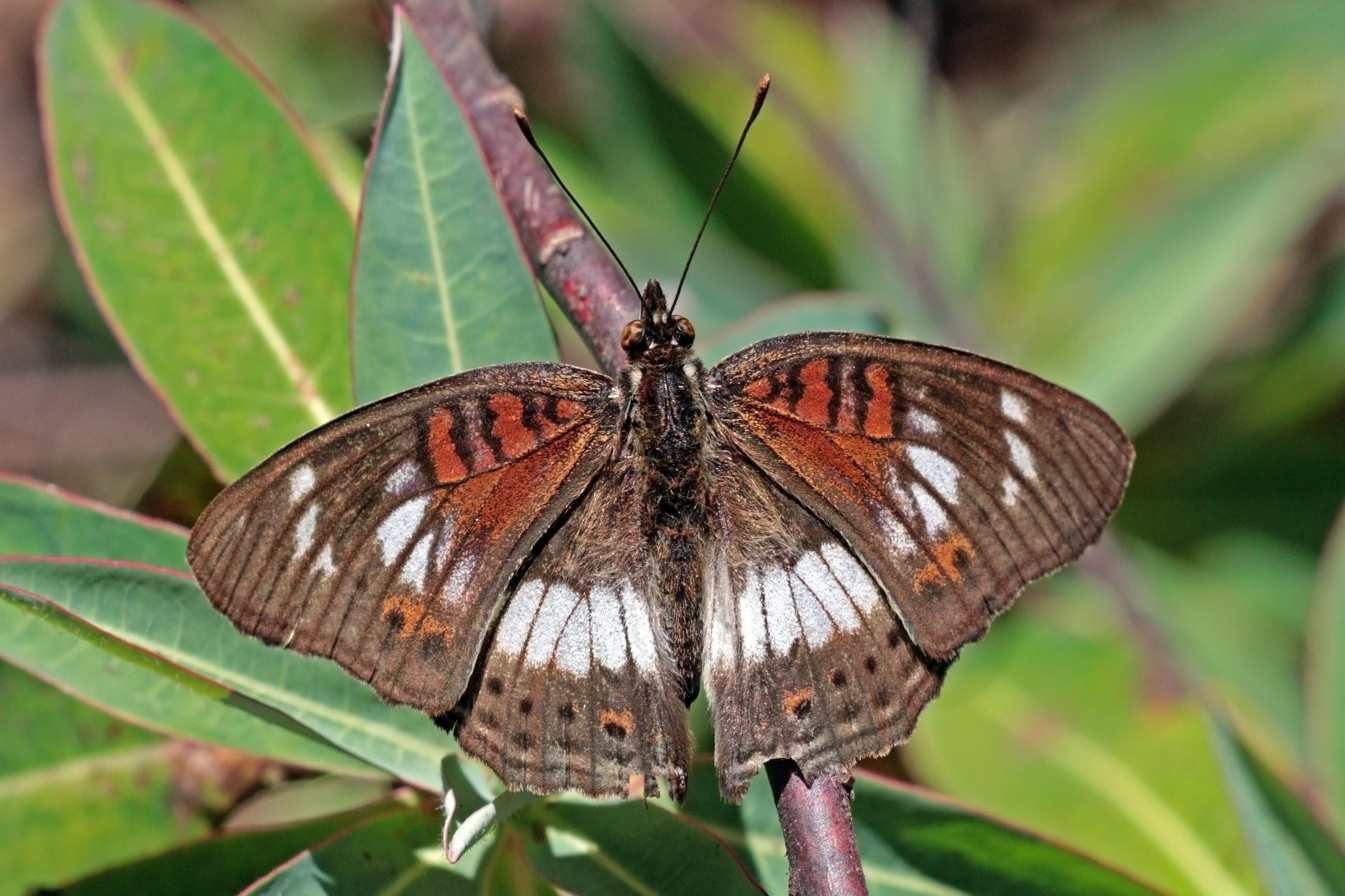
J. s. infracta, male white form
Harenna Forest, Ethiopia

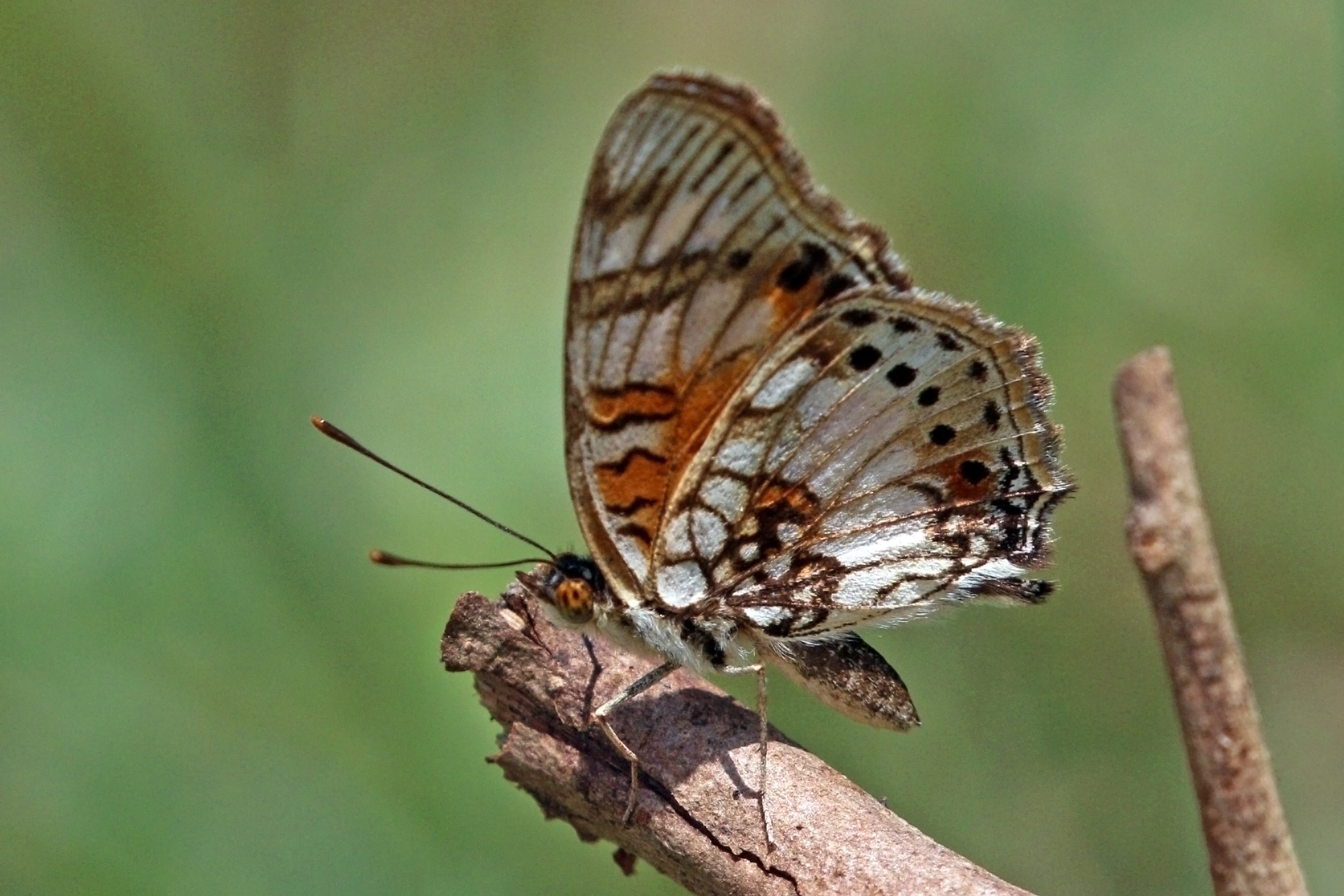
J. s. infracta, white form
Kakamega Forest, Kenya

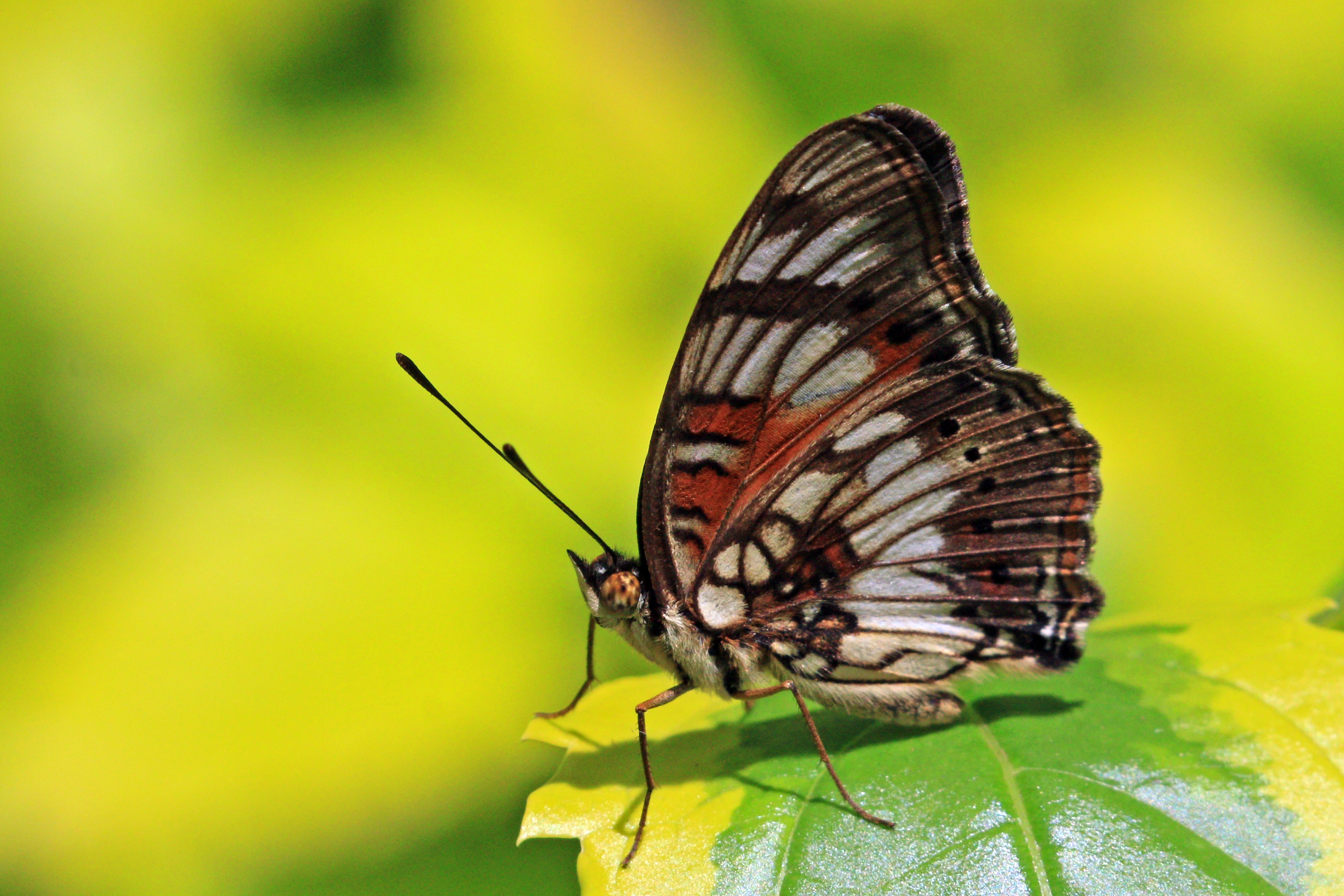
J. s. infracta, dark form
Kakamega Forest, Kenya
