= Yala River =

River in Kenya

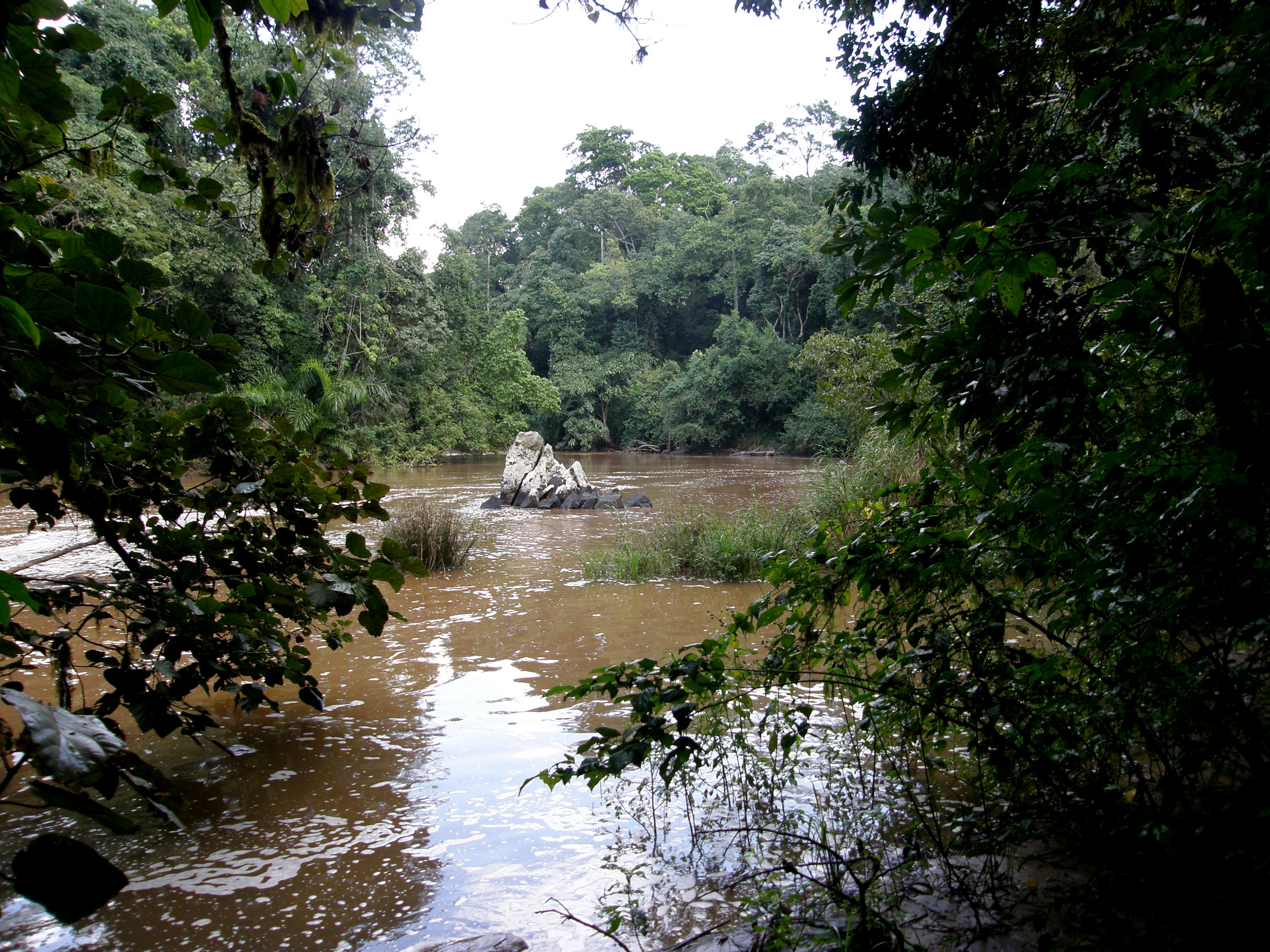
- Yala river within Kakamega rainforest, western Kenya

- Mouth location

Location
- Country: Kenya

Physical characteristics
- Mouth: Lake Victoria
  - coordinates: 0.060998°S 34.042633°E
- Length: 219 kilometres (136 mi)
- Basin size: 3,351 square kilometres (1,294 sq mi)

The Yala River is a river in western Kenya, a tributary of Lake Victoria. It generally flows fast over a rocky bed through a wide valley before joining the Nzoia River to form the Yala Swamp on the border of Lake Victoria. The land along its course is mostly cultivated or used for grazing, with relatively few remnants of the original forest. Soil erosion is visible throughout the river basin, particularly in the lower parts. Projects are underway to exploit the river for hydroelectricity.

== Course ==
The Yala River rises in the Nandi Escarpment in the Rift Valley Province, Kenya. It flows west for 219 kilometres (136 mi) to its mouth on Lake Victoria in Siaya County, Kenya. It is one of the largest Kenyan rivers feeding Lake Victoria, with an average discharge of 27.4 cubic metres per second (970 cu ft/s). The river contributes about 5% of the annual inflow to Lake Victoria.

The Yala River flows through a wide, mature valley that appears to have been rejuvenated during the tilting associated with the rifting movements of the mid-Pleistocene. It runs swiftly over a rocky bed, with a notable absence of alluvial flats and terraces. The main channel is about 30 metres (98 ft) wide, apart from the Yala Swamp. The river runs through the southeast of the Kakamega Forest, where it has a dramatic 20-metre (66 ft) waterfall.

The Yala Swamp at the mouth of the river covers about 175 square kilometres (68 sq mi) along the northern shore of Lake Victoria. The swamp contains 15 square kilometres (5.8 sq mi) Lake Kanyaboli, a freshwater deltaic wetland with an average depth of 3 metres (9.8 ft), which is fed by the floodwaters of the Nzoia and Yala rivers and by the backflow of water from Lake Victoria. The lake provides a refuge for several species of fish that are no longer present in Lake Victoria.

In the past the Yala River flowed through the eastern 20% of the Yala Swamp into Lake Kanyaboli, then into the main swamp, and then through a small gulf into Lake Victoria. Today the eastern part of the swamp has been drained, and the river flows directly into the 80 square kilometres (31 sq mi) main swamp. It is cut off from Lake Kanyaboli by a silt-clay dyke. Lake Kanyaboli now receives its water from the surrounding catchment area and from back-seepage from the swamp. The river's gulf has been cut off from the lake by a culvert, which created the 5 square kilometres (1.9 sq mi) Lake Sare through back-flooding. Lake Sare, with its direct link to Lake Victoria, is important in preserving the cichlid fish fauna of Lake Victoria. The river water enters Lake Victoria from Lake Sare through a channel crossed by a bridge that carries the C27 coastal highway along the Goye causeway.

== Basin ==
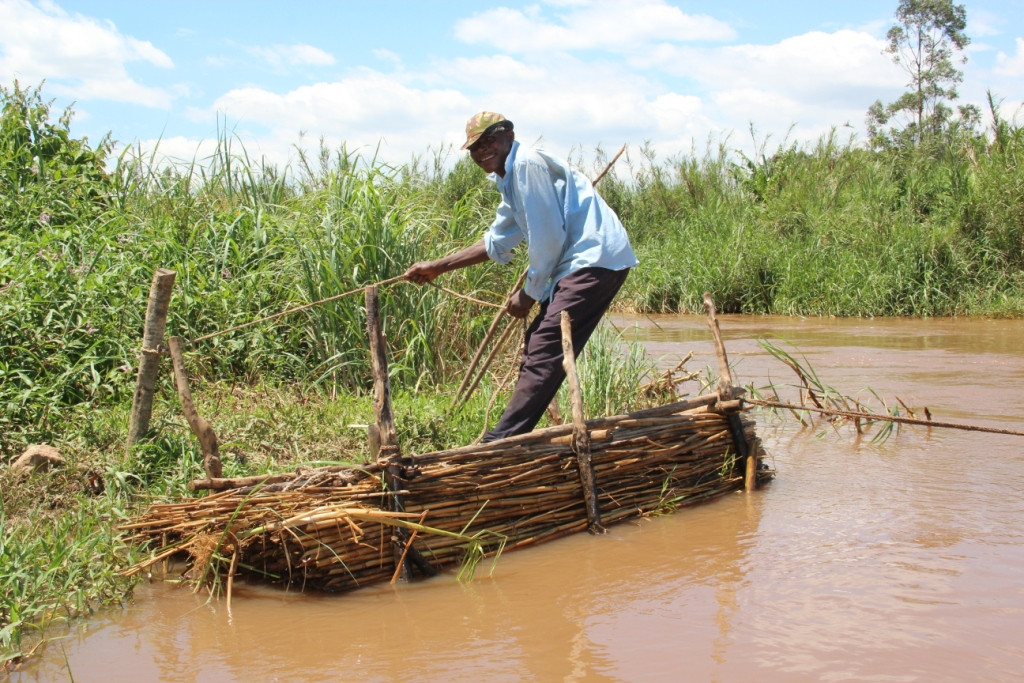
Handmade raft on the river

The Yala River drainage basin covers 3,351 square kilometres (1,294 sq mi). An ecosystem management study of the Yala and Nzoia river basins issued a baseline report in 2008. It studied three representative 100 square kilometres (39 sq mi) blocks of land in the Yala basin. In all three blocks much of the land was cultivated. Subsistence crops included maize, beans, sorghum, banana, cassava and sweet potato, while cash crops included tea, wheat and mango.

The Upper Yala Block in the Uasin Gishu District includes Lake Lessos, one of the Yala River's main sources. The block has level terrain with medium gradient hills with shallow depressions. There are wetlands and small permanent streams. The farms are large and there is little subsistence agriculture. The cultivated land is interspersed with grasslands. Dairy production is important. 22% of the plots showed soil erosion in 2008.

The Middle Yala Block in Vihiga District and Kakamega District contains mountainous highlands with many small streams, and held clusters of wetlands. There are preserved remnants of forest throughout the block used for cultural purposes, and logging in the Kaimosi forest in the southeast of the block. Most of the farms are overcropped, without traditional rotation and fallow periods. The farms are managed better in the north of the block, with more trees and hedges, while in the southern part steep slopes are cultivated with no conservation measures. About half the block shows evidence of soil erosion.

The Lower Yala block in Kisumu District and Siaya District has low to medium gradient terrain with a few large hills. Most of the population are Luo, but in some areas the people are mainly Luhya. About 43% of the land is used for crops, and 55% for grazing livestock. Livestock includes cows, bulls, chickens, goats and sheep. There are few trees, and widespread soil erosion.

== Hydroelectric projects ==
As of 2016 a feasibility study had been completed for development of the Nandi Forest dam to support irrigation, water supply and power generation. The power plant would have two 25 MW Pelton turbines and would supply 185 GWh annually. In April 2020 it was announced that Tembo Power of Mauritius, along with Metier and WK Construction of South Africa had signed an agreement for development of a run-of-the-river hydroelectricity plant on the Yala River. The Kaptis Hydroelectric Power Station was to have a 15MW capacity and would be operational by 2022. The project would cost $30 million. The electricity would be fed to the grid operated by the state-owned Kenya Power and Lighting Company (KPLC). The power plant was to be located near the town of Kakamega.

== Ecological changes ==
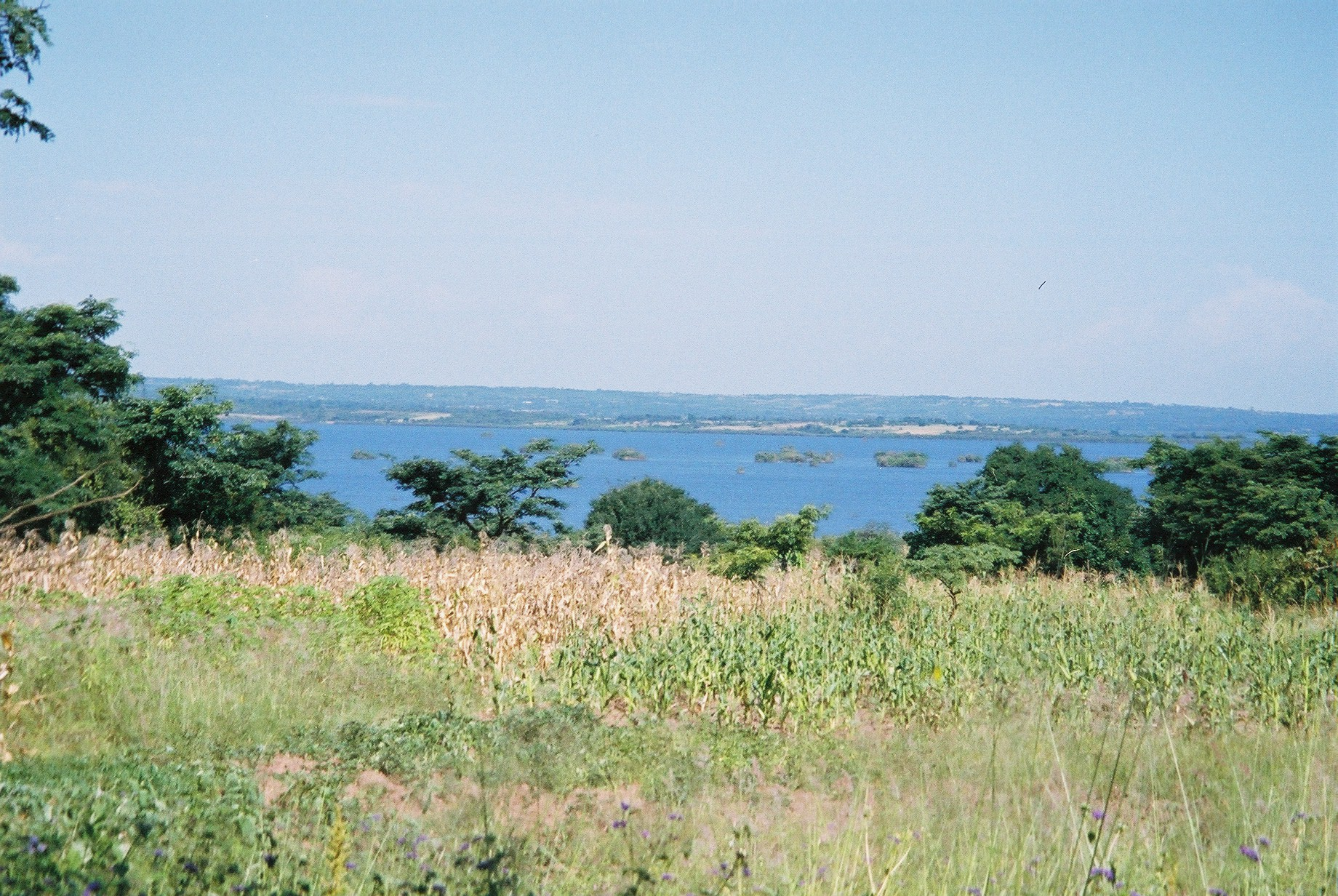
Lake Kanyaboli

A study of discharge data from 1950 to 2000 showed a general increase in discharge. This may be due to destruction of land cover, including indigenous forests. Yearly discharge of nutrients into the lake is about 1,000 tonnes of nitrogen and 102 tonnes of phosphorus. Threats to the river ecology include garbage from panning for minerals, oil spills in and near the river, deforestation and resulting river bank erosion, and sand extraction. Development potential includes irrigation and drainage projects in the lower and middle parts of the basin, hydroelectricity, wetlands products, eco-tourism and water sports tourism, and perhaps carbon sequestration.

Conversion of the wetlands for crop production must be carefully managed to ensure environmental sustainability. Sufficient wetlands must be maintained to control erosion and improve water quality, which in turn affects fisheries in the river and the adjacent lake. The watershed must also be rehabilitated to maintain farm productivity and to reduce erosion and sedimentation of the wetlands and river. A 2005 report noted changes in Lake Sare that threatened the lake ecosystem through eutrophication and pollution. It recommended an inclusive management plan for the Yala swamp complex to prevent further degradation of the ecosystem. As of 2019 BirdLife International scored the threat to the swamp complex as high, and was pessimistic about action being taken.

== Sources ==
- Boye, Anja; Verchot, Louis; Zomer, Robert (5 March 2008), Baseline Report Yala and Nzoia River Basins (PDF) (Western Kenya Integrated Ecosystem Management Project: Findings from the Baseline Surveys), Nairobi, Kenya: International Centre for Research in Agorforestry
- Creamer, Terence (16 April 2020), "Debt funders appointed for 15 MW Kenya hydropower project", Engineering News
- Gichuki, John; Maithya, Jacob; Masai, D. M. (September 2005), Recent ecological changes in of Lake Sare, western Kenya, Kenya Marine and Fisheries Research Institute
- Identification of a multipurpose water resources development project in the Yala River basin in Kenya, FCG Kenya
- "Kenya: Tembo Power to develop first hydro project with Metier", African Energy, 17 April 2020
- Lahmeyer International GmbH (May 2016), Development of a Power Generation and Transmission Master Plan, Kenya
- Lake Kanyaboli – Kenya, Global Nature Fund, archived from the original on 2021-01-24
- Mwangi, Peter; Chege, David (December 2019), Environmental and Social Impact Assessment Study Report for the Proposed Kakamega Forest Conservation Fence Project (PDF), Kenya Wildlife Service
- Okuna, Patience (2019), Threats to the survival of river Yala in Kenya, Munich: GRIN Verlag
- Ominde, Simeon Hongo (1971-01-01), Studies in East African Geography and Development, University of California Press, ISBN 978-0-520-02073-3
- "Relation: Yala (8873639)", OpenStreetMap
- Sangale, Felix; Okungu, John; Opango, Peterlis (2011), Variation of flow of water from Rivers Nzoia, Yala and Sio into Lake Victoria (PDF), Ministry of Environment and Natural Resources
- Takouleu, Jean-Marie (20 April 2020), "KENYA: EAIF and Finnfund finance 15 MW Kaptis Hydroelectric Project", Afrik21
- Yala Swamp Complex, BirdLife International
