= Lake Sare =

Lake in Kenya

- Location within Kenya
- Location: Yala Swamp, Kenya
- Coordinates: 0.042°S 34.059°E
- River sources: Yala River
- Basin countries: Kenya, Uganda

Lake Sare is a lake in western Kenya that lies between the Yala Swamp and Lake Victoria. It has potential as a site for restocking fish species that have become endangered in Lake Victoria, but due to lack of management the lake ecology is steadily degrading.

== Location ==
Lake Sare was originally a gulf on Lake Victoria at the mouth of the Yala River where it left the Yala Swamp. The gulf has been cut off from the lake by a culvert, which created the 500 hectares (1,200 acres) Lake Sare through back-flooding. The river water enters Lake Victoria from Lake Sare through a channel crossed by a bridge that carries the C27 coastal highway along the Goye causeway.

Lake Sare is bordered by papyrus swamps, which merge into the Yala Swamp. The lake does not support commercial fishery due to lack of management, although that could change. With its direct link to Lake Victoria, it is important in preserving the cichlid fish fauna of Lake Victoria. It has potential as a site for juvenile endangered species of fish to grow before migrating into Lake Victoria.

== Ecology ==
A 1991 report stated that the water that flows into Lake Sare has been filtered by the swamp and holds few nutrients and little suspended matter. The water has conductivity of 120–130μS/cm and pH of 7.6, with 7–9 mg of oxygen per liter in daytime. The bottom zone was mulched with papyrus detritus, with few areas of soil or gravel. It was home to burrowing nematodes, mayfly nymphs, dragonfly nymphs and swamp oligochaeta, particularly Alma emini and Limnodrilus species. The lake was not very productive in terms of limnology, with much lower densities of phytoplankton and zooplankton in the free water column when compared to Lake Victoria.

The lake did not have a rich variety of fish species. The most common were Nile tilapia (Oreochromis niloticus), Oreochromis leucostictus and Haplochromis species. The swamp around the lake held marbled lungfish (Protopterus aethiopicus), Lake Victoria squeaker (Synodontis victoriae), Synodontis afrofischeri and Clarias gariepinus. The carnivorous Nile perch (Lates niloticus infested the lake. Due in part to the Nile perch and in part to over-fishing by the local people, there were no Oreochromis esculentus or Oreochromis variabilis in the lake.

A 2005 report noted changes in Lake Sare that threatened its ecosystem through eutrophication and pollution. It recommended an inclusive management plan for the entire Yala swamp complex to prevent further degradation of the ecosystem. A 2014 report noted significant degradation of the lake's ecology in the past 24 years. Noxious macrophytes had invaded the lake initiating a slow change that could cause it to eventually dry up. As of 2019 BirdLife International scored the threat to the whole swamp complex as high, and was pessimistic about action being taken.

== Sources ==
- Gichuki, John; Maithya, Jacob; Masai, D. M. (September 2005), Recent ecological changes in of Lake Sare, western Kenya, Kenya Marine and Fisheries Research Institute
- "Lake Sare" (PDF), The County of Diverse Lakes, Siaya County
- Maithya, Jacob; Abila, R. (2014), Ecological Evolution of Lake Sare: The Need to Develop and Manage Fisheries Resources of the Small Water Bodies In Kenya, Maasai Mara University
- Njuguna, Steven G.; Howard, Geoffrey W. (1992), Wetlands of Kenya (Proceedings of the KWWG Seminar on Wetlands of Kenya, National Museums of Kenya, Nairobi, Kenya, 3-5 July 1991), IUCN, ISBN 978-2-8317-0127-1
- "Relation: Yala (8873639)", OpenStreetMap
- Yala Swamp Complex, BirdLife International
