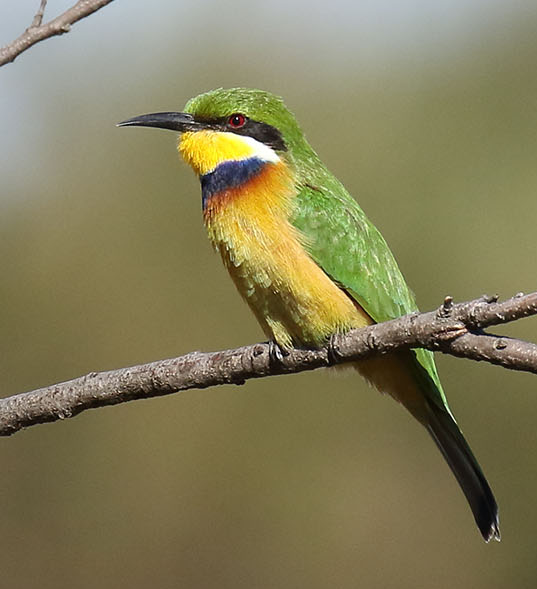

Conservation status
- Least Concern (IUCN 3.1)

Scientific classification
- Kingdom: Animalia
- Phylum: Chordata
- Class: Aves
- Order: Coraciiformes
- Family: Meropidae
- Genus: Merops
- Species: M. variegatus

Binomial name
- Merops variegatus Vieillot, 1817

= Blue-breasted bee-eater =

Species of bird

The blue-breasted bee-eater (Merops variegatus) is a central African species of bird. It is a member of the family Meropidae. Meropids are all visually similar and have a diet specialized in Hymenopterans.

== Description ==
The blue-breasted bee-eater, Merops variegatus, exhibits several physically defining characteristics of the Meropidae. It has a relatively large head, short neck, bright plumage, long curved slim sharp beak and a broad black eyestripe. M. variegatus weights between 20 and 26 g and measures between 18 and 21 cm in length. It is primarily a green bird, with a green crown, green upper parts and light greenish-yellow underparts.

Primary wings are washed with rufous and secondaries are green with black tips. Overall the wings are rounded at the tip compared to the pointed tips of the migratory species in Meropidae. The tail has twelve rectrices, the outer rectrices are washed with rufous and the center feathers are green. The tail has a subterminal black bar and is tipped with white. Furthermore, the tail has a shallow v -shape and is lacking tail-streamers present in other members of the family.

The head of the blue-breasted bee-eater can be distinguished from other members of the family by a combination of characteristics. It has a blue stripe over the black eye stripe, an orange-red iris, a white cheek and a bright yellow throat. Furthermore, like many meropids, they have a wide chest band. Its chest band is made up of two colours, a deep purple-blue gorget above a chestnut coloured breastband.

Juveniles of the blue-breasted bee-eater have buff flanks and belly. They have a yellow-buff chin that leads to a light green mottled breast. Juveniles also completely lack a chest band.

=== Similar species ===
The little bee-eaters and the cinnamon-chested bee-eater are both very similar to the blue-breasted bee-eater. Although the little bee-eater is similar in voice, behavior and distribution it is smaller than the blue breasted, with a relatively smaller head as well. Furthermore, the little bee-eater lacks the white margin of cheeks present on the blue breasted. The cinnamon-chested bee-eater which also live in Ethiopia has the black mask and white cheek like that of the blue breasted bee eater. However, the blue breasted bee eater is smaller and has a much brighter green crown.

== Taxonomy ==
The blue-breasted bee-eater is a member of the family Meropidae. A family whose members are relatively uniform in behavior and morphology, it is a well-defined family within the coraciiform order in class Aves. Meropidae originated in East Asia or Africa, and much of its early diversification occurred in Africa. Meropidae has two major clades, one exclusively made up of African residents while the second one is mostly migrant species found in Asia and Africa.

The genus Merops is with in the African resident clade of Meropidae. Historically Merops was split up into six genera which are no longer valid: Bomblonax, Melittophagus, Dicrocercus, Meropiscus, Aerops and Philothurs. Merops variegatus closest relative is M. pusillus, the little bee-eater. They are considered sister tax and make up their own clade. The outgroup to the M. variegatus - M. pusillus clade is M. oreobates, cinnamon-chested bee-eater.

The blue-breasted bee-eater has three subspecies; M. v. variegatus, M. v. loringi, and M. v. banweoloensis. The Ethiopian bee-eater (M. lafresnayii) was formerly considered conspecific, but was split as a distinct species by the IOC in 2021. It is now known to be a distinct lineage, being more closely related to M. oreobates than to M. variegatus.

== Habitat and distribution ==
Blue breasted bee-eaters are found in many central African countries such as Angola, Zambia, Tanzania, Uganda, the Democratic Republic of the Congo, Nigeria and Cameroon. Within these countries the blue-breasted bee-eaters are found in a variety of habitats, ranging from reedy lake shores to the savanna grass lands bordering the Congo basin. They have also been recorded in marshes, grassy hillsides and papyrus beds. However, this species is usually associated with open wet habitats.

== Behavior ==
=== Vocalization ===
The perching song for this species contains short trills: pip, tup-tup and trrip where as the courtship song to a mate is more expanded: turrp p'ti p'ti p'ti.

=== Diet ===
Members of the genus Merops have a diet specialized in hymenopterans compared to the rest of Meropidae. The blue-breasted bee eaters' diet consists of a wide variety of insect species. However, most of the diet is made up of honey bee workers, flower bees and Halictid bees. The rest of their diet is supplemented by flies, beetles, true bugs, grasshoppers, and butterflies.

Blue breasted bee eaters do much of their searching for prey in pairs from a perch. In savanna and forest edge habitats they can be found perched in bushes waiting for prey. They wait for passing prey and then will give horizontal chase and catch their prey in the air. On rare occasions they have been observed diving into shallow waters to catch small fish.

=== Reproduction ===
Blue breasted bee eaters' mate at different times of the year depending on their geographic location. In the Northern reaches of their range breeding occurs from February to March, in the East from October to December, in the South September to October and in the West August to September. Nests are excavated in grassy hillsides or in eroded lakeshores. The nest consists of a tunnel, measuring from 45 to 75 cm long, which leads to an egg chamber, measuring 17-70 x 18–22 cm. The eggs are kept in the unlined egg chamber during incubation.

Although several species of Meropidae are known for cooperative breeding, the blue-breasted bee-eater is a solitary monogamous breeder. A mating pair will produce between 2 and 3 eggs. The parents and their offspring will remain very social after the young have fledged the nest. They can even be found together up until the beginning of the next breeding season.
