= Nandi Escarpment =

Disambiguation

Nandi Escarpment Nyando Escarpment
- Escarpment
- Location within Kenya
- Coordinates: 0.36866°N 34.95564°E
- Location: Nandi County

The Nandi Escarpment is an escarpment in Nandi County, Kenya. It marks the boundary between Kisumu and Nandi counties. It consists of numerous massive geological rocks, one being Nandi rock. Monkeys and baboons are among common wildlife sightings.

== Location ==
The escarpment lies on the border between Kakamega County and Nandi County. It defines the western edge of the central highlands of Kenya. The escarpment lies between the North Nandi Forest to the east and the Kakamega Forest to the west. The North Nandi Forest is a strip of high-canopy forest about 30 kilometres (19 mi) long from north to south and 3 to 5 kilometres (1.9 to 3.1 mi) wide that runs along the rim of the escarpment. To the west the Kakamega Forest, a mid-altitude tropical rainforest, lies below the escarpment in the Lake Victoria catchment.

== Description ==
The main scarp rises from around 1,700 to 2,000 metres (5,600 to 6,600 ft). The rugged terrain includes granite and volcanic rock. The Köppen climate classification is Am : Tropical monsoon climate. The Yala River rises below the escarpment.

The scarp marks the boundary between the Nandi people to the east and the Luhya people to the west. The 450 metres (1,480 ft) Sheu Morobi cliffs in the escarpment used to be used by old Nandi people to commit suicide so their family did not have to care for them. This was considered an honorable action, and would follow special rituals and a last meal. The name means "there we go forever".

== Sources ==
- Doute (1981), Kakamega Forest-Nandi Forest Complex showing the Nandi Escarpments and associated forests
- "Kakamega County", Elekevu
- Kakamega County Integrated Development Plan, 2018 – 2022, County Government of Kakamega, 2018
- Kakamega Forest (Important Bird Areas factsheet), BirdLife International, 2021
- Matoke, Tom (12 July 2017), "Sheu Morobi: Cliffs of death in Nandi", The East African
- "Nandi Escarpment, Nandi, Kenya", Mindat
- North Nandi forest (Important Bird Areas factsheet), BirdLife International, 2021
- Okuna, Patience (2019), Threats to the survival of river Yala in Kenya, Munich: GRIN Verlag
