= Kaptis Hydroelectric Power Station =

Kenyan power station

- Location within Kenya
- Official name: Kaptis Power Station
- Country: Kenya
- Location: Kaptis, Kakamega County/Vihiga County
- Coordinates: 00°12′16″N 34°53′52″E
- Purpose: Power
- Status: Proposed
- Construction began: 2020 Expected
- Opening date: 2022 Expected

Dam and spillways
- Type of dam: Run of river
- Impounds: Yala River
- Spillway type: N/A

Power Station
- Commission date: 2022 Expected
- Turbines: 3 x 5 MW
- Installed capacity: 15 megawatts (20,000 hp)
- Annual generation: 86 GWh

Kaptis Hydroelectric Power Station, also Kaptis Power Station, is a planned hydroelectric power plant in Kenya, with generation capacity of 15 megawatts (20,115 hp).

== Location ==
The power station straddles the border of Kakamega and Vihiga Counties in Western Kenya and is located about 20 kilometres (12 mi), by road, southeast of the town of Kakamega.

== Overview ==
Kaptis Power Station is an independent power project, under development by a consortium comprising (a) Tembo Power, based in Ebene, Mauritius (b) Metier Private Equity International, a company based in Sandhurst, Gauteng, South Africa and (c) WK Construction, a South African engineering and construction company, based in Johannesburg. The consortium that is developing the power station, also owns it, as outlined in the table below.

Kaptis Power Station Stock Ownership
Rank	Name of Owner	Percentage Ownership
1	Metier Private Equity International of South Africa	40.0
2	WK Construction of South Africa	20.0
3	Tembo Power of Mauritius	40.0
	Total	100.00

== Funding ==
The run-of-the-river hydroelectric power plant is budgeted to cost US$44 million. The owner/developers of the power station will raise US$14 million in equity financing. The remaining US$30 million will be borrowed as arranged by the selected financial arranger, the Emerging Africa Infrastructure Fund, a subsidiary of the Private Infrastructure Development Group.

In April 2020, it was announced that the US$30 million loan would be provided jointly by the Finnish Fund for Industrial Cooperation Limited (Finnfund) and Ninety One SA (formerly Investec Asset Management), a subsidiary of the Emerging Africa Infrastructure Fund (EAIF).

== Construction ==
It is anticipated that the project will reach financial close and construction will begin in the fourth quarter of 2020. Commercial commissioning is expected in the second half of 2022. WK Construction is expected to be the preferred civil works contractor.

== See also ==
- List of power stations in Kenya
