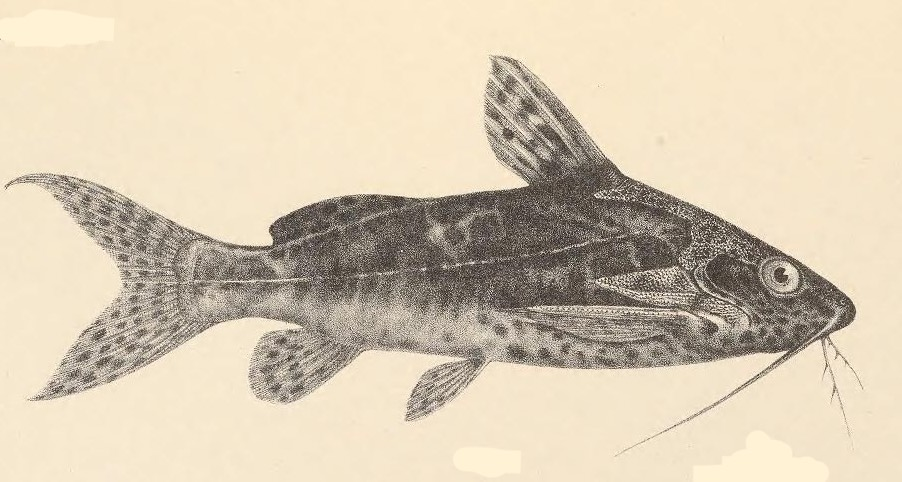

Conservation status
- Least Concern (IUCN 3.1)

Scientific classification
- Kingdom: Animalia
- Phylum: Chordata
- Class: Actinopterygii
- Order: Siluriformes
- Family: Mochokidae
- Genus: Synodontis
- Species: S. afrofischeri

Binomial name
- Synodontis afrofischeri Hilgendorf, 1888

= Synodontis afrofischeri =

Fischer's Victoria squeaker

Species of fish

Synodontis afrofischeri, known as Fischer's Victoria squeaker, the marbled Victoria squeaker, Fischer's catfish, or the Victoria synodontis, is a species of upside-down catfish native to Kenya, Rwanda, Tanzania and Uganda. It was first described by German zoologist Franz Martin Hilgendorf in 1888, based upon a holotype discovered in Lake Victoria. The specific name "afrofischeri" is in honor of the German researcher Dr. Gustav Fischer, a German explorer of Africa.

== Description ==
The body of the fish is a marbled yellowish brown, although the amount of marbling varies between individuals, with some a uniform brown. The fish has a dark to black band that traverses from the eye to the mouth, and two irregular light vertical bands on either side of the adipose fin. Juveniles have a very similar appearance to juvenile S. fuelleborni juveniles.

Like other members of the genus, this fish has a humeral process, which is a bony spike that is attached to a hardened head cap on the fish and can be seen extending beyond the gill opening. The first ray of the dorsal fin and the pectoral fins have a hardened first ray which is serrated. The caudal fin is forked. It has short, cone-shaped teeth in the upper jaw. In the lower jaw, the teeth are s-shaped and movable. The fish has one pair of maxillary barbels of varying length, extending far beyond the operculum, and two pairs of mandibular barbels that are often branched.

This species grows to a maximum known length of 17.7 centimetres (7.0 in) TL

== Habitat ==
In the wild, the species inhabits tropical waters with a temperature range of 22 to 26 °C (72 to 79 °F), a pH of 6.0 – 8.0, and dH range of 5-25. It is found at depths ranging from 0 to 70 metres (0 to 230 ft), usually 30 metres (98 ft). It is found in Lake Victoria, Lake Nagubago, the Victoria Nile, Lake Kyoga, the Kagera River, Lake Ihema, the Malagarasi River and possibly in the Kingani River.
