= Lake Kanyaboli =

Lake in Kenya

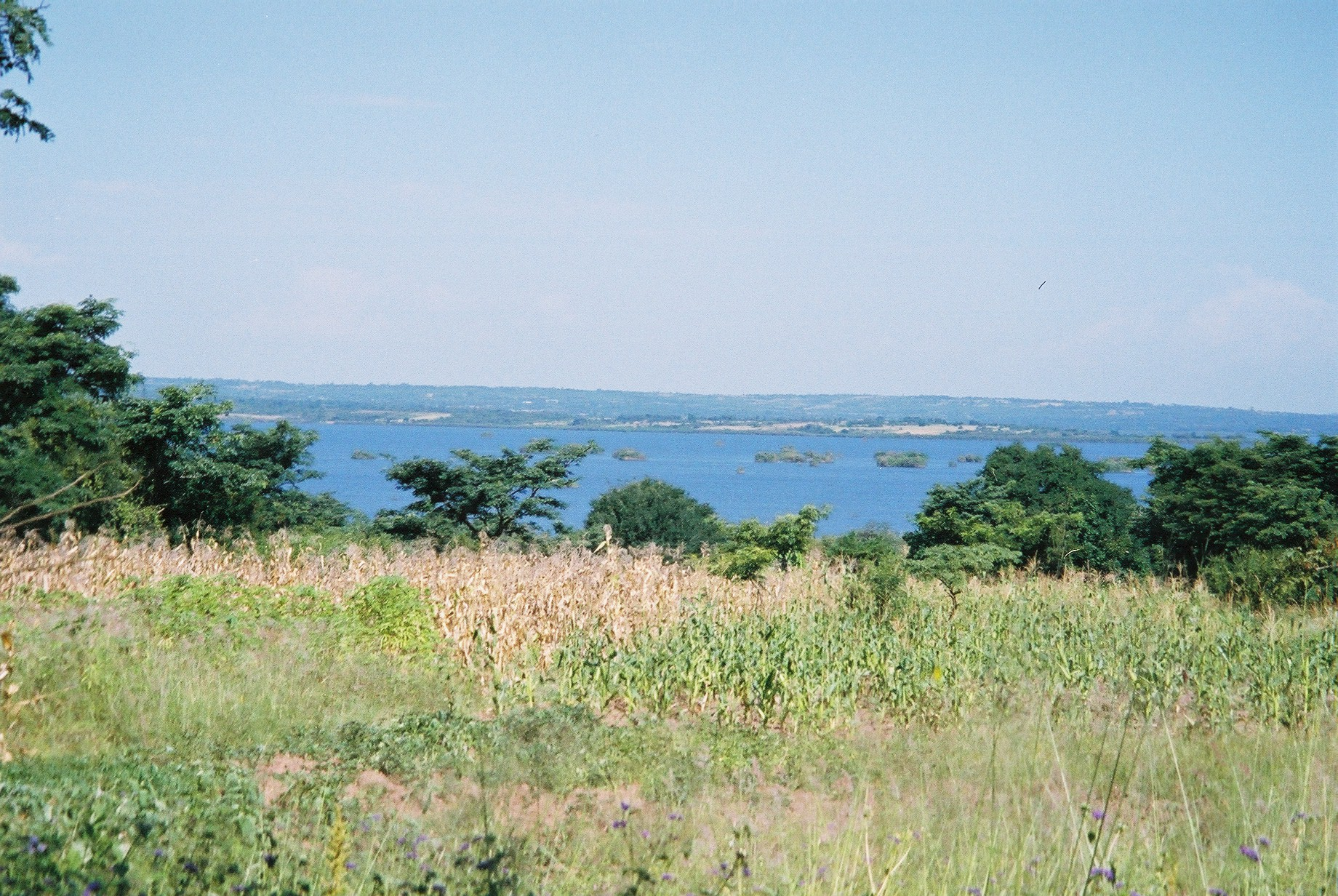
- Lake Kanyaboli from the north shore

- Location within Kenya
- Location: Yala Swamp, Kenya
- Coordinates: 0.059°N 34.16°E
- River sources: Yala River, Nzoia River
- Basin countries: Kenya, Uganda

Lake Kanyaboli is the largest oxbow lake in Kenya and the second largest in Africa, formed after River Yala disconnected from its course at the meander stage, leaving behind a U-shaped lake. The lake is found in Siaya County in western Kenya and is home to a variety of fish species that have almost disappeared from Lake Victoria, the country's largest freshwater lake.

== Location ==
The Yala Swamp at the mouth of the Yala River covers about 175 square kilometres (68 sq mi) along the northern shore of Lake Victoria. The swamp contains 1,500 hectares (3,700 acres) Lake Kanyaboli, a freshwater deltaic wetland with an average depth of 3 metres (9.8 ft), which is fed by the floodwaters of the Nzoia and Yala rivers and by the backflow of water from Lake Victoria.

In the past the Yala River flowed through the eastern 20% of the Yala Swamp into Lake Kanyaboli, then into the main swamp, and then through a small gulf into Lake Victoria. Today the eastern part of the swamp has been drained, and the river flows directly into the 8,000 hectares (20,000 acres) main swamp. It is cut off from Lake Kanyaboli by a silt-clay dyke. Lake Kanyaboli now receives its water from the surrounding catchment area and from back-seepage from the swamp.

== Ecological value ==
Lake Kanyaboli provides a refuge for several species of fish, some of which are no longer present in Lake Victoria. The introduction of the Nile perch (Lates niloticus) to Lake Victoria caused an ecological disaster which threatens to destroy the ecosystem of the lake. In the past the lake fishermen caught hundreds of species of fish, many of which were endemic. Today they rely on the Silver cyprinid (Rastrineobola argentea) locally known as "Omena" or "Dagaa" among East African communities, the Nile Perch and the Nile tilapia (Oreochromis niloticus). In 1988 the World Conservation Union listed hundreds of the endemic fish species as Endangered. Some of these fish are still thriving in Lake Kanyaboli, including several unknown Haplochromis species, Singida tilapia (Oreochromis esculentus) and Victoria tilapia (Oreochromis variabilis).

== Threats and conservation ==
Lake Kanyaboli is among hundreds of ecosystems which are facing extinction threats in the country. Like its cousin oxbow lake in the Rift Valley, Lake Kamnarok, a game reserve which is currently at the edge of losing its value, Lake Kanyaboli is also underway to become history. In early May, 2023, the lake broke all its dykes following the heavy rains in the region and lost its water at alarming rate for more than one week. The water swept everything on its way, destroying thousands of acres of farms and leaving hundreds of families homeless. According to the Nation Media report, the lake lost more than 50% of its volume, and if urgent action is not taken, then the lives of the communities that rely on it would be adversely affected.

== Sources ==
- Okuna, Patience (2019), Threats to the survival of river Yala in Kenya, Munich: GRIN Verlag
- Lake Kanyaboli – Kenya, Global Nature Fund
- Maithya, Jacob (1998), "A survey of ichthyofauna of Lake Kanyaboli and other small waterbodies in Kenya: alternative refugia for endangered fish species" (PDF), NAGA, 21 (1): 54–56
- Yala Swamp Complex, BirdLife International
