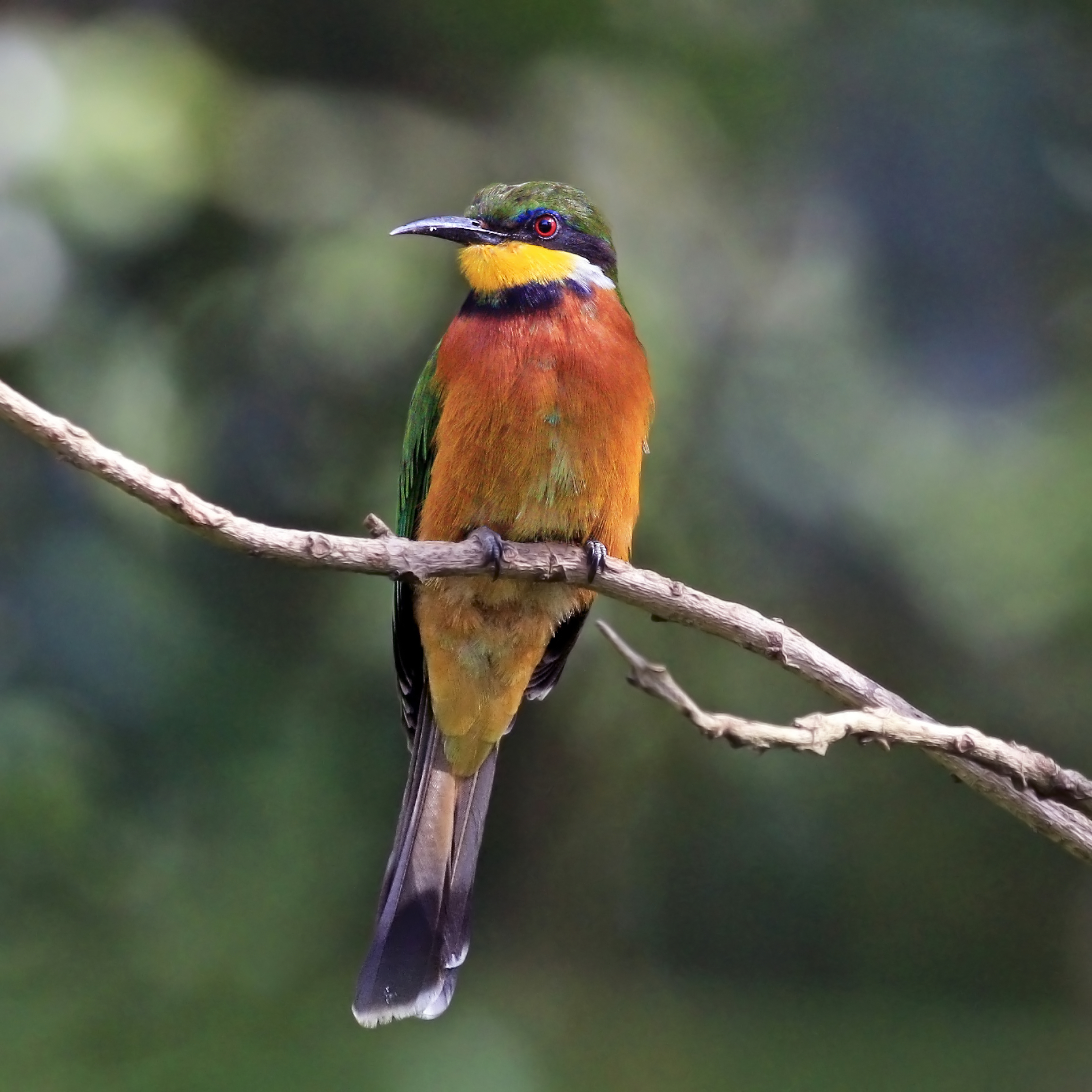

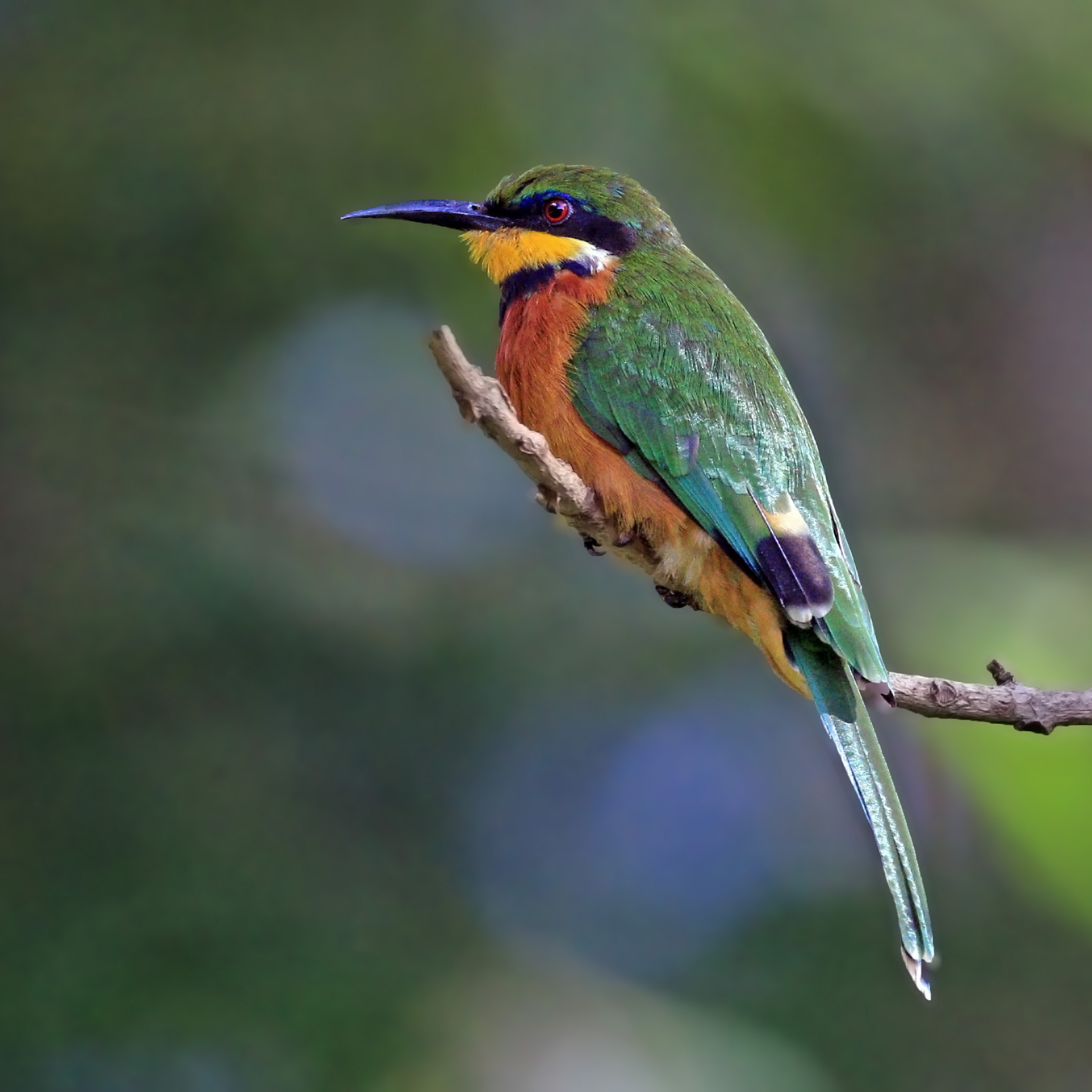
- Kakamega Forest, Kenya

Conservation status
- Least Concern (IUCN 3.1)

Scientific classification
- Kingdom: Animalia
- Phylum: Chordata
- Class: Aves
- Order: Coraciiformes
- Family: Meropidae
- Genus: Merops
- Species: M. oreobates

Binomial name
- Merops oreobates (Sharpe, 1892)

= Cinnamon-chested bee-eater =

Species of bird

The cinnamon-chested bee-eater (Merops oreobates) is a species of bird in the family Meropidae. It is mainly native to the Albertine Rift montane forests and the East African montane forests of East Africa, in the regions surrounding Lake Victoria.

== Description ==
The species measures 22 centimetres (8.7 in) in length and weighs 17–38 grams (0.60–1.34 oz). The sexes are alike. They have bright green heads, upper parts, and tails; their chins and throats are yellow and outlined in black, with a white extension to the side; their breasts are cinnamon-brown, darkening towards the belly. When perched, their stance is upright with the tail pointing downward. The tail is blackish with an orange base and white tip when seen from the front, while from the back it is mainly green, with black edges visible when it is flared. This bird can be distinguished from the somewhat similar little bee-eater by their larger size, darker colouring, white cheek patches, and the upland habitat where they are found.

== Ecology ==
This bird lives in upland regions, usually between 1,800 and 2,300 metres (5,900 and 7,500 ft), and can be found associated with wooded hillsides and forest edges, clearings, plantations, and gardens. Its diet consists mainly of honeybees although it also eats moths, butterflies, dragonflies, beetles, and other flying insects. It seems to be an adaptable species and able to withstand loss of its forest habitat.

== Status ==
The cinnamon-chested bee-eater has a very wide range, and although the population size has not been quantified, it is thought to be large, and the International Union for Conservation of Nature has assessed their conservation status as being of "least concern".
