= Fuelleborn's squeaker =

Conservation status
- Least Concern (IUCN 3.1)

Scientific classification
- Kingdom: Animalia
- Phylum: Chordata
- Class: Actinopterygii
- Order: Siluriformes
- Family: Mochokidae
- Genus: Synodontis
- Species: S. fuelleborni

Binomial name
- Synodontis fuelleborni Hilgendorf & Pappenheim, 1903

Species of fish

Fuelleborn's squeaker (Synodontis fuelleborni) is a species of upside-down catfish that is native to Tanzania where it is found in Lake Rukwa and the Rufiji River basin. It was first described by Franz Martin Hilgendorf and Paul Pappenheim in 1903, from a specimen collected at Lake Rukwa. The species name fuelleborni is named in honor of Prof. Dr. F. Fülleborn, who collected the original sample.

== Description ==
Like all members of the genus Synodontis, S. fuelleborni has a strong, bony head capsule that extends back as far as the first spine of the dorsal fin. The head contains a distinct narrow, bony, external protrusion called a humeral process. The shape and size of the humeral process helps to identify the species. In S. fuelleborni, the humeral process is triangular in shape, with a ridge on the bottom edge.

The fish has three pairs of barbels. The maxillary barbels are on located on the upper jaw, and two pairs of mandibular barbels are on the lower jaw. The maxillary barbel is long and straight without any branches, with a distinct membrane at the base. It reaches the end of the humeral process. The outer pair of mandibular barbels has long, simple branches, and the inner pair has short and thick branches with secondary branches.

The front edges of the dorsal fins and the pectoral fins of Syntontis species are hardened into stiff spines. In S. fuelleborni, the spine of the dorsal fin is slightly shorter than the head, smooth in the front and serrated on the back. The remaining portion of the dorsal fin is made up of seven branching rays. The spine of the pectoral fin about the same size as the dorsal spine, and serrated on both sides. The anal fin contains four unbranched and eight branched rays. The tail, or caudal fin, is deeply forked.

All members of Syndontis have a structure called a premaxillary toothpad, which is located on the very front of the upper jaw of the mouth. This structure contains several rows of short, chisel-shaped teeth. In S. fuelleborni, the toothpad forms a short and broad band. On the lower jaw, or mandible, the teeth of Syndontis are attached to flexible, stalk-like structures and described as "s-shaped" or "hooked". The number of teeth on the mandible is used to differentiate between species; in S. fuelleborni, there are about 51 teeth on the mandible.

The base body color is a dark yellowish green, marbled with bright yellow to dark olive brown. The fins are grey with dark bands.

The maximum standard length of the species is 19.2 centimetres (7.6 in). Generally, females in the genus Synodontis tend to be slightly larger than males of the same age.

== Habitat and behavior ==
In the wild, the species has been found in rivers and the swampy areas of lakes, in Lake Rukwa and the Rufigi basin of Tanzania. It inhabits the areas close to shore. The reproductive habits of most of the species of Synodontis are not known, beyond some instances of obtaining egg counts from gravid females. Spawning is thought to happen in April or May, in the open water of the lake, and pairs swim in unison during spawning. As a whole, species of Synodontis are omnivores, consuming insect larvae, algae, gastropods, bivalves, sponges, crustaceans, and the eggs of other fishes. The growth rate is rapid in the first year, then slows down as the fish age.
