= Kesses Dam =

Lake in Kenya

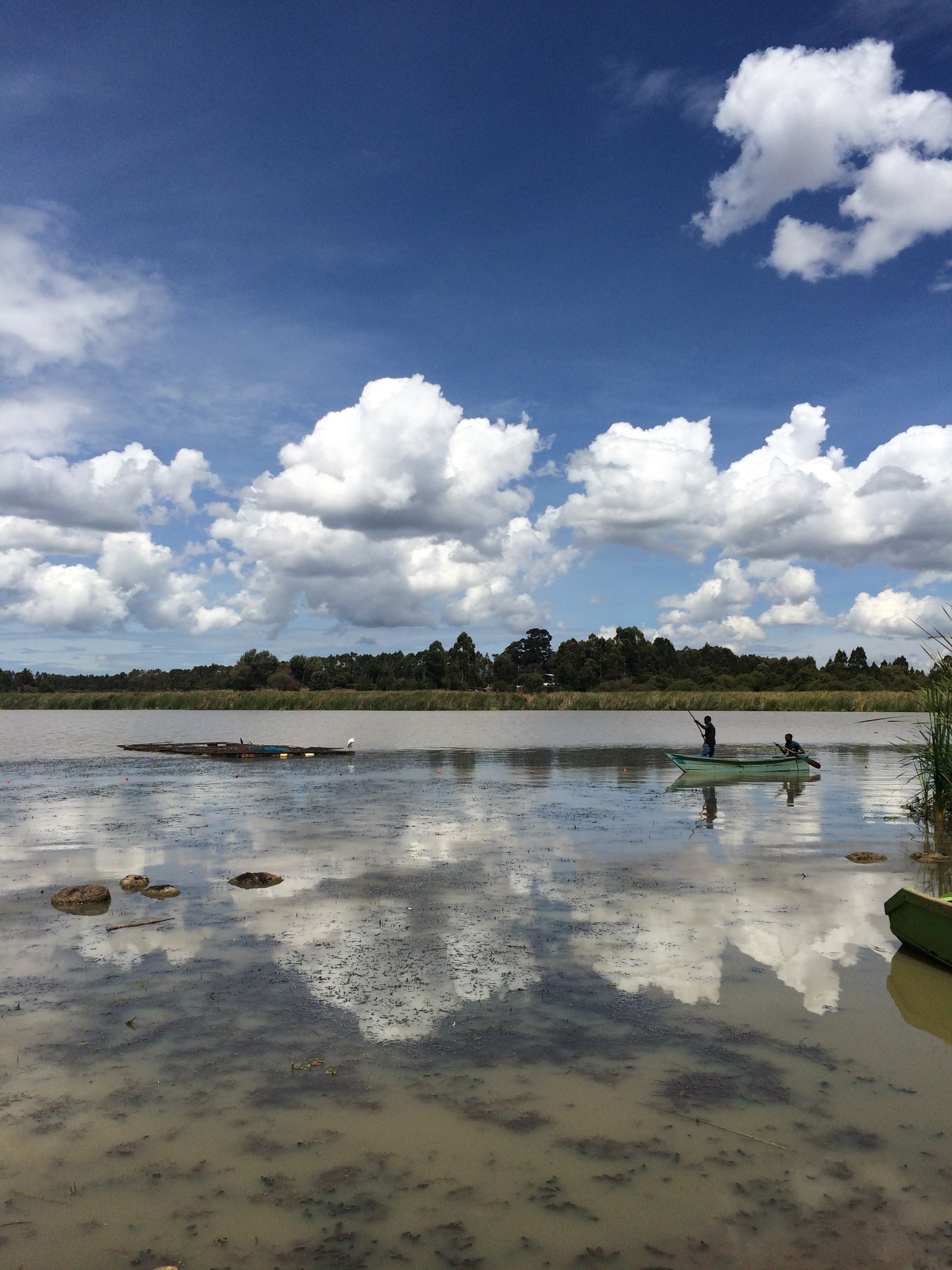
- Kesses Reservoir on 18 May 2019

- Location in Kenya
- Location: Uasin Gishu County, Kenya
- Coordinates: 0.2808°N 35.3337°E
- Primary inflows: Tarakwa and Nderugut rivers
- Primary outflows: Sambul River
- Catchment area: 1,720 hectares (4,300 acres)
- Surface area: 189 hectares (470 acres)
- Average depth: 3 metres (9.8 ft)

Kesses Dam (or Lake Lessos) is a small man-made lake in Kenya. It is one of the sources of the Yala River. It is used as a source of water for irrigation and domestic use, and also for boating and other water activities.

== Location ==
Kesses Dam is in Kesses Sub County of Uasin Gishu County, on a plateau in Rift Valley. The climate is cool and temperate. The area has level terrain with medium gradient hills with shallow depressions. There are wetlands and small permanent streams.

Kesses Dam is 31 kilometres (19 mi) south of Eldoret town and 6 kilometres (3.7 mi) east of the main campus of Moi University, at an elevation of 2,750 metres (9,020 ft). It receives most of its water from the Tarakwa and Nderugut rivers, which enter the reservoir from the east through a swamp of Typha latifolia and Cyperus species. The catchment area is about 1,720 hectares (4,300 acres). As of 2012 the reservoir had an area of 189 hectares (470 acres). The average depth is 3 metres (9.8 ft). The outlet is the Sambul River to the west. The reservoir is one of the Yala River's main sources.

== Development ==
The dam site was originally a depression on the farm of a Danish colonist, Eric Jorgensen, which covered about 500 acres (200 ha) of poor pasture. Jorgensen got the support of six of his neighbors to build a dam, which cost £3,000. Within 50 days two streams had filled the reservoir, which had two arms, 1.5 and 1.25 miles (2.41 and 2.01 km) long respectively. As of 1967 there was a yacht club at the dam.

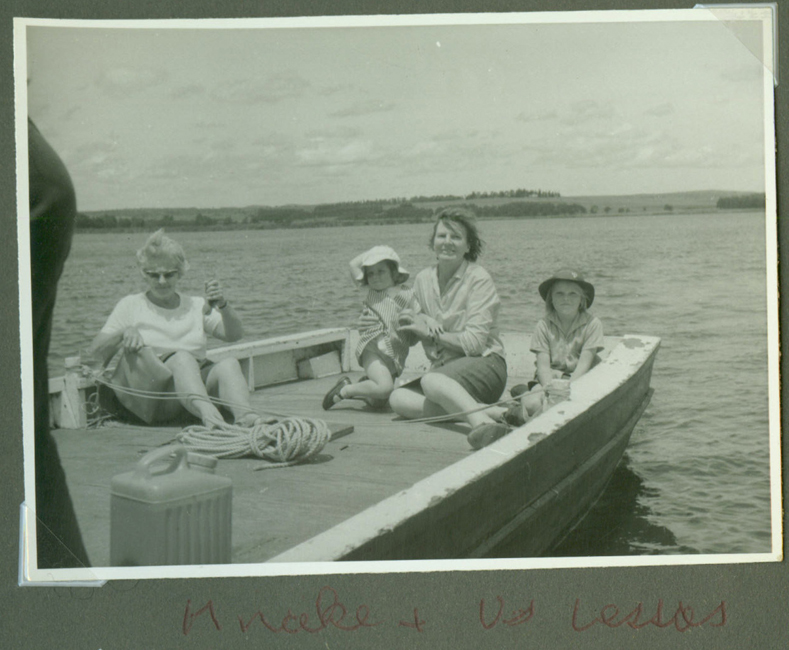
Lessos Dam late 1960's

During the May 1984 parliamentary debate over establishing Moi University at Eldoret it was pointed out that Lake Lessos was nearby and was one of the largest man-made lakes, so the new university would have a plentiful supply of water, an important consideration due to the dry climate. The lake was not being used at the time. It could also be used for experiments by the students taking fisheries courses, and by a yacht club. A large water pipe was installed to carry water to the university.

In a parliamentary debate in 1991 it was noted that the dam was at present only supplying Moi University. However, the dam had been made higher, expanding the reservoir to hold more water, and could be used to supply homesteads in the area. Work was underway to raise the height of the dam and surveys were in progress to bring the water to areas around the Kesses Centre, Kesses Secondary School, Bombay area and residential areas between Kesses Centre and Moi University.

== Wildlife ==
In 1978–1988 the reservoir was used for wintering by several migratory duck species. Mean annual numbers were Wigeon: 8, Northern pintail: 45, Garganey: 105 and Shoveler: 60.

The first fish to be introduced were Tilapiine cichlids. In 1990 and 1996 about 5,000 fingerlings of Nile tilapia (Oreochromis niloticus) were introduced. Barbus and Gambusia species have also been observed. Clinostomum parasites were found in 75% of a sample of fish taken in 2010–2011 from Kesses Dam, with higher levels among males than females. The relatively high levels may be due in part to waste water being released into the reservoir from the nearby urban center and school.

== Activities ==
The Dam is used as a recreational center by the Moi University students, and by the local people and visitors. Activities include boating, fishing, birdwatching and sitatunga viewing.

== Sources ==
- arap Saina, William Morogo (1984), "The Moi University Bill", Kenya National Assembly Official Record (Hansard)
- Ayre, Peter, "Name: JORGENSEN, Eric 'Jorg'", Europeans In East Africa
- Boye, Anja; Verchot, Louis; Zomer, Robert (5 March 2008), Baseline Report Yala and Nzoia River Basins (PDF) (Western Kenya Integrated Ecosystem Management Project: Findings from the Baseline Surveys), Nairobi, Kenya: International Centre for Research in Agorforestry
- Ochieng, V. O.; Matolla, G.K.; Khyria, S.K. (April 2012), "A Study of Clinostomum affecting Oreochromis niloticus in small water bodies in Eldoret-Kenya", International Journal of Scientific & Engineering Research, 3 (4), ISSN 2229-5518
- Pearson, D.J.; Meadows, B.S. (1977), "Palearctic duck in Kenya", Scopus, East Africa Natural History Society. Ornithological Sub-Committee: 111
- "Tourism Destinations", Uasin Gishu County Tourism Portal
- Wameyo (1991-07-02), "Measures to supply enough water to Eldoret South", Kenya National Assembly Official Record (Hansard)
