= Kakamega Forest =

Rainforest in Kakamega & Nandi Counties, Kenya

Coordinates: 0°17′30″N 34°51′22″E

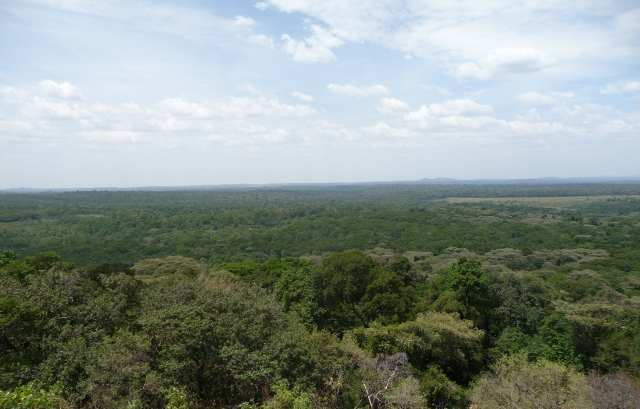
View over Kakamega forest.

Kakamega Forest is a tropical rainforest situated in the Kakamega, Vihiga, and Nandi counties of Kenya, northwest of the capital Nairobi, and near the border with Uganda. It is Kenya's only tropical rainforest and is said to be Kenya's last remnant of the ancient Guineo-Congolian rainforest that once spanned the continent.

== Geography ==
The forest lies on undulating terrain, mostly between 1500 and 1600 metres elevation. It is in the watershed of the Isiukhu and Yala rivers, which originate on the Nandi Escarpment to the east and flow westwards through the forest before emptying into Lake Victoria.

The forest including reserves encloses about 238 square kilometres, a little less than half of which currently remains as indigenous forest. In the north of the forest is the 4,468 hectares (45 km^{2}; 17 sq mi) Kakamega National Reserve, given national forest reserve status in 1985. Just to the north is the Kisere Forest Reserve. Throughout the forest are a series of grassy glades, ranging in size from about 1 to 50, with a few larger clearings. The origins of the glades are uncertain. Some are certainly recent clearings, but others predate recent records. These may have originated from past human activity such as cattle grazing or may be the result of herbivory and movements by large mammals such as buffalo and elephants (both now extinct from the region). The glades vary a great deal in structure, some being open grass and others having a considerable number of trees or shrubs. A number of streams and small creeks run through the reserve. The larger creeks are usually bordered by a few to tens of metres of forest on either side which divide the glades, while the smallest creeks flow through open grasslands, often forming small marshy patches.

== Climate ==
Kakamega Rainforest, hidden deep within the dark blue, (Tropical, rainforest) splotch in the western portion of this Köppen-Geiger climate classification map, The rainforest lies in Southeastern Kakamega county, Western Nandi county, and Northern Vihiga county, although the entire region has a tropical rainforest climate, despite not being part of the national park.

Köppen climate classification map for Kenya for 1980–2016 The Kakamega Forest is wet, with an average of 1200 mm – 1700 mm of rain per year. Rainfall is heaviest in April and May ("long rains"), with a slightly drier June and a second peak in August to September ("short rains"). January and February are the driest months. Temperature is fairly constant throughout the year, ranging between 20 °C and 30 °C.

== Biodiversity ==
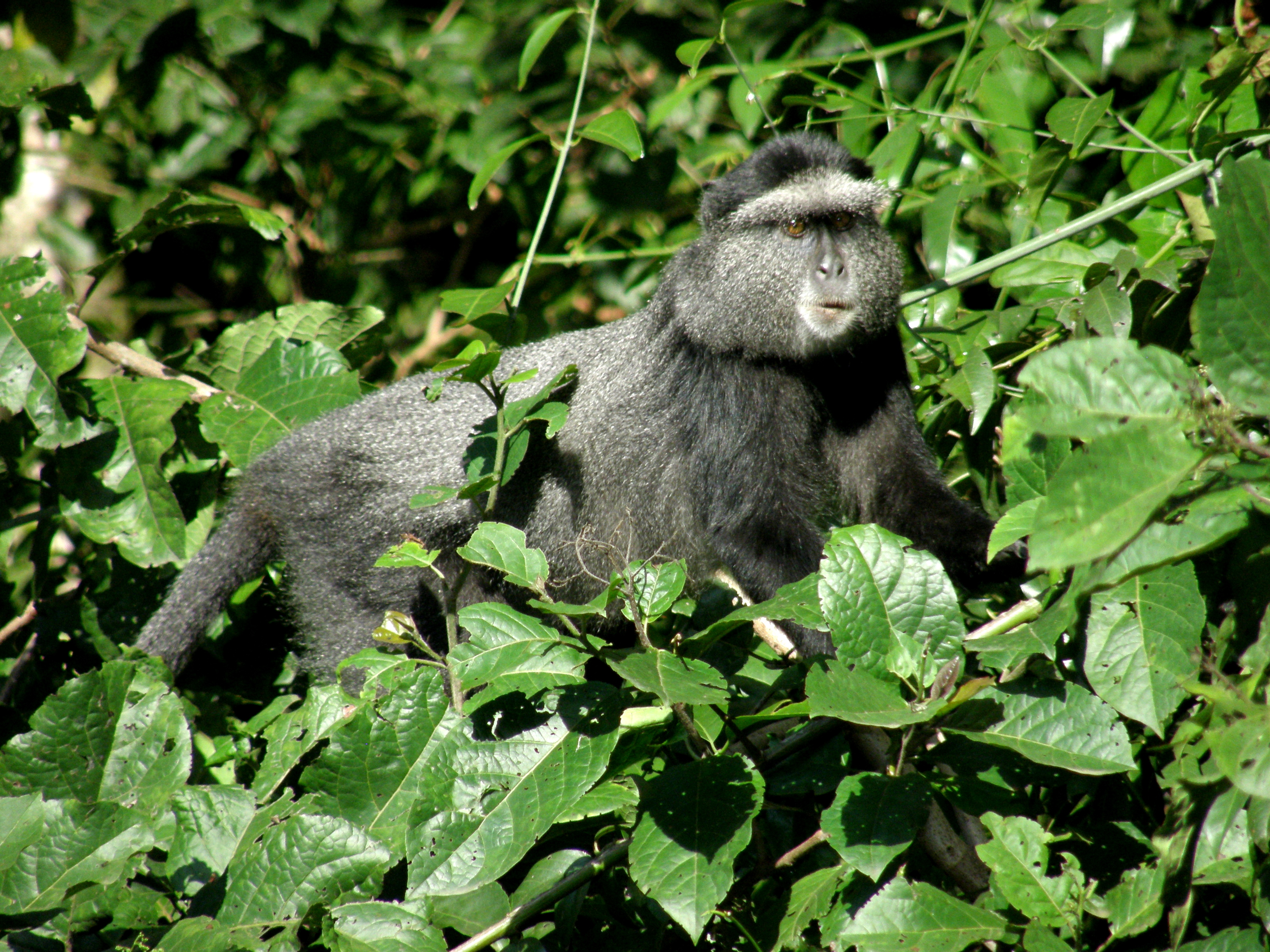
Blue monkey climbing in tree at Kakamega Rain Forest.

The forest lies in the Victoria Basin forest-savanna mosaic ecoregion. The forest's flora and fauna include many species associated with the moist forests of the Guineo-Congolian region, which lie further west in the basin of the Congo River.

Flora found in the park include some of Africa's greatest hard and soft woods, including Elgon teak (Olea welwitschii), red stinkwood (Prunus africana), white stinkwood, several varieties of croton, and Aningeria altissima. There are 380 recorded species of plants. This includes 60 species of ferns, 150 species of trees and shrubs, and 170 species of flowering plants including 60 species of orchids with 9 species found only in this forest.

The forest is famous for its birds. 367 bird species have been recorded in the forest such as the west African Great blue turaco and black-and-white-casqued hornbill. At least 9 birds are not found anywhere else.

Mammals that occur in the park include bush pig, duikers, bushbuck, African clawless otter, mongoose, giant African water shrew, African elephants, tree pangolin, porcupine, bats and a variety of primates including the blue monkey, redtail monkey, De Brazza's monkey, baboon, potto and the occasional vervet monkey. Leopards have been occasionally reported, but the last official sighting was in 1991.

Amphibians and reptiles are also found in Kakamega Forest.

Insects are abundant and some are quite spectacular, such as Goliath beetles, pink and green flower mantis, and numerous colorful butterflies (489 species). Particularly well represented groups are ants (Formicidae), Lepidopterans, Orthopterans, and beetles. Gastropods, millipedes and spiders are also common.

The flora and fauna of Kakamega Forest has not been extensively studied.

== Conservation ==

Kakamega Forest Reserve was designated in 1933. It currently has an area of 178.38 km^{2}. In 1967 the Isecheno and Yala or Lirhanda nature reserves were established within the forest reserve. Kakamega National Reserve was designated in 1985, composed of the northern portion of the Kakamega Forest Reserve and the Kisere Forest Reserve to the north. It has an area of 44.7 km^{2}.

Many local inhabitants rely on the forest to supply important resources, such as firewood, building poles and traditional medicines. Cattle grazing occurs in some of the glades. The region is said to be one of the most densely populated rural areas in the world, and pressure on the forest resources is considerable. The German funded project BIOTA East worked in the forest from 2001 until 2010, creating forest inventories for many life forms and aiming to find strategies for a sustainable use of the forest.

== Tourism ==
The Southern part of Kakamega forest, Isecheno Forest station run by the Kenya Forest Service is the most accessible in Tourism. There is the well known Mama Mtere tree, a historic tree and the most photographed tree in Kakamega forest, there are also strangler fig trees.

There are hiking trails in the forest that allow for forest walking, camping, hiking, primate watching, bird and butterfly watching, game watching and village walks. The Kakamega Rainforest Tour Guides (KRFTG) can arrange tours to visit the weeping stone (Crying stone) at Ilesi, located along the Kakamega-Kisumu road, or Kisere Forest to see the De-brazes monkey in the north of Kakamega. Also bird watching, morning 6:30 am – 8:30 am is fantastic walk or evening 4:30 pm – 6:30 pm.

Forest tours have attracted prominent personalities including outgoing US Ambassador to Kenya Robert Godec who paid a visit in April 2018 and marveled at its beauty.
