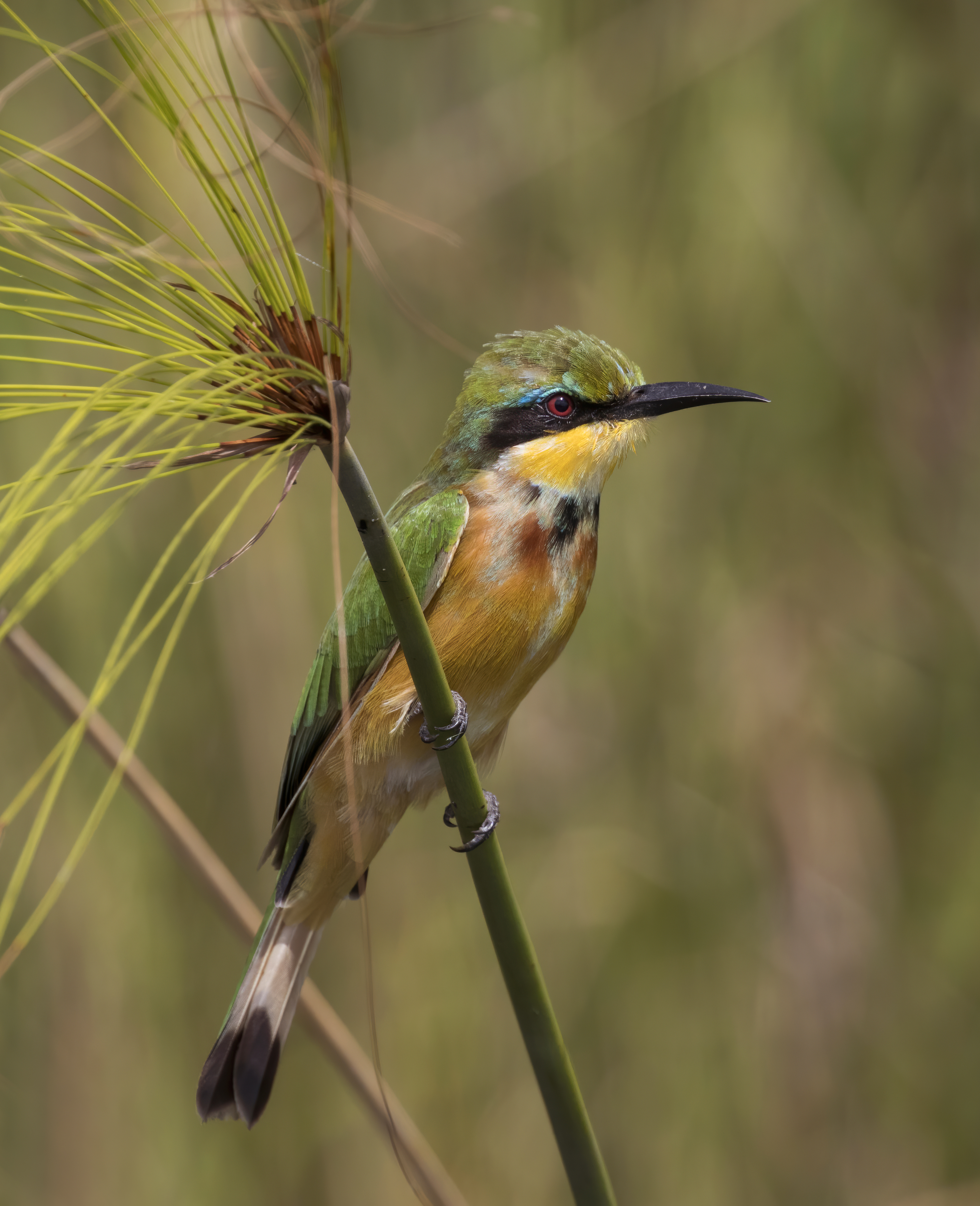
- M. p. argutus, Namibia

Conservation status
- Least Concern (IUCN 3.1)

Scientific classification
- Kingdom: Animalia
- Phylum: Chordata
- Class: Aves
- Order: Coraciiformes
- Family: Meropidae
- Genus: Merops
- Species: M. pusillus

Binomial name
- Merops pusillus Müller, PLS, 1776

Synonyms
- Melittophagus pusillus

= Little bee-eater =

Species of bird from Sub-Saharan Africa

The little bee-eater (Merops pusillus) is a bird species in the bee-eater family, Meropidae. They are found in Sub-Saharan Africa. They should not be confused with the little green bee-eater (Merops orientalis). Migration is limited to seasonal movements depending on rainfall patterns. They inhabit various biomes, such as savanna, bushveld, and even marsh-like areas.

== Description ==
Members of this species, like other bee-eaters, are rich and brightly coloured slender birds. They have green upper parts, yellow throats, black gorgets, and rich brown upper breasts fading to buffish ochre on the belly. Their wings are green and brown. Their beaks and legs are black. Tail is square in shape with a slight fork or v-shape at the end. They reach a length of 15–17 cm, which makes them the smallest African bee-eater. Sexes are alike. Often silent, their call is a soft "seep". They are often hard to spot since their green backs and wings act as camouflage.

== Ecology ==
These are abundant and tame birds, familiar throughout their range. There have been estimated to be between 60 and 80 million little bee-eaters. They breed in open country with bushes, preferably near water. Just as the name suggests, bee-eaters predominantly eat insects, especially bees, wasps and hornets, who are caught in the air by sorties from an open perch. This species often hunts from low perches, maybe only a metre or less high. Before eating their meal, a bee-eater removes the stinger by repeatedly hitting the insect on a hard surface.

Unlike most bee-eaters, these are solitary nesters, making a tunnel in sandy banks, or sometimes in the entrance to an Aardvark den. They lay 4 to 6 spherical white eggs. Both the male and the female take care of the eggs. These birds roost communally, lined up on a tree branch.

== Subspecies and plumages ==
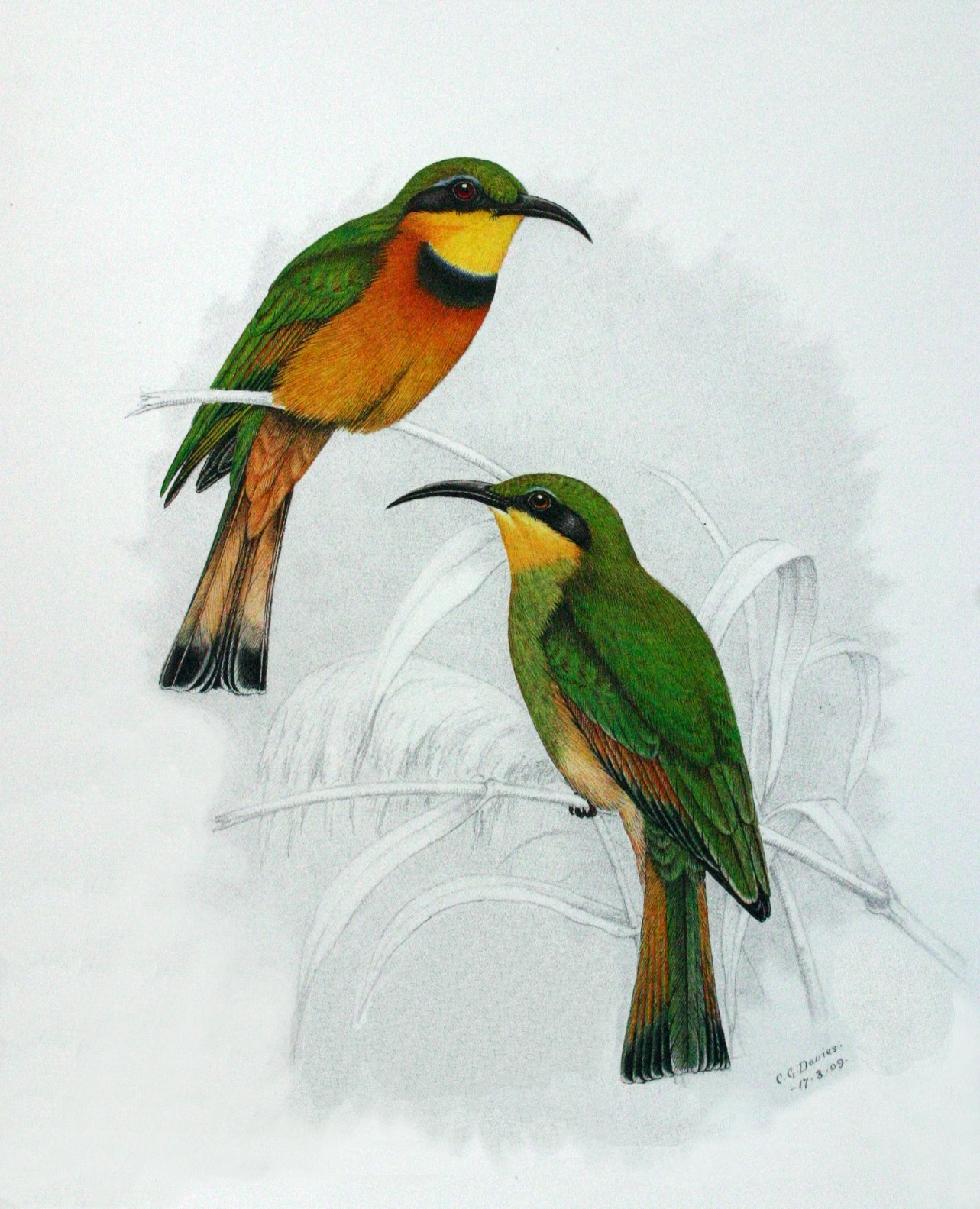
Male and juvenile female

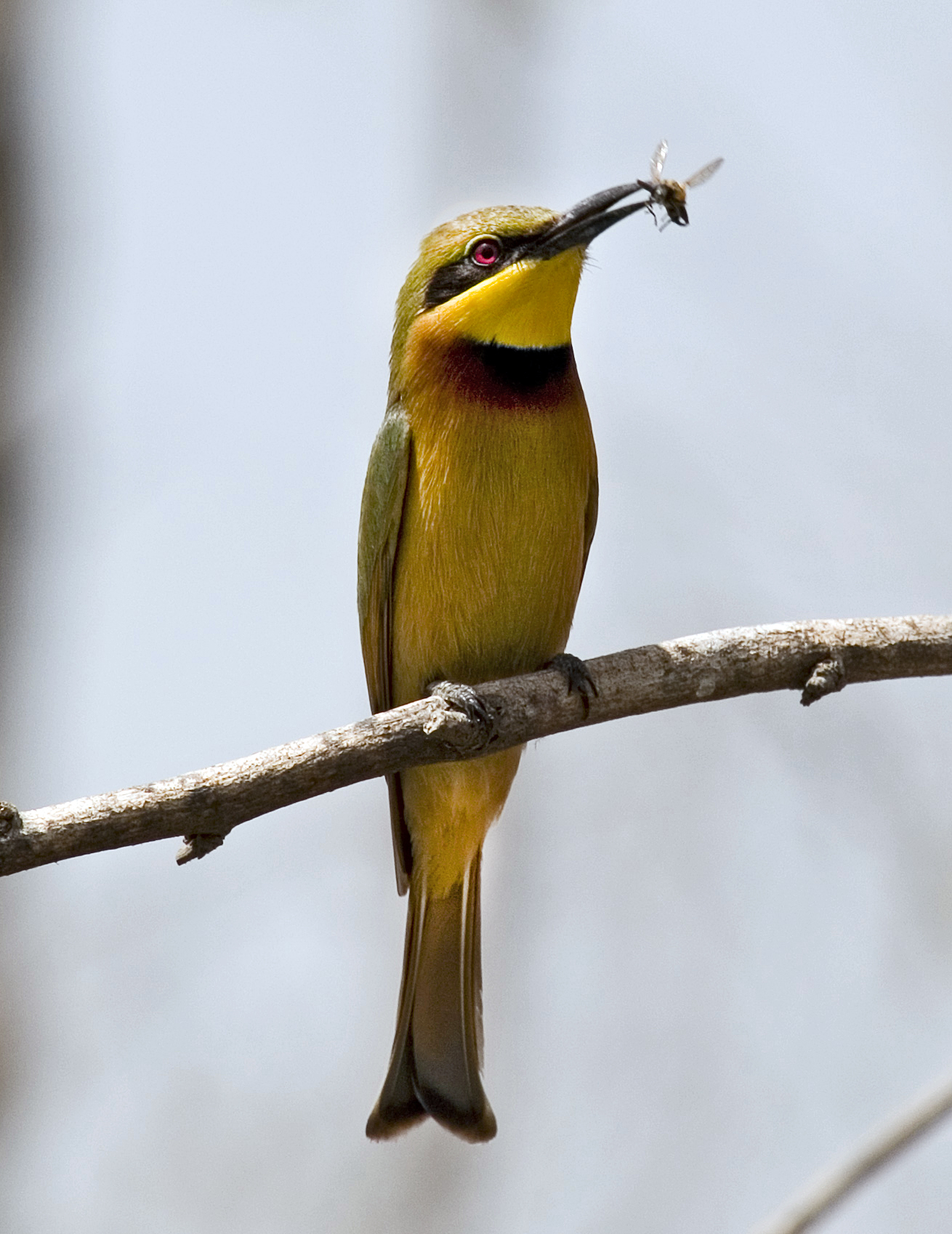
Hann Park, Dakar, Senegal

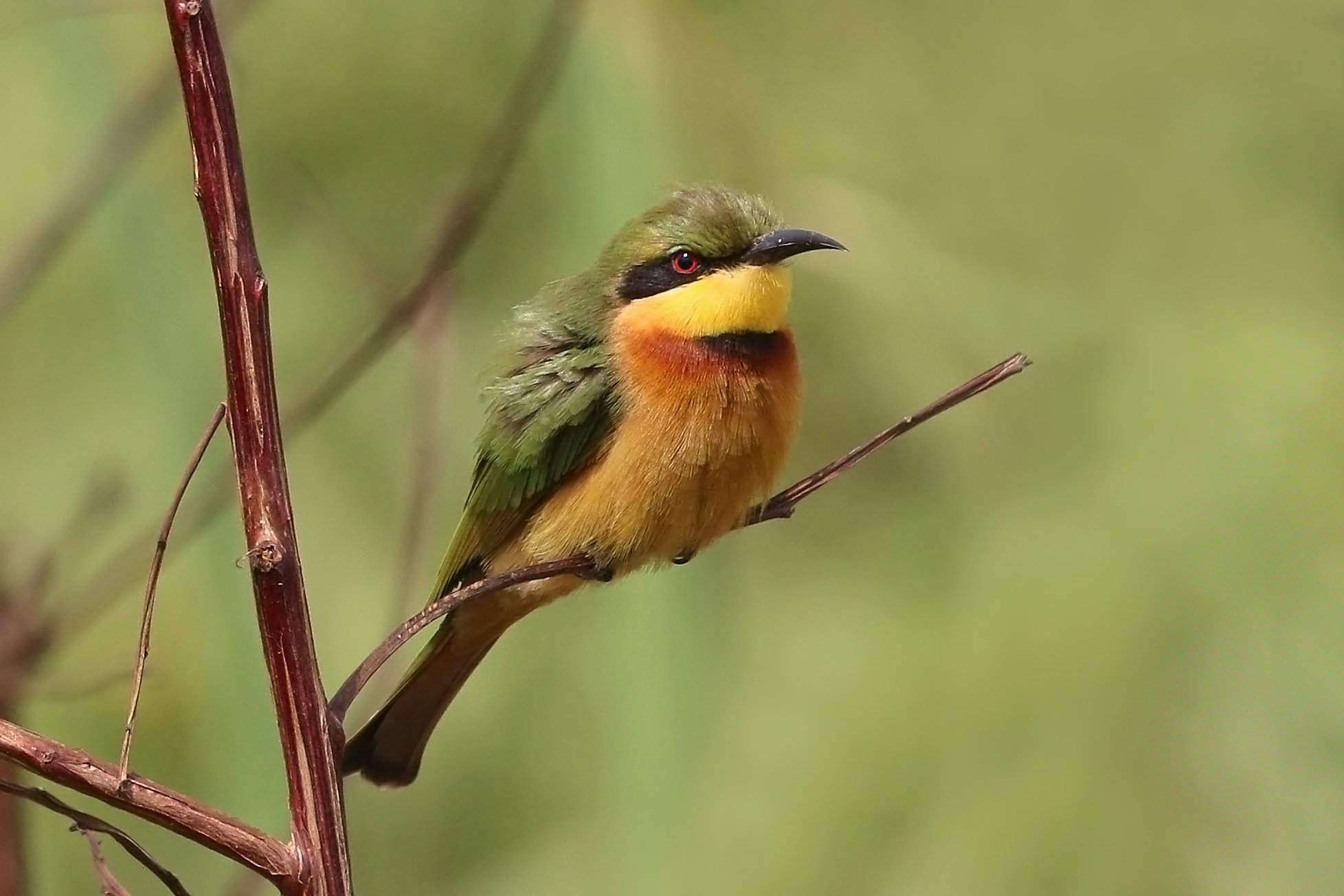
M. p. pusillus, Gambia

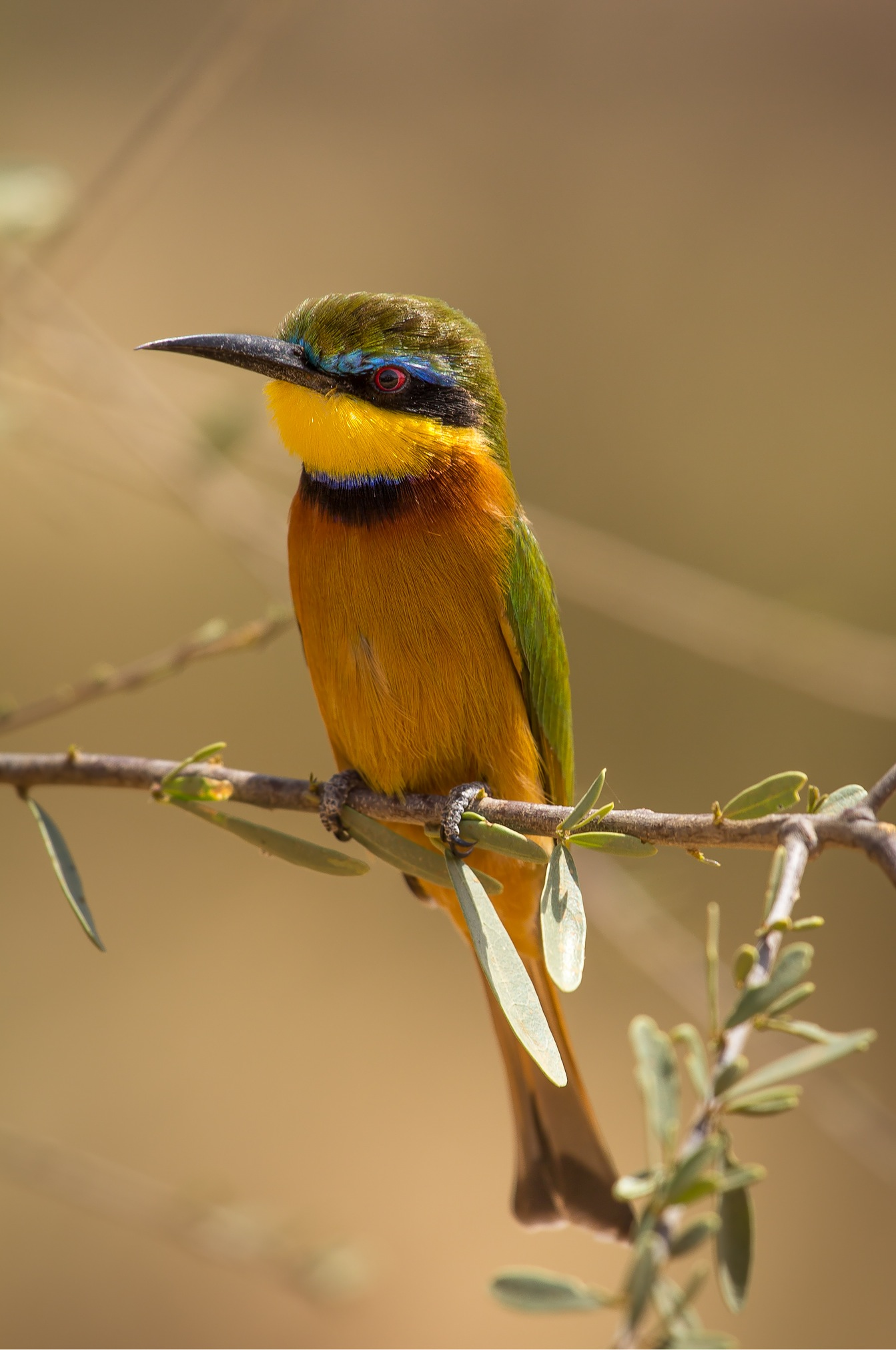
M. p. meridionalis
Samburu National Reserve, Kenya

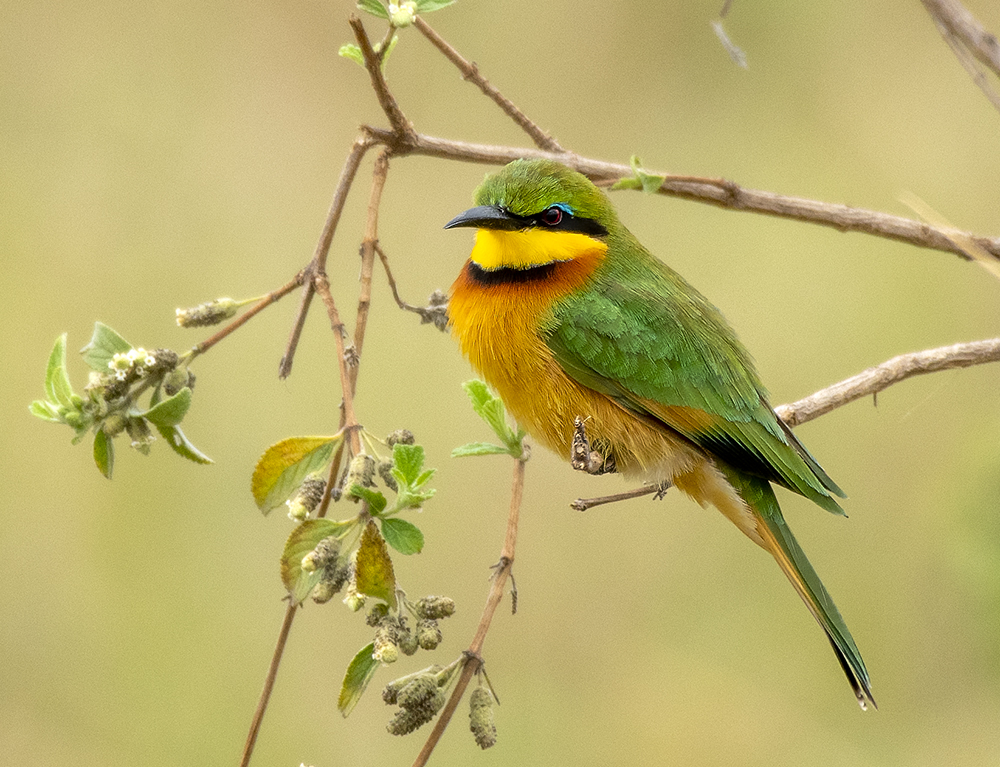
At Maasai Mara, Kenya
