= Nzoia River =

River in Kenya

Coordinates: 0°03′25″N 33°57′11″E

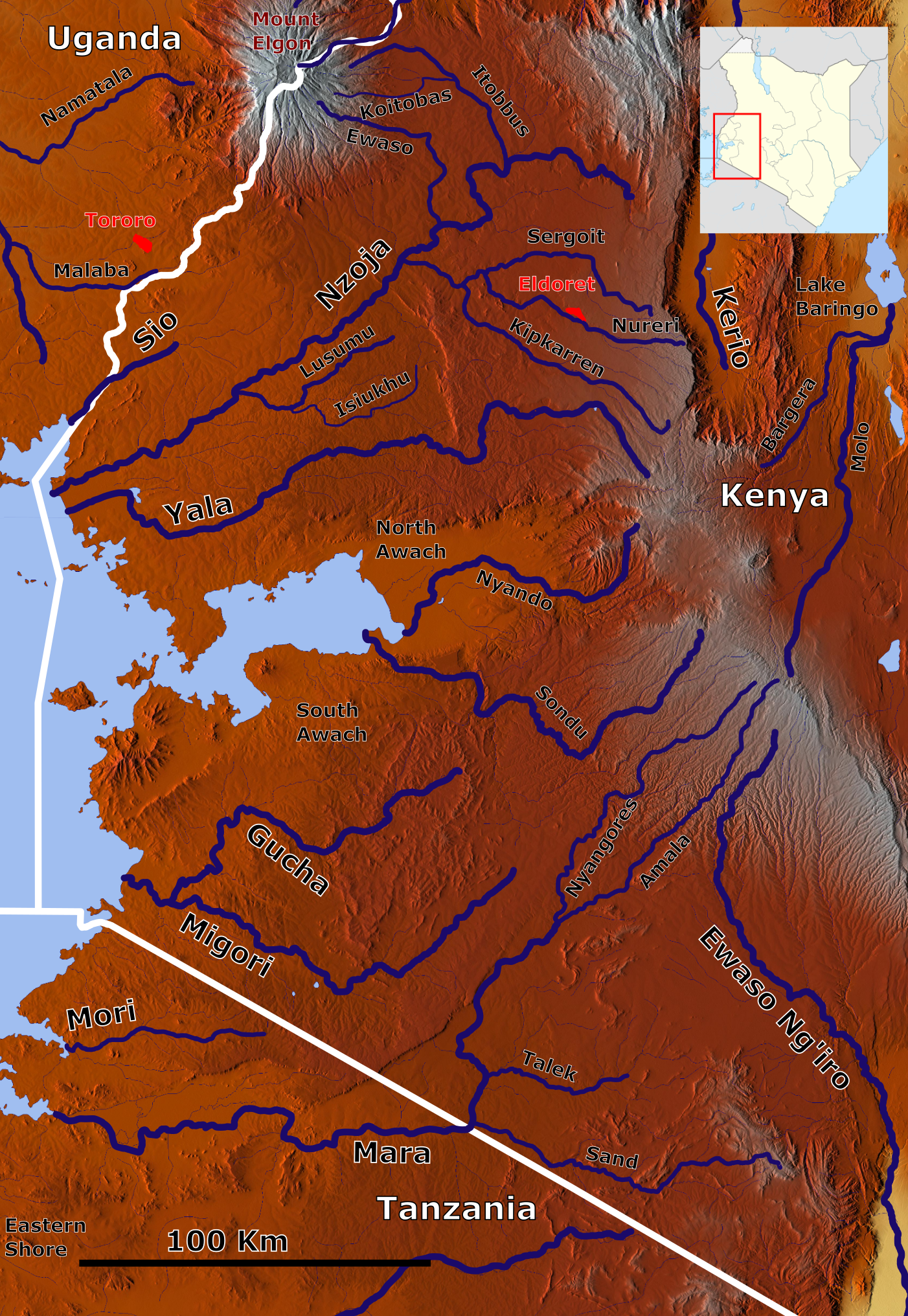
Nzoia River (top left)

The Nzoia River is a 257-kilometre-long (160 mi) Kenyan river, rising from Cherangany hills. It passes through Kapsara, Springer, and Moi's Bridge then crosses to Kakamega County. It flows south and then west, eventually flowing into Lake Victoria near the town of Port Victoria.

The river has a discharge of about 118 m^{3}/s or about 3,721 million cubic metres annually, making it the second biggest river in the country by discharge.

The river is important to Western Kenya, flowing through a region estimated to be populated by over 3.5 million people. Its waters provide irrigation all year round, while the annual floods around the lowland area of Budalang'i deposit sediment that contributes to the area's good agricultural production, albeit displacing hundreds of people and destroying settlements.

Around the industrial region centred at Webuye, the river absorbs a lot of effluent from the paper and sugar factories in the area. The river has a number of waterfalls and possess good hydroelectricity generation potential. The river experiences annual floods at the flat and swampy lower end due to the backflow of Lake Victoria. This leads to perennial humanitarian crisis in the Budalangi flood plains.
