= Petrocephalus simus =

Scientific classification
- Kingdom: Animalia
- Phylum: Chordata
- Class: Actinopterygii
- Order: Osteoglossiformes
- Family: Mormyridae
- Genus: Petrocephalus
- Species: P. simus

Binomial name
- Petrocephalus simus Sauvage, 1883

Synonyms
- Gnathonemus simus Sauvage 1883

Species of fish

Petrocephalus simus is a species of electric fish in the family Mormyridae, found in Guinea Bissau to Angola. It is also widely distributed in the Congo River basin, in the Central African Republic, Cameroon, the Democratic Republic of the Congo, Angola and Zambia.

== Size ==
This species reaches a length of 12.0 cm (4.7 in).
