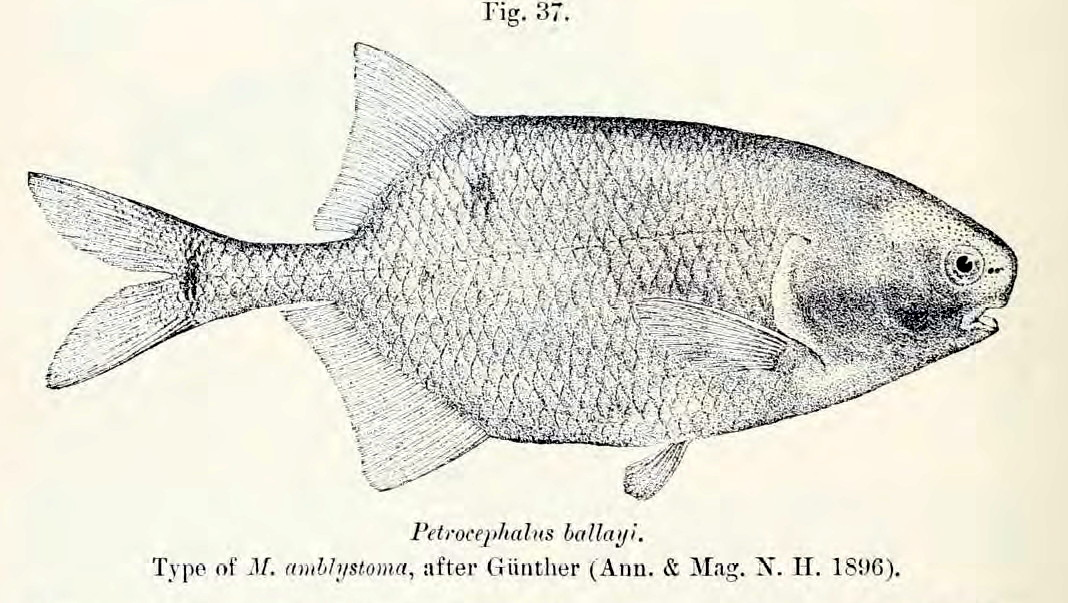
- Petrocephalus balayi, 1883

Scientific classification
- Domain: Eukaryota
- Kingdom: Animalia
- Phylum: Chordata
- Class: Actinopterygii
- Order: Osteoglossiformes
- Family: Mormyridae
- Genus: Petrocephalus
- Species: P. balayi

Binomial name
- Petrocephalus balayi Sauvage, 1883

Synonyms
- Gnathonemus balayi Sauvage 1883

= Petrocephalus balayi =

Species of fish

Petrocephalus balayi is a species of electric fish in the family Mormyridae, found only in the Ogowe River in Gabon and the Congo River basin in Cameroon, Republic of the Congo and the Democratic Republic of the Congo.

== Size ==
This species reaches a length of 11.0 cm (4.3 in).

== Etymology ==
The fish is named in honor of French explorer and colonial administrator Noel Eugene Balay (1847–1902), who collected the holotype specimen.
