= Petrocephalus cunganus =

Scientific classification
- Kingdom: Animalia
- Phylum: Chordata
- Class: Actinopterygii
- Order: Osteoglossiformes
- Family: Mormyridae
- Genus: Petrocephalus
- Species: P. cunganus

Binomial name
- Petrocephalus cunganus Boulenger 1910

Species of fish

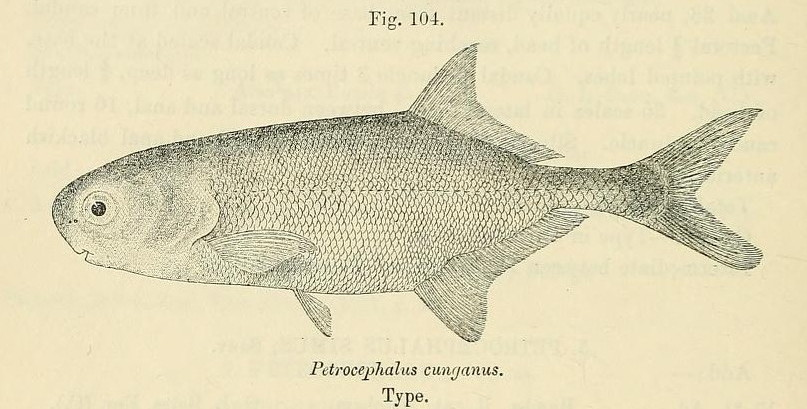
Petrocephalus cunganus

Petrocephalus cunganus is a species of electric fish in the family Mormyridae, found only in the Atlantic coastal Cuanza River in Angola.

== Size ==
This species reaches a length of 11.0 cm (4.3 in).
