= Petrocephalus schoutedeni =

Scientific classification
- Kingdom: Animalia
- Phylum: Chordata
- Class: Actinopterygii
- Order: Osteoglossiformes
- Family: Mormyridae
- Genus: Petrocephalus
- Species: P. schoutedeni

Binomial name
- Petrocephalus schoutedeni Poll, 1954

Species of fish

Petrocephalus schoutedeni is a species of electric fish in the family Mormyridae, found in the coastal basins between Sierra Leone and Côte d'Ivoire, part of the Sassandra River. it is also known from the Niandan River, which is an affluent of the Niger River in Guinea, and also from the upper Cavally River in Liberia, Guinea and Ghana.

== Size ==
This species reaches a length of 9.1 cm (3.6 in).

== Etymology ==
The fish was named after Belgian zoologist Henri Schouteden (1881–1972), who collected many of the new species in the Belgian Congo, for the "tireless work he displayed during his long career in the service of science".
