= Petrocephalus christyi =

Scientific classification
- Kingdom: Animalia
- Phylum: Chordata
- Class: Actinopterygii
- Order: Osteoglossiformes
- Family: Mormyridae
- Genus: Petrocephalus
- Species: P. christyi

Binomial name
- Petrocephalus christyi Boulenger 1920

Species of fish

Petrocephalus christyi is a species of electric fish in the family Mormyridae, found in Africa, being widespread in the Congo River basin, from the rapids just below Pool Malebo to the upper Lualaba, in Central African Republic, Republic of Congo, Democratic Republic of the Congo and Angola.

== Size ==
This species reaches a length of 7.7 cm (3.0 in).

== Etymology ==
Petrocephalus christyi was named after Cuthbert Christy (1863–1932), an English physician who specialized in sleeping sickness, a zoologist, an explorer, and the director of the Congo Museum (Tervuren, Belgium). He collected the holotype specimen.
