= Petrocephalus tenuicauda =

Conservation status
- Least Concern (IUCN 3.1)

Scientific classification
- Kingdom: Animalia
- Phylum: Chordata
- Class: Actinopterygii
- Order: Osteoglossiformes
- Family: Mormyridae
- Genus: Petrocephalus
- Species: P. tenuicauda

Binomial name
- Petrocephalus tenuicauda Steindachner, 1894

Synonyms
- Mormyrus tenuicauda Steindachner, 1894

Species of fish

Petrocephalus tenuicauda is a species of electric fish in the family Mormyridae, found along the Atlantic Guinean slope.

== Size ==
This species reaches a length of 11.3 cm (4.4 in).
