= Petrocephalus sullivani =

Conservation status
- Least Concern (IUCN 3.1)

Scientific classification
- Kingdom: Animalia
- Phylum: Chordata
- Class: Actinopterygii
- Order: Osteoglossiformes
- Family: Mormyridae
- Genus: Petrocephalus
- Species: P. sullivani

Binomial name
- Petrocephalus sullivani Lavoué, C. D. Hopkins & Kamdem Toham 2004

Species of fish

Petrocephalus sullivani is a species of electric fish in the family Mormyridae. It is widespread in Gabon.

== Size ==
This species reaches a length of 9.3 cm (3.7 in).

== Etymology ==
The fish is named in honor of John P. Sullivan (b. 1965), of the Cornell University Museum of Vertebrates in Ithaca, New York, US, because of his contributions to mormyrid systematics.
