= Petrocephalus magnitrunci =

Scientific classification
- Kingdom: Animalia
- Phylum: Chordata
- Class: Actinopterygii
- Order: Osteoglossiformes
- Family: Mormyridae
- Genus: Petrocephalus
- Species: P. magnitrunci

Binomial name
- Petrocephalus magnitrunci B. J. Kramer I. R. Bills, P. H. Skelton & Wink 2012

Species of fish

Petrocephalus magnitrunci is a species of electric fish in the family Mormyridae. It is found in the Boro River in central part of the Okavango Delta. It is also reported from the Okavango in Angola.

== Size ==
This species reaches a length of 8.9 cm (3.5 in).

== Etymology ==
The fish's name means magnus (L.), great; trunci, from truncus, "trunk". The body is described as rounded-oval with an egg-like shape.
