= Petrocephalus grandoculis =

Scientific classification
- Domain: Eukaryota
- Kingdom: Animalia
- Phylum: Chordata
- Class: Actinopterygii
- Order: Osteoglossiformes
- Family: Mormyridae
- Genus: Petrocephalus
- Species: P. grandoculis

Binomial name
- Petrocephalus grandoculis Boulenger 1920

Species of fish

Petrocephalus grandoculis is a species of electric fish in the family Mormyridae, widespread in the lower and middle Congo River basin in the Central African Republic, Democratic Republic of the Congo and the Republic of Congo in Africa.

== Size ==
This species reaches a length of 9.5 cm (3.7 in).
