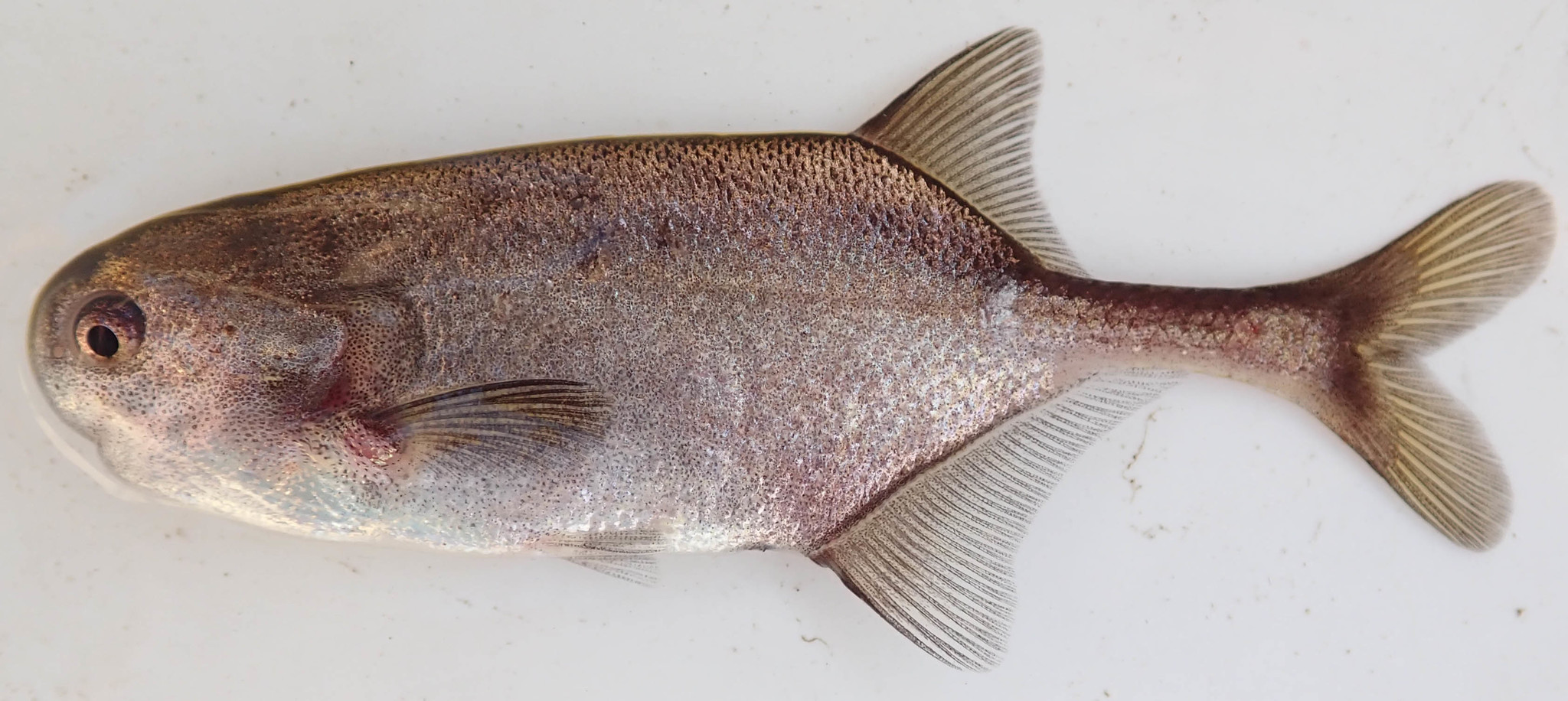
- Petrocephalus okavangensis

Scientific classification
- Kingdom: Animalia
- Phylum: Chordata
- Class: Actinopterygii
- Order: Osteoglossiformes
- Family: Mormyridae
- Genus: Petrocephalus
- Species: P. okavangensis

Binomial name
- Petrocephalus okavangensis B. J. Kramer I. R. Bills, P. H. Skelton & Wink 2012

= Petrocephalus okavangensis =

Species of fish

Petrocephalus okavangensis is a species of electric fish in the family Mormyridae. It is found in the Okavango River drainage system, from the headwaters in Angola in the north, to the Makgadikgadi Salt Pan region in Botswana in the south. It is also reported from the Zambezi in Angola.

== Size ==
This species reaches a length of 9.5 cm (3.7 in).

== Etymology ==
The fish's name denotes a place: the Okavango River drainage, Botswana and Namibia, where it is endemic.
