= Petrocephalus stuhlmanni =

Scientific classification
- Domain: Eukaryota
- Kingdom: Animalia
- Phylum: Chordata
- Class: Actinopterygii
- Order: Osteoglossiformes
- Family: Mormyridae
- Genus: Petrocephalus
- Species: P. stuhlmanni

Binomial name
- Petrocephalus stuhlmanni Boulenger 1909

Species of fish

Petrocephalus stuhlmanni is a species of electric fish in the family Mormyridae, found only in the rivers Ruvu and Wami in Tanzania.

== Size ==
This species reaches a length of 7.9 cm (3.1 in).

== Etymology ==
The fish is named in honor of German zoologist and explorer Franz Ludwig Stuhlmann (1863–1928), who, along with Emin Pascha, led the German East Africa Expedition (1889–1892), during which the holotype specimen was collected.
