= Petrocephalus binotatus =

Scientific classification
- Domain: Eukaryota
- Kingdom: Animalia
- Phylum: Chordata
- Class: Actinopterygii
- Order: Osteoglossiformes
- Family: Mormyridae
- Genus: Petrocephalus
- Species: P. binotatus

Binomial name
- Petrocephalus binotatus Pellegrin, 1924

Synonyms
- Gnathonemus binotatus Pellegrin 1924

Species of fish

Petrocephalus binotatus is a species of electric fish in the family Mormyridae, found in the middle Congo River basin, from Pool Malebo up to the Wagenia Falls in the Democratic Republic of the Congo.

== Size ==
This species reaches a length of 10.0 cm (3.9 in).
