= Petrocephalus balteatus =

Scientific classification
- Domain: Eukaryota
- Kingdom: Animalia
- Phylum: Chordata
- Class: Actinopterygii
- Order: Osteoglossiformes
- Family: Mormyridae
- Genus: Petrocephalus
- Species: P. balteatus

Binomial name
- Petrocephalus balteatus Rochebrune, 1885

Synonyms
- Gnathonemus balteatus Sauvage 1883

Species of fish

Petrocephalus balteatus, is a species of electric fish in the family Mormyridae.
