= Petrocephalus ansorgii =

Conservation status
- Least Concern (IUCN 3.1)

Scientific classification
- Kingdom: Animalia
- Phylum: Chordata
- Class: Actinopterygii
- Order: Osteoglossiformes
- Family: Mormyridae
- Genus: Petrocephalus
- Species: P. ansorgii

Binomial name
- Petrocephalus ansorgii Boulenger 1903

Species of fish

Petrocephalus ansorgii, the Agberi mormyrid, is a species of electric fish in the family Mormyridae, found in Africa: on the Upper and Lower Niger, the Bénuoé, and the coastal rivers of Nigeria.

== Size ==
This species reaches a length of 14.1 cm (5.6 in).

== Etymology ==
The fish is named in honor of English explorer and collector William John Ansorge (1850–1913), who collected the holotype specimen.
