= Petrocephalus steindachneri =

Scientific classification
- Kingdom: Animalia
- Phylum: Chordata
- Class: Actinopterygii
- Order: Osteoglossiformes
- Family: Mormyridae
- Genus: Petrocephalus
- Species: P. steindachneri

Binomial name
- Petrocephalus steindachneri Fowler, 1958

Species of fish

Petrocephalus steindachneri is a species of electric fish in the family Mormyridae. It is native to the Rufuji River system in Tanzania.

== Size ==
This species reaches a length of 6.6 cm (2.6 in).

== Etymology ==
The fish was named after Austrian ichthyologist Franz Steindachner (1834–1919), who had described this species in 1914 but used a preoccupied name, P. affinis Sauvage 1879 (Stomatorhinus walkeri).
