= Petrocephalus hutereaui =

Scientific classification
- Kingdom: Animalia
- Phylum: Chordata
- Class: Actinopterygii
- Order: Osteoglossiformes
- Family: Mormyridae
- Genus: Petrocephalus
- Species: P. hutereaui

Binomial name
- Petrocephalus hutereaui (Boulenger 1913)

Synonyms
- Marcusenius hutereaui Boulenger 1913

Species of fish

Petrocephalus hutereaui is a species of electric fish in the family Mormyridae, Africa. It is only known from the type locality in the Uélé system of the middle Congo River basin in the Democratic Republic of the Congo.

== Size ==
This species reaches a length of 6.0 cm (2.4 in).

== Etymology ==
The fish is named in honor of Belgian army officer Armand Hutereau (1875–1914), head of a Belgian ethnographic mission to the Congo, who supplied this fish.
