= Petrocephalus similis =

Scientific classification
- Kingdom: Animalia
- Phylum: Chordata
- Class: Actinopterygii
- Division: Teleostei
- Order: Osteoglossiformes
- Family: Mormyridae
- Genus: Petrocephalus
- Species: P. similis

Binomial name
- Petrocephalus similis Lavoué, 2011

Species of fish

Petrocephalus similis is a species of electric fish in the family Mormyridae, found in the Djérem River, in the upper Sanaga basin in Cameroon.

== Size ==
This species reaches a length of 11.9 cm (4.7 in).

== Etymology ==
The Latin similis means "like" or "resembling", referring to its resemblance to P. sullivani.
