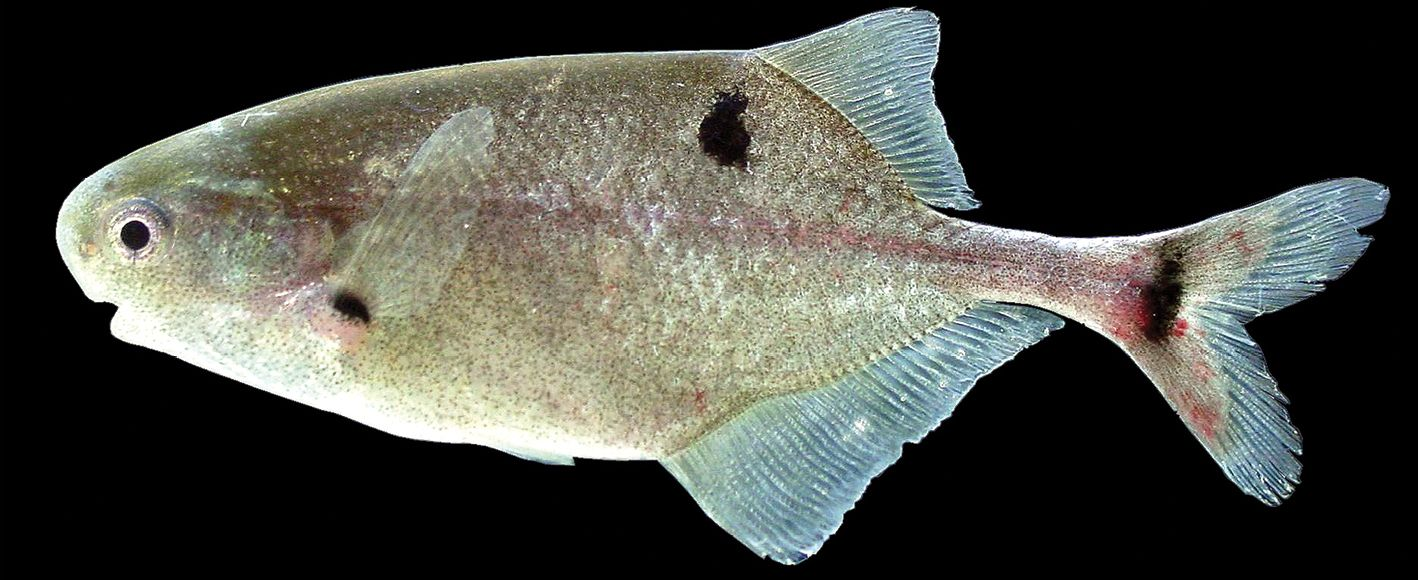
- Paratype from Odzala-Kokoua National Park, Congo River, Republic of the Congo

Scientific classification
- Kingdom: Animalia
- Phylum: Chordata
- Class: Actinopterygii
- Order: Osteoglossiformes
- Family: Mormyridae
- Genus: Petrocephalus
- Species: P. arnegardi

Binomial name
- Petrocephalus arnegardi Lavoué & Sullivan, 2014

= Petrocephalus arnegardi =

Species of fish

Petrocephalus arnegardi is a species of electric fish in the genus Petrocephalus which is native to the Central Congo River basin. It is found in the middle Congo River and in the Likouala River drainage, in the Democratic Republic of the Congo and Republic of the Congo.

== Etymology ==
It is named after Matthew E. Arnegard (b. 1967), an expert on elephantfishes.

== Description ==
Petrocephalus arnegardi grow to 9 cm (3.5 in) SL. It is a silvery white fish with three distinct bilateral melanin marks: one slightly anterior to the dorsal fin, another at the base of the pectoral fin, and one centered at the base of the caudal fin. The mouth is small and subterminal.
