= Petrocephalus squalostoma =

Scientific classification
- Domain: Eukaryota
- Kingdom: Animalia
- Phylum: Chordata
- Class: Actinopterygii
- Order: Osteoglossiformes
- Family: Mormyridae
- Genus: Petrocephalus
- Species: P. squalostoma

Binomial name
- Petrocephalus squalostoma (Boulenger 1915)

Synonyms
- Marcusenius squalostoma Boulenger 1915; Pollimyrus squalostoma (Boulenger, 1915)

Species of fish

Petrocephalus squalostoma is a species of electric fish in the family Mormyridae, found only in the upper Congo River basin; the Lukinda River a Lake Mweru tributary in Democratic Republic of the Congo, and the Luapula River system as far up as the Chambeshi River in Zambia.

== Size ==
This species reaches a length of 12.2 cm (4.8 in).
