= Petrocephalus longianalis =

Scientific classification
- Kingdom: Animalia
- Phylum: Chordata
- Class: Actinopterygii
- Order: Osteoglossiformes
- Family: Mormyridae
- Genus: Petrocephalus
- Species: P. longianalis

Binomial name
- Petrocephalus longianalis B. J. Kramer I. R. Bills, P. H. Skelton & Wink 2012

Species of fish

Petrocephalus longianalis is a species of electric fish in the family Mormyridae. It is found in the lower and upper Luapula River system in Zambia.

== Size ==
This species reaches a length of 11.9 cm (4.7 in).

== Etymology ==
The fish's name means longus (L.), "long"; analis (L.), "anal", referring to higher number of anal-fin rays (30–35) compared with congeners covered in the authors' study.
