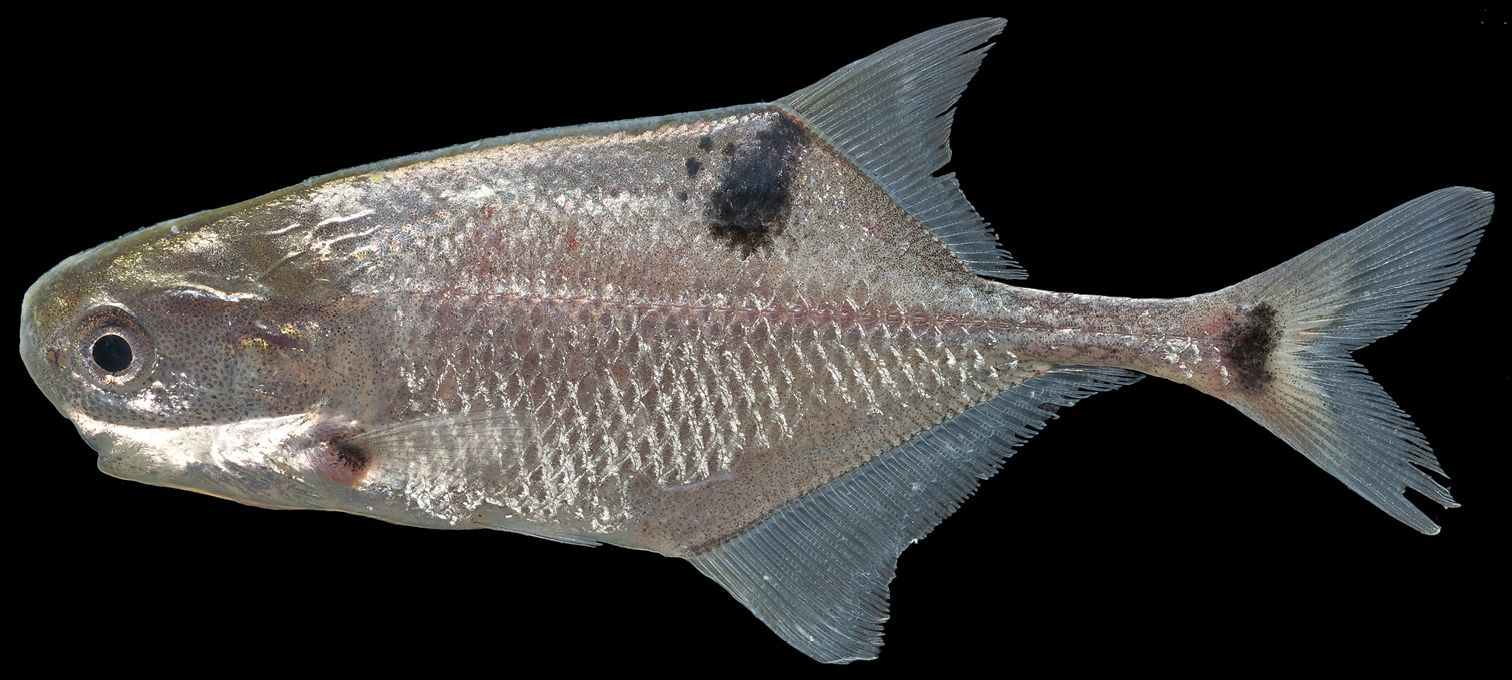
- Holotype from Yangambi, Congo River, Democratic Republic of Congo

Scientific classification
- Kingdom: Animalia
- Phylum: Chordata
- Class: Actinopterygii
- Order: Osteoglossiformes
- Family: Mormyridae
- Genus: Petrocephalus
- Species: P. boboto

Binomial name
- Petrocephalus boboto Lavoué & Sullivan, 2014

= Petrocephalus boboto =

Species of fish

Petrocephalus boboto is a species of electric fish in the genus Petrocephalus. It is so far only known from the holotype collected from Congo River at Yangambi, the Democratic Republic of the Congo. The specific name, boboto, is the Lingala word for "peace".

== Description ==
The Petrocephalus arnegardi holotype measures 5.7 cm (2.2 in) SL. It is a gray/silvery fish with metallic reflection on the flanks and head. There are three distinct black marks on each side of the body: one at the base of the pectoral fins, one at the base of the caudal fin, and one below the first anterior rays of the dorsal fin. The mouth is small and subterminal.
