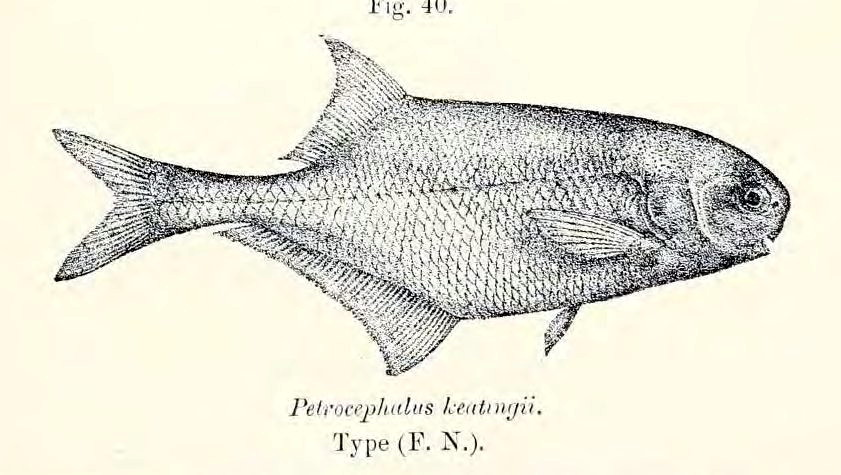

Scientific classification
- Domain: Eukaryota
- Kingdom: Animalia
- Phylum: Chordata
- Class: Actinopterygii
- Order: Osteoglossiformes
- Family: Mormyridae
- Genus: Petrocephalus
- Species: P. keatingii

Binomial name
- Petrocephalus keatingii Boulenger 1901

= Petrocephalus keatingii =

Species of fish

Petrocephalus keatingii is a species of electric fish in the family Mormyridae, found only from the White Nile between Sobat confluence and Khartoum.

== Size ==
This species reaches a length of 12.0 cm (4.7 in).

== Etymology ==
The fish is named in honor of British military surgeon Henry Porringer Keatinge (1861–1928), the director of the Government School of Medicine, in Cairo.
