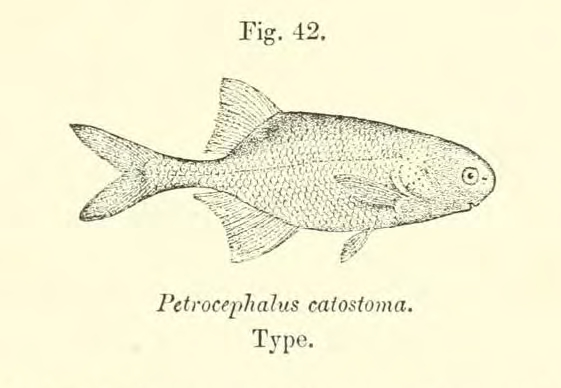

Scientific classification
- Kingdom: Animalia
- Phylum: Chordata
- Class: Actinopterygii
- Order: Osteoglossiformes
- Family: Mormyridae
- Genus: Petrocephalus
- Species: P. catostoma

Binomial name
- Petrocephalus catostoma (Günther, 1866)

Synonyms
- Mormyrus catostoma Günther 1866

= Petrocephalus catostoma =

Churchill

Species of fish

Petrocephalus catostoma, the Churchill, is a species of electric fish in the family Mormyridae, found in the Rovuma River system including the Niassa Reserve, and the western confluences to Lake Malawi.

== Size ==
This species reaches a length of 15.0 cm (5.9 in).
