= Petrocephalus magnoculis =

Scientific classification
- Kingdom: Animalia
- Phylum: Chordata
- Class: Actinopterygii
- Order: Osteoglossiformes
- Family: Mormyridae
- Genus: Petrocephalus
- Species: P. magnoculis

Binomial name
- Petrocephalus magnoculis B. J. Kramer I. R. Bills, P. H. Skelton & Wink 2012

Species of fish

Petrocephalus magnoculis is a species of electric fish in the family Mormyridae. It is found in the Cunene River below the Ruacana Falls in Namibia and Angola.

== Size ==
This species reaches a length of 10.9 cm (4.3 in).

== Etymology ==
The fish's name means magnus (L.), "great"; oculus (L.), "eye", referring to its large eye diameter (25.9–32.9% of the head length).
