= Petrocephalus pellegrini =

Scientific classification
- Kingdom: Animalia
- Phylum: Chordata
- Class: Actinopterygii
- Order: Osteoglossiformes
- Family: Mormyridae
- Genus: Petrocephalus
- Species: P. pellegrini

Binomial name
- Petrocephalus pellegrini Poll, 1941

Species of fish

Petrocephalus pellegrini is a species of electric fish in the family Mormyridae, found in the coastal basins between Sierra Leone and Côte d'Ivoire, part of the Sassandra River. it is also known from the Niandan River, which is an affluent of the Niger River in Guinea, and also from the upper Cavally River in Liberia, Guinea and Ghana.

== Size ==
This species reaches a length of 9.1 cm (3.6 in).

== Etymology ==
The fish is named in honor of French ichthyologist Jacques Pellegrin (1873–1944), author of the book Poissons des eaux douces de l'Afrique occidentale.
