= Petrocephalus longicapitis =

Scientific classification
- Kingdom: Animalia
- Phylum: Chordata
- Class: Actinopterygii
- Order: Osteoglossiformes
- Family: Mormyridae
- Genus: Petrocephalus
- Species: P. longicapitis

Binomial name
- Petrocephalus longicapitis B. J. Kramer I. R. Bills, P. H. Skelton & Wink 2012

Species of fish

Petrocephalus longicapitis is a species of electric fish in the family Mormyridae. It is found in the upper and middle Zambezi River, and in the Okavango in Angola.

== Size ==
This species reaches a length of 11.0 cm (4.3 in).

== Etymology ==
The fish's name means longus (L.), "long"; capitis (L.), "of the head", referring to its long head length (25.8– 29.6% of SL).
