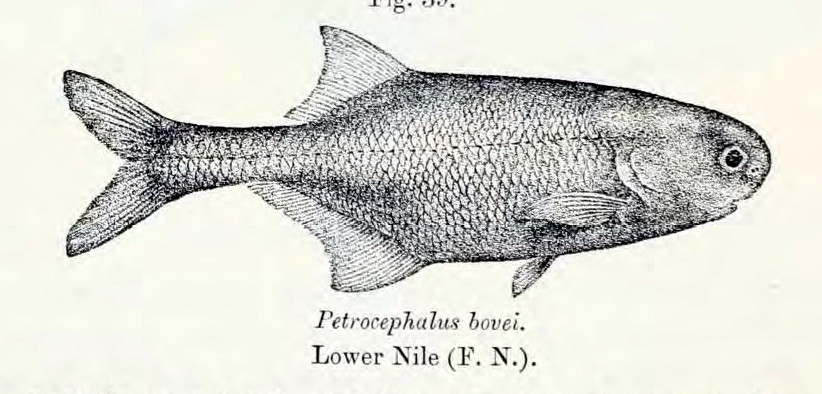

Scientific classification
- Domain: Eukaryota
- Kingdom: Animalia
- Phylum: Chordata
- Class: Actinopterygii
- Order: Osteoglossiformes
- Family: Mormyridae
- Genus: Petrocephalus
- Species: P. bovei

Binomial name
- Petrocephalus bovei (Valenciennes, 1847)

Synonyms
- Mormyrus bovei Valenciennes 1847

= Petrocephalus bovei =

baby whale

Species of fish

Petrocephalus bovei is a species of electric fish in the family Mormyridae, known from Côte d'Ivoire, also found in Chad, Niger, Volta River, Gambia and Senegal basins, including the Nile.

== Size ==
This species reaches a length of 11.5 cm (4.5 in).

== Etymology ==
The fish is named in honor of Nicolas Bové (1812–1841), a Luxembourgian gardener, botanist and collector who supplied the type specimen material to the Muséum National d'Histoire Naturelle in Paris.
