= Petrocephalus microphthalmus =

Scientific classification
- Kingdom: Animalia
- Phylum: Chordata
- Class: Actinopterygii
- Order: Osteoglossiformes
- Family: Mormyridae
- Genus: Petrocephalus
- Species: P. microphthalmus

Binomial name
- Petrocephalus microphthalmus Pellegrin, 1909

Species of fish

Petrocephalus microphthalmus is a species of electric fish in the family Mormyridae, found in the Sanaga River in the north to the more southern Kouilou-Niari River, including the rivers Ntem and Ogowe. It is also found in the middle Congo River basin, downstream up to the lower Congo River near Brazzaville and southwards towards Angola.

== Size ==
This species reaches a length of 5.2 cm (2.0 in).
