= Petrocephalus leo =

Scientific classification
- Domain: Eukaryota
- Kingdom: Animalia
- Phylum: Chordata
- Class: Actinopterygii
- Order: Osteoglossiformes
- Family: Mormyridae
- Genus: Petrocephalus
- Species: P. leo

Binomial name
- Petrocephalus leo Lavoué, 2016

Synonyms
- Gnathonemus leo Pellegrin 1924

Species of fish

Petrocephalus leo is a species of electric fish in the family Mormyridae, found in the lower Kotto River, a Ubangui River tributary of the middle Congo River basin in the Central African Republic.

== Size ==
This species reaches a length of 7.9 cm (3.1 in).

== Etymology ==
The fish is named in honor of Lavoué's son.
