= Petrocephalus petersi =

Scientific classification
- Kingdom: Animalia
- Phylum: Chordata
- Class: Actinopterygii
- Order: Osteoglossiformes
- Family: Mormyridae
- Genus: Petrocephalus
- Species: P. petersi

Binomial name
- Petrocephalus petersi B. J. Kramer I. R. Bills, P. H. Skelton & Wink 2012

Species of fish

Petrocephalus petersi is a species of electric fish in the family Mormyridae. It is found in the Zambezi River Delta and the Melela River.

== Size ==
This species reaches a length of 7.3 cm (2.9 in).

== Etymology ==
The fish is named in honor of German zoologist and explorer Wilhelm Peters (1815–1883), who conducted the first major fish survey of the lower Zambezi region in 1842–1848 and is credited with discovering many endemics and other more-widespread species.
