= Petrocephalus degeni =

Scientific classification
- Kingdom: Animalia
- Phylum: Chordata
- Class: Actinopterygii
- Order: Osteoglossiformes
- Family: Mormyridae
- Genus: Petrocephalus
- Species: P. degeni

Binomial name
- Petrocephalus degeni Boulenger 1906

Species of fish

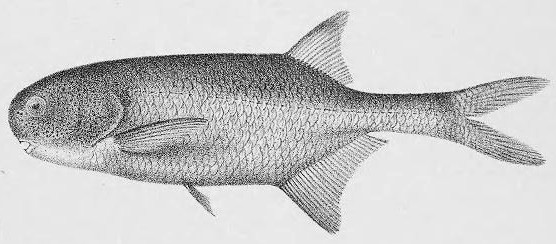
Petrocephalus degeni

Petrocephalus degeni is a species of electric fish in the family Mormyridae, found in Africa, in both the Katonga River and Lake Victoria.

== Size ==
This species reaches a length of 8.1 cm (3.2 in).

== Etymology ==
The fish is named in honor of Swiss ornithologist Edward Degen (1852–1923), who "utilized his leisure" time while serving as an assistant to Prof. Edward Alfred Minchin in Uganda and collected the holotype specimen.
