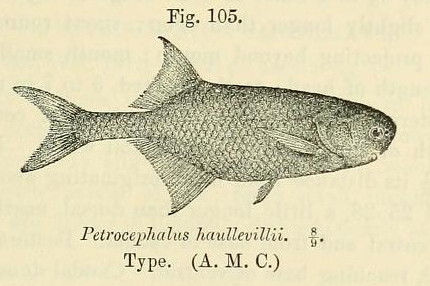

Scientific classification
- Domain: Eukaryota
- Kingdom: Animalia
- Phylum: Chordata
- Class: Actinopterygii
- Order: Osteoglossiformes
- Family: Mormyridae
- Genus: Petrocephalus
- Species: P. haullevillii

Binomial name
- Petrocephalus haullevillii Boulenger 1912

= Petrocephalus haullevillii =

Species of fish

Petrocephalus haullevillii is a species of electric fish in the family Mormyridae, found only in Africa and only in the Kouilou-Niari and Chiloango River basins.

== Size ==
This species reaches a length of 7.0 cm (2.8 in).

== Etymology ==
The fish was named after Alphonse de Haulleville (1860–1938) who was the director of the Congo Museum (Tervuren, Belgium).
