= Petrocephalus odzalaensis =

Scientific classification
- Kingdom: Animalia
- Phylum: Chordata
- Class: Actinopterygii
- Order: Osteoglossiformes
- Family: Mormyridae
- Genus: Petrocephalus
- Species: P. odzalaensis

Binomial name
- Petrocephalus odzalaensis Lavoué & Sullivan, & Arnegard, 2010

Species of fish

Petrocephalus odzalaensis is a species of weakly electric fish in the family Mormyridae, commonly known as elephantfishes. This species was described in 2010 by Lavoué, Sullivan, and Arnegard.

== Description ==
Petrocephalus odzalaensis is distinguished by its unique combination of morphological features. It has a dorsal fin with a maximum of 22 branched rays and an anal fin with a minimum of 27 branched rays. The mouth is sub-terminal, with the ratio between head length and mouth position ranging between 4.2 and 5.01. The eye is small, with the ratio of head length to eye diameter between 3.7 and 4.2. The body is pinkish-gray, darker dorsally, with three distinct pigmentation patches: an ovoid black mark below the anterior base of the dorsal fin on each side of the body, a small black mark at the base of each pectoral fin, and an ovoid black mark at the base of the caudal fin.

== Size ==
This species reaches a length of 9.9 cm (3.9 in).

== Habitat ==
Petrocephalus odzalaensis is found in the Congo River basin, specifically in the Likouala drainage in the Republic of Congo and the Ruki drainage and Lukenie basin in the Democratic Republic of the Congo. It inhabits freshwater environments and is benthopelagic, meaning it lives near the bottom of the water body.

== Discovery ==
The species was named in honor of Odzala National Park, where it was first discovered. The name "odzalaensis" reflects its association with this protected area.

== Aquarium care ==
While Petrocephalus odzalaensis is not commonly kept in aquariums, it would require similar care to other species in the Mormyridae family. This would include maintaining a tropical freshwater environment with appropriate water parameters, providing hiding spots and a substrate that mimics its natural habitat, and offering a varied diet.

== Conservation status ==
Petrocephalus odzalaensis has not been evaluated by the IUCN Red List, and there is no specific conservation status assigned to this species.
