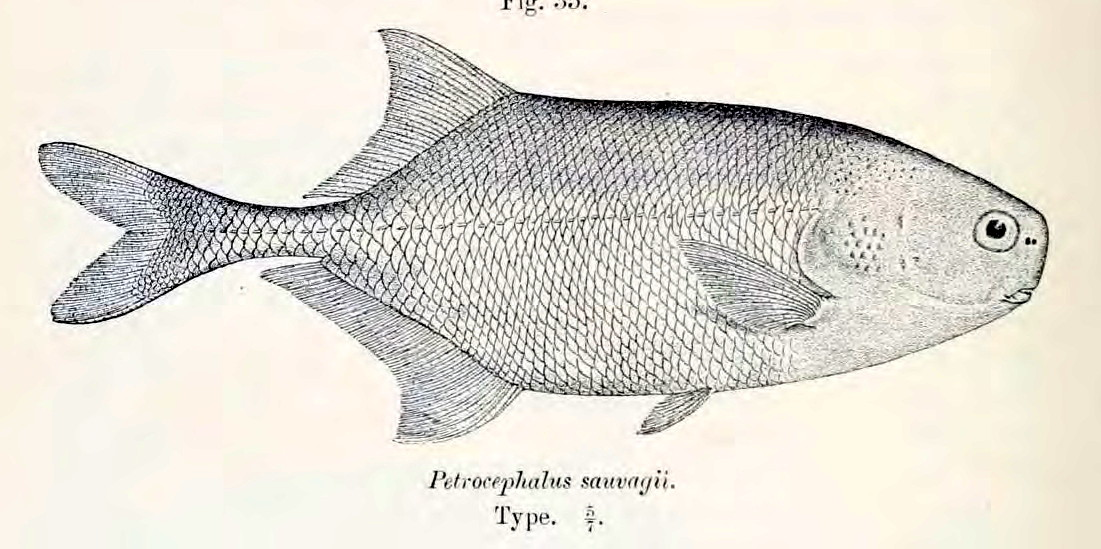
- Petrocephalus sauvagii (Boulenger, c.1887)

Scientific classification
- Domain: Eukaryota
- Kingdom: Animalia
- Phylum: Chordata
- Class: Actinopterygii
- Order: Osteoglossiformes
- Family: Mormyridae
- Genus: Petrocephalus
- Species: P. sauvagii

Binomial name
- Petrocephalus sauvagii (Boulenger 1887)

Synonyms
- Mormyrus sauvagii Boulenger 1887

= Petrocephalus sauvagii =

Species of fish

Petrocephalus sauvagii is a species of electric fish in the family Mormyridae, found in the Congo River basin and Niger Delta in Africa.

== Size ==
This species reaches a length of 17.5 cm (6.9 in).

== Etymology ==
The fish is named in honor of French zoologist Henri Émile Sauvage (1842–1917).
