= Petrocephalus gliroides =

Scientific classification
- Domain: Eukaryota
- Kingdom: Animalia
- Phylum: Chordata
- Class: Actinopterygii
- Order: Osteoglossiformes
- Family: Mormyridae
- Genus: Petrocephalus
- Species: P. gliroides

Binomial name
- Petrocephalus gliroides (Vinciguerra 1897)

Synonyms
- Mormyrus gliroides Vinciguerra, 1897

Species of fish

Petrocephalus gliroides is a species of weakly electric fish in the family Mormyridae, commonly known as elephantfishes. This species was first described in 1897 by Vinciguerra.

== Description ==
Petrocephalus gliroides is distinguished by its unique combination of morphological features. It has a dorsal fin with 18–19 branched rays and an anal fin with 27–28 branched rays. The fish has a large eye, with the ratio of head length to eye diameter ranging between 3.2 and 3.5. The mouth is large, with the ratio of head length to mouth width between 2.0 and 3.7. Additionally, it has 15–21 teeth in the upper jaw and 24–30 teeth in the lower jaw. The pigmentation pattern includes two distinctive melanin markings: a distinct ovoid mark below the anterior base of the dorsal fin and a crescent-like mark at the base of the caudal fin.

== Size ==
This species reaches a length of 15.0 cm (5.9 in).

== Habitat ==
Petrocephalus gliroides is found in the Congo River basin, specifically in the Ganana River in the Democratic Republic of the Congo. It inhabits freshwater environments and is benthopelagic, meaning it lives near the bottom of the water body.

== Discovery ==
The species was named in honor of the Ganana River, where it was first discovered. The name "gliroides" reflects its association with this river system.

== Aquarium care ==
While Petrocephalus gliroides is not commonly kept in aquariums, it would require similar care to other species in the Mormyridae family. This would include maintaining a tropical freshwater environment with appropriate water parameters, providing hiding spots and a substrate that mimics its natural habitat, and offering a varied diet.

== Conservation status ==
Petrocephalus gliroides has not been evaluated by the IUCN Red List, and there is no specific conservation status assigned to this species.
