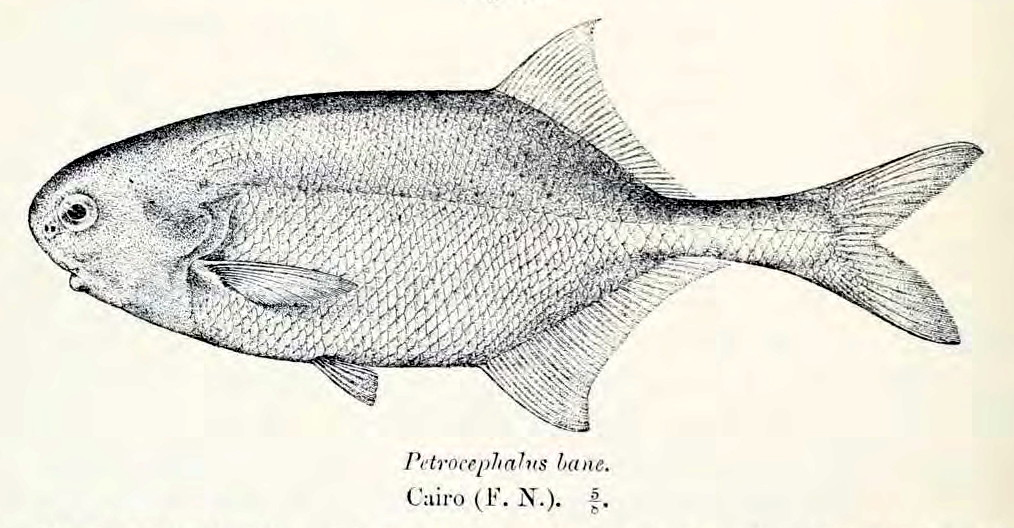

Scientific classification
- Kingdom: Animalia
- Phylum: Chordata
- Class: Actinopterygii
- Division: Teleostei
- Order: Osteoglossiformes
- Family: Mormyridae
- Genus: Petrocephalus
- Species: P. bane

Binomial name
- Petrocephalus bane (Lacépède, 1803)

Synonyms
- Mormyrus bane Lacépède, 1803; Petrocephalus bane bane (Lacépède, 1803); Petrocephalus bane ansorgii (Boulenger, 1903); Petrocephalus bane tchadensis Blache & Miton, 1961; Petrocephalus bane comoensis de Merona, 1979

= Petrocephalus bane =

Species of fish

Petrocephalus bane is a species of elephantfish native to Africa where it occurs in the basins of the Nile, Bénoué and Volta rivers and the Chad Basin. It prefers relatively still waters of lakes, irrigation canals and lagoons. This species can reach a length of 20 centimetres (7.9 in) SL. It can also be found in the aquarium trade.
