= Petrocephalus valentini =

Scientific classification
- Kingdom: Animalia
- Phylum: Chordata
- Class: Actinopterygii
- Division: Teleostei
- Order: Osteoglossiformes
- Family: Mormyridae
- Genus: Petrocephalus
- Species: P. valentini

Binomial name
- Petrocephalus valentini Sébastien Lavoué & Sullivan, & Matthew E. Arnegard, 2010

Species of fish

Petrocephalus valentini is a species of weakly electric fish in the family Mormyridae, commonly known as elephantfishes. This species was described in 2010 by Lavoué, Sullivan, and Arnegard.

== Description ==
Petrocephalus valentini is distinguished by its unique combination of morphological features. It has a dorsal fin with 19–24 branched rays and an anal fin with 24–26 branched rays. The fish has a large eye, with the ratio of head length to eye diameter ranging between 2.9 and 3.2. The mouth is very small, with the ratio of head length to mouth width between 4.7 and 5.8. Additionally, it has 12 teeth or fewer in the upper jaw and 17 teeth or fewer in the lower jaw. The pigmentation pattern includes subtle marks: a pale dorsal black mark on each side of the body below the anterior base of the dorsal fin, and an ovoid mark at the base of the caudal fin.

== Size ==
This species reaches a length of 7.7 cm (3.0 in).

== Habitat ==
Petrocephalus valentini is found in the Congo River basin, specifically in the Likouala River in the Republic of Congo and the vicinity of the Pool Malebo in the Lower Congo River. It inhabits freshwater environments and is benthopelagic, meaning it lives near the bottom of the water body.

== Discovery ==
The species was named in honor of Valentin Mbossi, a dedicated worker at Odzala National Park. The name "valentini" was chosen to reflect appreciation for his contributions and to avoid confusion with a similarly named species, Petrocephalus mbossou.

== Aquarium care ==
While Petrocephalus valentini is not commonly kept in aquariums, it would require similar care to other species in the Mormyridae family. This would include maintaining a tropical freshwater environment with appropriate water parameters, providing hiding spots and a substrate that mimics its natural habitat, and offering a varied diet.

== Conservation status ==
Petrocephalus valentini has not been evaluated by the IUCN Red List, and there is no specific conservation status assigned to this species.
