= Petrocephalus mbossou =

Scientific classification
- Kingdom: Animalia
- Phylum: Chordata
- Class: Actinopterygii
- Order: Osteoglossiformes
- Family: Mormyridae
- Genus: Petrocephalus
- Species: P. mbossou

Binomial name
- Petrocephalus mbossou Lavoué & Sullivan, & Arnegard, 2010

Species of fish

Petrocephalus mbossou is a species of weakly electric fish in the family Mormyridae, commonly known as elephantfishes. This species was described in 2010 by Lavoué, Sullivan, and Arnegard.

== Description ==
Petrocephalus mbossou is distinguished by its unique combination of morphological features. It has a dorsal fin with 22–24 branched rays and an anal fin with 26–28 branched rays. The mouth is inferior and small, with the ratio of head length to mouth width between 4.2 and 5.1. It has 9-11 teeth in a single row in the upper jaw and 14–22 teeth in a single row in the lower jaw. The pigmentation pattern includes two black markings on each side of the body: an irregular patch below the anterior base of the dorsal fin and an irregularly-shaped mark at the base of the caudal fin.

== Size ==
This species reaches a length of 12.7 cm (5.0 in).

== Habitat ==
Petrocephalus mbossou is found in the Congo River basin, specifically in the Lékoli River (a tributary of the Likouala River) in the Republic of Congo and the Ubangui River in the Central African Republic. It inhabits freshwater environments and is benthopelagic, meaning it lives near the bottom of the water body.

== Discovery ==
The species was named in honor of the local name given to Petrocephalus in the Lingala language, where speakers recognize Petrocephalus as a natural group and call it "mbossou".

== Aquarium care ==
While Petrocephalus mbossou is not commonly kept in aquariums, it would require similar care to other species in the family Mormyridae. This would include maintaining a tropical freshwater environment with appropriate water parameters, providing hiding spots and a substrate that mimics its natural habitat, and offering a varied diet.

== Conservation status ==
Petrocephalus mbossou has not been evaluated by the IUCN Red List, and there is no specific conservation status assigned to this species.
