= Trichiurichthys =

Scientific classification
- Kingdom: Animalia
- Phylum: Chordata
- Class: Actinopterygii
- Order: Gadiformes
- Genus: †Trichiurichthys; Sauvage, 1873

Extinct genus of fishes

Trichiurichthys is an extinct genus of prehistoric ray-finned fish.

== See also ==
- Prehistoric fish
- List of prehistoric bony fish
