= Petrocephalus congicus =

Scientific classification
- Kingdom: Animalia
- Phylum: Chordata
- Class: Actinopterygii
- Order: Osteoglossiformes
- Family: Mormyridae
- Genus: Petrocephalus
- Species: P. congicus

Binomial name
- Petrocephalus congicus L. R. David & Poll, 1937

Species of fish

Petrocephalus congicus is a species of weakly electric fish in the family Mormyridae, commonly known as elephantfishes. This species was described in 1937 by L. R. David and Poll.

== Description ==
Petrocephalus congicus is distinguished by its unique combination of morphological features. It has a dorsal fin with 18-19 branched rays and an anal fin with 27-28 branched rays. The fish has a large eye, with the ratio of head length to eye diameter ranging between 3.2 and 3.51. The mouth is large, with the ratio of head length to mouth width between 2.0 and 3.7. Additionally, it has 15-21 teeth in the upper jaw and 24-30 teeth in the lower jaw. The pigmentation pattern includes two distinctive melanin markings: a distinct ovoid mark below the anterior base of the dorsal fin and a crescent-like mark at the base of the caudal fin.

== Size ==
This species reaches a length of 9.0 cm (3.5 in).

== Habitat ==
Petrocephalus congicus is found in the Congo River basin, specifically in the middle Congo River, upper Lomami River, and lower Lualaba River in the Democratic Republic of the Congo. It inhabits freshwater environments and is benthopelagic, meaning it lives near the bottom of the water body.

== Discovery ==
The species was named in honor of the Congo River, where it was first discovered. The name "congicus" reflects its association with this major river system.

== Aquarium care ==
While Petrocephalus congicus is not commonly kept in aquariums, it would require similar care to other species in the Mormyridae family. This would include maintaining a tropical freshwater environment with appropriate water parameters, providing hiding spots and a substrate that mimics its natural habitat, and offering a varied diet.

== Conservation status ==
Petrocephalus congicus has not been evaluated by the IUCN Red List, and there is no specific conservation status assigned to this species.
