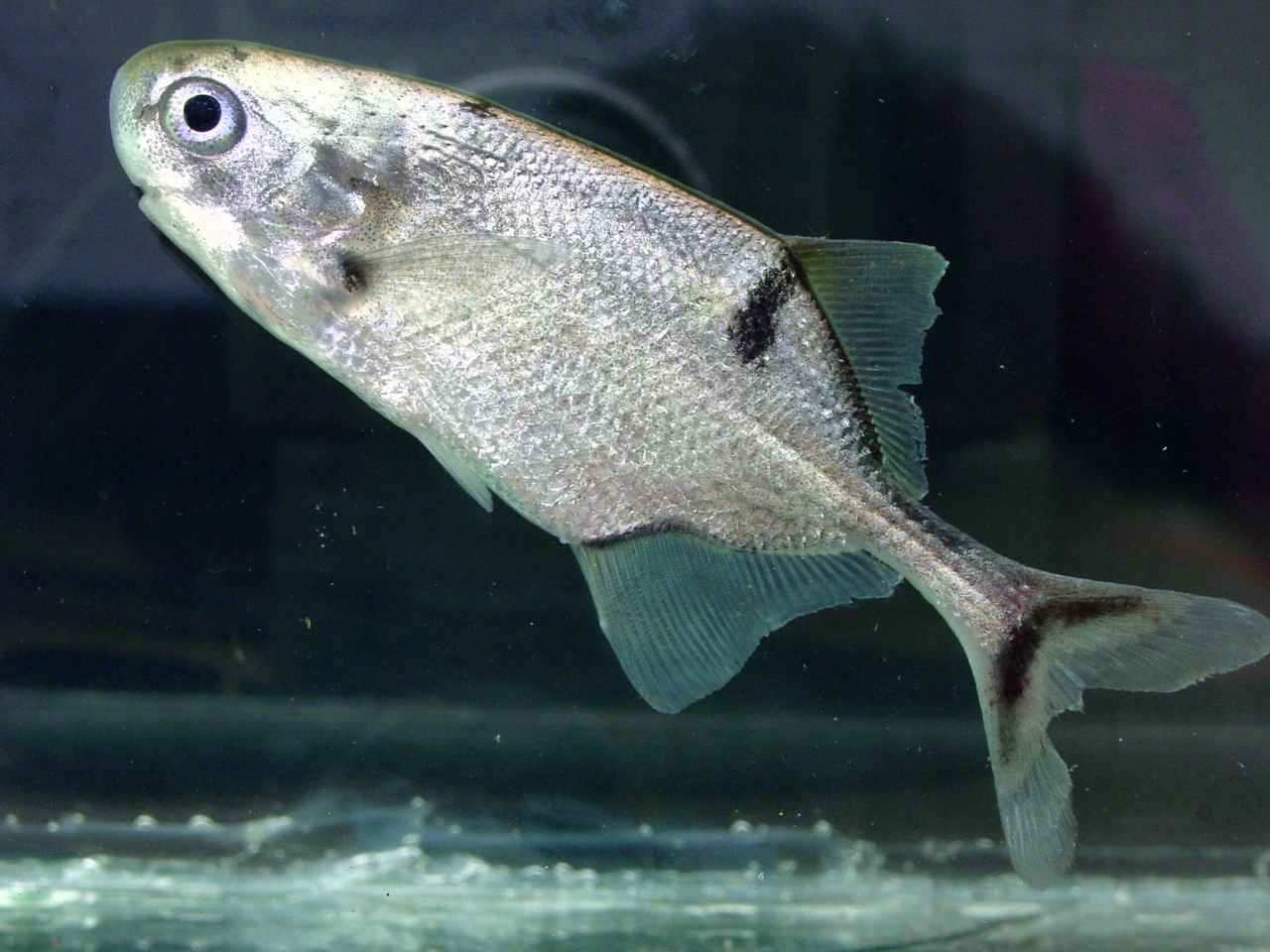

Scientific classification
- Kingdom: Animalia
- Phylum: Chordata
- Class: Actinopterygii
- Order: Osteoglossiformes
- Family: Mormyridae
- Genus: Petrocephalus
- Species: P. zakoni

Binomial name
- Petrocephalus zakoni Lavoué & Sullivan, & Arnegard, 2010

= Petrocephalus zakoni =

Species of fish

Petrocephalus zakoni is a species of weakly electric fish in the family Mormyridae, commonly known as elephantfishes. This species was described in 2010 by Lavoué, Sullivan, and Arnegard.

== Description ==
Petrocephalus zakoni is distinguished by its unique combination of morphological features. It has a dorsal fin with 23 or 24 branched rays and an anal fin with 27 or 28 branched rays1. The fish has a large eye, with the ratio of head length to eye diameter ranging between 3.1 and 3.3. The mouth is small, with the ratio of head length to mouth width between 4.4 and 5.01. It has 10 or fewer teeth in the upper jaw and 22 or fewer teeth in the lower jaw. The pigmentation pattern includes three well-defined black patches: one on each side of the body near the anterior base of the dorsal fin, one at the base of the pectoral fin, and one crescent-shaped mark at the base of the caudal fin.

== Size ==
This species reaches a length of 75.6 cm (29.8 in).

== Habitat ==
Petrocephalus zakoni is found in the Congo River basin, specifically in the Central African Republic, Republic of Congo, and Democratic Republic of the Congo. It inhabits freshwater environments and is benthopelagic, meaning it lives near the bottom of the water body.

== Etymology ==
The species was named in honor of Harold H. Zakon, of the University of Texas. He is a prominent researcher in neuroethology who has made significant contributions to the study of electrolocation and electrical communication in gymnotiform and mormyroid fishes.

== Aquarium care ==
While Petrocephalus zakoni is not commonly kept in aquariums, it would require similar care to other species in the Mormyridae family. This would include maintaining a tropical freshwater environment with appropriate water parameters, providing hiding spots and a substrate that mimics its natural habitat, and offering a varied diet.

== Conservation status ==
Petrocephalus zakoni has not been evaluated by the IUCN Red List, and there is no specific conservation status assigned to this species.
