= Petrocephalus pulsivertens =

Scientific classification
- Kingdom: Animalia
- Phylum: Chordata
- Class: Actinopterygii
- Order: Osteoglossiformes
- Family: Mormyridae
- Genus: Petrocephalus
- Species: P. pulsivertens

Binomial name
- Petrocephalus pulsivertens Lavoué & Sullivan, & Arnegard, 2010

Species of fish

Petrocephalus pulsivertens is a species of weakly electric fish in the family Mormyridae, commonly known as elephantfishes. This species was described in 2010 by Lavoué, Sullivan, and Arnegard.

== Description ==
Petrocephalus pulsivertens is distinguished by its unique combination of morphological features. It has a dorsal fin with at least 25 branched rays and an anal fin with at least 31 branched rays. The fish has a large eye, with the ratio of head length to eye diameter ranging between 3.2 and 3.51. The mouth is large, with the ratio of head length to mouth width between 2.0 and 3.7. Additionally, it has 15–21 teeth in the upper jaw and 24–30 teeth in the lower jaw. The pigmentation pattern includes two distinctive melanin markings: a distinct ovoid mark below the anterior base of the dorsal fin and a crescent-like mark at the base of the caudal fin.

== Size ==
This species reaches a length of 75.6 cm (29.8 in).

== Habitat ==
Petrocephalus pulsivertens is found in the Congo River basin, specifically in the middle Congo River basin in Cameroon, Central African Republic, and the Republic of Congo. It inhabits freshwater environments and is benthopelagic, meaning it lives near the bottom of the water body.

== Aquarium care ==
While Petrocephalus pulsivertens is not commonly kept in aquariums, it would require similar care to other species in the Mormyridae family. This would include maintaining a tropical freshwater environment with appropriate water parameters, providing hiding spots and a substrate that mimics its natural habitat, and offering a varied diet.

== Conservation status ==
Petrocephalus pulsivertens has not been evaluated by the IUCN Red List, and there is no specific conservation status assigned to this species.
