= Petrocephalus levequei =

Scientific classification
- Kingdom: Animalia
- Phylum: Chordata
- Class: Actinopterygii
- Order: Osteoglossiformes
- Family: Mormyridae
- Genus: Petrocephalus
- Species: P. levequei

Binomial name
- Petrocephalus levequei Bigorne & Paugy 1990

Species of fish

Petrocephalus levequei is a species of weakly electric fish in the family Mormyridae, commonly known as elephantfishes. This species was described in 1990 by Bigorne and Paugy.

== Description ==
Petrocephalus levequei is distinguished by its unique combination of morphological features. It has a dorsal fin with 27-32 branched rays and an anal fin with 32-37 branched rays. The fish has a large eye, with the ratio of head length to eye diameter ranging between 2.8 and 3.91. The mouth is large, with the ratio of head length to mouth width between 2.0 and 3.7. It has 15-21 teeth in the upper jaw and 24-30 teeth in the lower jaw. The pigmentation pattern includes two distinctive melanin markings: a distinct triangular spot below the anterior base of the dorsal fin, and a V-shaped spot at the base of the caudal fin.

== Size ==
This species reaches a length of 13.0 cm (5.1 in).

== Habitat ==
Petrocephalus levequei is found in the Atlantic Guinean slope, and it may possibly occur in coastal basins of Liberia. It inhabits freshwater environments and is benthopelagic, meaning it lives near the bottom of the water body.

== Discovery ==
The species was named in honor of French ichthyologist-hydrobiologist Christian Lévêque, ORSTOM (Office de la Recherche Scientifique et Technique d'Outre-Mer), who initiated a research program on the freshwater fishes of west Africa.

== Aquarium care ==
While Petrocephalus levequei is not commonly kept in aquariums, it would require similar care to other species in the Mormyridae family. This would include maintaining a tropical freshwater environment with appropriate water parameters, providing hiding spots and a substrate that mimics its natural habitat, and offering a varied diet.

== Conservation status ==
Petrocephalus levequei has been evaluated by the IUCN Red List and is listed as Least Concern (LC). This means that the species is currently not at risk of extinction in the wild.
