= Petrocephalus frieli =

Scientific classification
- Domain: Eukaryota
- Kingdom: Animalia
- Phylum: Chordata
- Class: Actinopterygii
- Order: Osteoglossiformes
- Family: Mormyridae
- Genus: Petrocephalus
- Species: P. frieli

Binomial name
- Petrocephalus frieli Lavoué 2012

Species of fish

Petrocephalus frieli is a species of weakly electric fish in the family Mormyridae, commonly known as elephantfishes. This species was described in 2012 by Lavoué.

== Description ==
Petrocephalus frieli is distinguished by its unique combination of morphological features. It has a dorsal fin with 21–24 branched rays and an anal fin with 28–30 branched rays. The fish has a large eye, with the ratio of head length to eye diameter ranging between 3.2 and 3.5. The mouth is large, with the ratio of head length to mouth width between 2.0 and 3.7. Additionally, it has 15–21 teeth in the upper jaw and 24–30 teeth in the lower jaw. The pigmentation pattern includes two distinctive melanin markings: a distinct ovoid mark below the anterior base of the dorsal fin and a crescent-like mark at the base of the caudal fin.

== Size ==
This species reaches a length of 75.6 cm (29.8 in).

== Habitat ==
Petrocephalus frieli is found in the Congo River basin, specifically in the upper Luapula and Chambezi River down to Lake Bangweulu in Zambia. It inhabits freshwater environments and is benthopelagic, meaning it lives near the bottom of the water body.

== Discovery ==
The species was named in honor of Dr. John P. Friel, a curator at the Cornell University Museum of Vertebrates, in recognition of his contributions to African ichthyology and his care of the large collection of African electric fish deposited at the museum. Dr. Friel was also one of the collectors of this new species.

== Aquarium care ==
While Petrocephalus frieli is not commonly kept in aquariums, it would require similar care to other species in the Mormyridae family. This would include maintaining a tropical freshwater environment with appropriate water parameters, providing hiding spots and a substrate that mimics its natural habitat, and offering a varied diet.

== Conservation status ==
Petrocephalus frieli has not been evaluated by the IUCN Red List, and there is no specific conservation status assigned to this species.
