= Petrocephalus soudanensis =

Scientific classification
- Kingdom: Animalia
- Phylum: Chordata
- Class: Actinopterygii
- Order: Osteoglossiformes
- Family: Mormyridae
- Genus: Petrocephalus
- Species: P. soudanensis

Binomial name
- Petrocephalus soudanensis Bigorne & Paugy 1990

Species of fish

Petrocephalus soudanensis is a species of weakly electric fish in the family Mormyridae, commonly known as elephantfishes. This species was described in 1990 by Bigorne and Paugy.

== Description ==
Petrocephalus soudanensis is distinguished by its unique combination of morphological features. It has a dorsal fin with 29-34 branched rays and an anal fin with 35-39 branched rays. The fish has a large eye, with the ratio of head length to eye diameter ranging between 3.0 and 3.7. The mouth is large, with the ratio of head length to mouth width between 2.0 and 3.7. Additionally, it has 15-21 teeth in the upper jaw and 24-30 teeth in the lower jaw. The pigmentation pattern includes two distinctive melanin markings: a distinct triangular spot below the anterior base of the dorsal fin and a V-shaped spot at the base of the caudal fin.

== Size ==
This species reaches a length of 10.8 cm (4.3 in).

== Habitat ==
Petrocephalus levequei is found in the Congo River basin, specifically in the upper and lower Niger, upper reaches of the Benue, coastal Nigerian basins, the Volta, and Chad basins. It inhabits freshwater environments and is benthopelagic, meaning it lives near the bottom of the water body.

== Discovery ==
The species was named after the Sudan region, where it was first discovered. The name "soudanensis" reflects its association with this region.

== Aquarium care ==
While Petrocephalus soudanensis is not commonly kept in aquariums, it would require similar care to other species in the Mormyridae family. This would include maintaining a tropical freshwater environment with appropriate water parameters, providing hiding spots and a substrate that mimics its natural habitat, and offering a varied diet.

== Conservation status ==
Petrocephalus soudanensis has been evaluated by the IUCN Red List and is listed as Least Concern (LC). This means that the species is currently not at risk of extinction in the wild.
