= Petrocephalus wesselsi =

Scientific classification
- Kingdom: Animalia
- Phylum: Chordata
- Class: Actinopterygii
- Order: Osteoglossiformes
- Family: Mormyridae
- Genus: Petrocephalus
- Species: P. wesselsi

Binomial name
- Petrocephalus wesselsi B. J. Kramer & van der Bank, 2000

Species of fish

Petrocephalus wesselsi, commonly known as the Southern Churchill, is a species of weakly electric fish in the family Mormyridae, commonly known as elephantfishes. This species was described in 2000 by Kramer and van der Bank.

== Description ==
Petrocephalus wesselsi is distinguished by its unique combination of morphological features. It has a dorsal fin with 18-21 branched rays and an anal fin with 25-28 branched rays. The fish has a large eye, with the ratio of head length to eye diameter ranging between 3.0 and 3.71. The mouth is large, with the ratio of head length to mouth width between 2.0 and 3.7. Additionally, it has 15-21 teeth in the upper jaw and 24-30 teeth in the lower jaw. The pigmentation pattern includes two distinctive melanin markings: a distinct triangular spot below the anterior base of the dorsal fin and a V-shaped spot at the base of the caudal fin.

== Size ==
This species reaches a length of 5.1 cm (2.0 in).

== Habitat ==
Petrocephalus wesselsi is found in the southern African region, specifically in the Incomati River system, including the Sabie River, the Blyde and Letaba rivers that drain into the Limpopo River system, and the Pongola River in Natal. It inhabits freshwater environments and is benthopelagic, meaning it lives near the bottom of the water body.

== Etymology ==
The species was named in honor of Pierre Wessels of Johannesburg, South Africa, who was a participant in the authors' expeditions to Caprivi, Namibia.

== Aquarium care ==
While Petrocephalus wesselsi is not commonly kept in aquariums, it would require similar care to other species in the Mormyridae family. This would include maintaining a tropical freshwater environment with appropriate water parameters, providing hiding spots and a substrate that mimics its natural habitat, and offering a varied diet.

== Conservation status ==
Petrocephalus wesselsi has been evaluated by the IUCN Red List and is listed as Least Concern (LC). This means that the species is currently not at risk of extinction in the wild.
