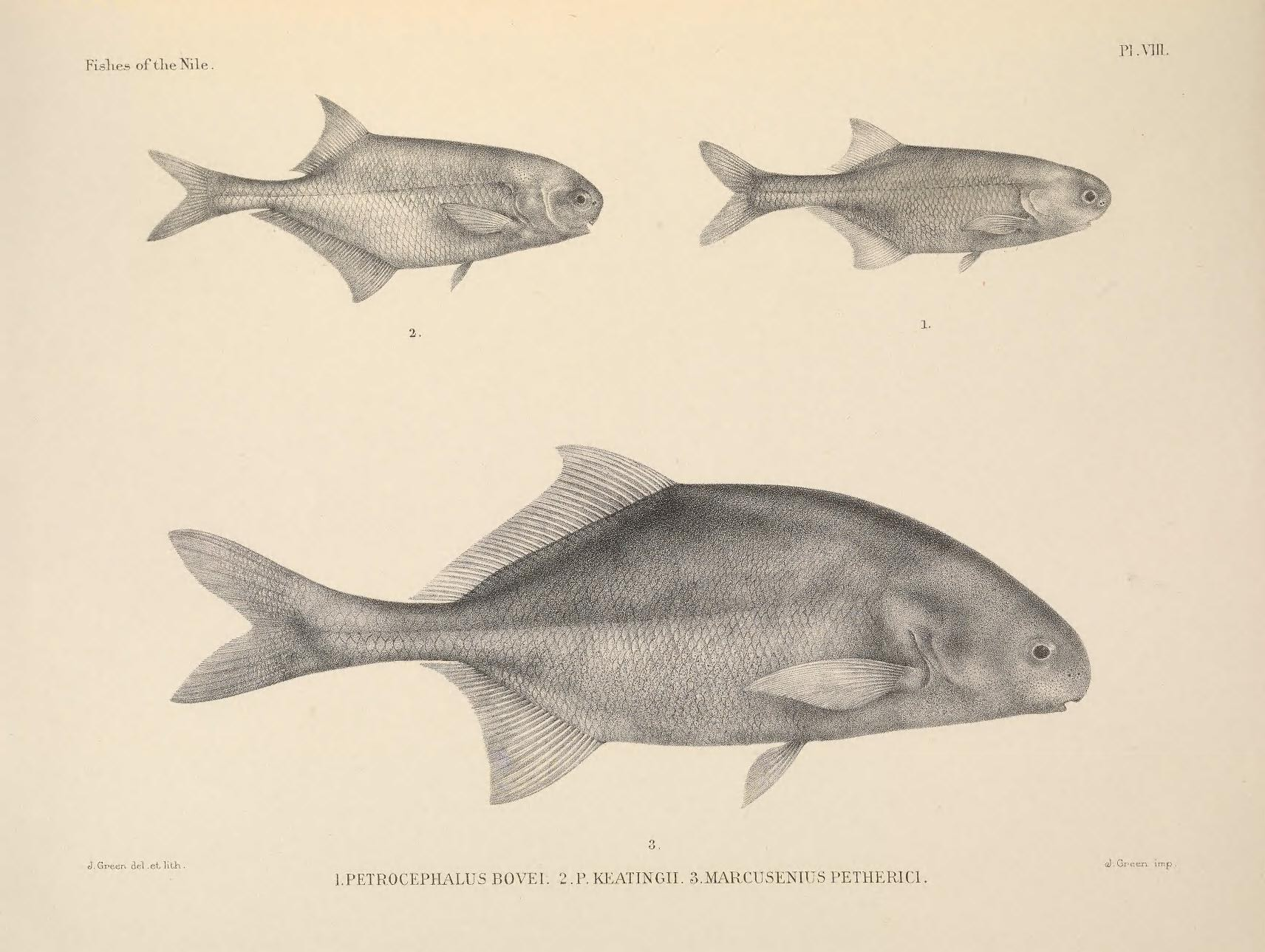
- Two species of Petrocephalus (above)

Scientific classification
- Kingdom: Animalia
- Phylum: Chordata
- Class: Actinopterygii
- Division: Teleostei
- Order: Osteoglossiformes
- Family: Mormyridae
- Genus: Petrocephalus; Marcusen, 1854

Type species
- Mormyrus bane Lacépède, 1803

= Petrocephalus =

Genus of ray-finned fishes

Petrocephalus is a genus of ray-finned fish in the family Mormyridae. All the fish species of this genus are endemic to Africa.

== Species ==
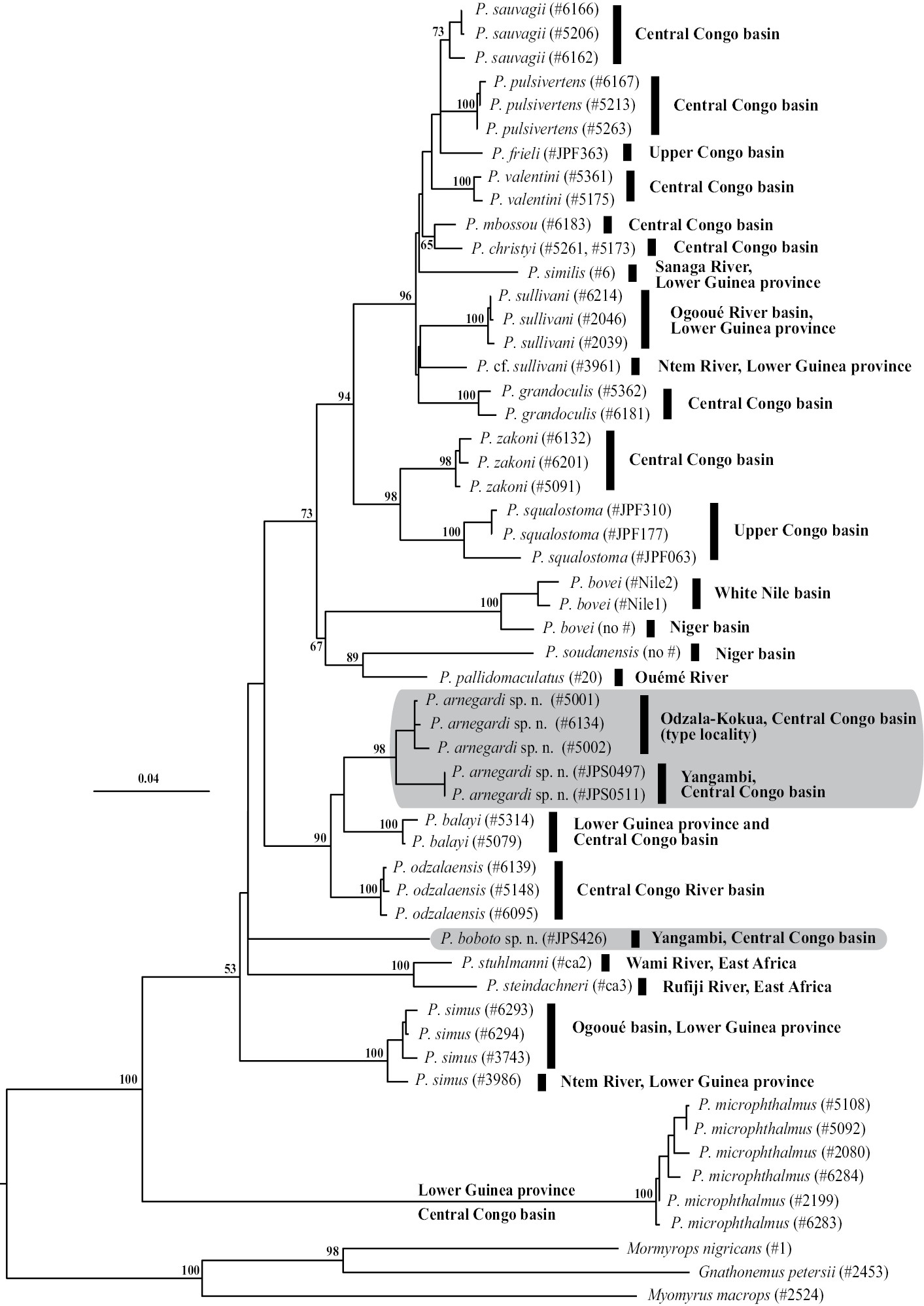
Cladistics of Petrocephalus

There are currently 48 recognized species in this genus:

- Petrocephalus ansorgii Boulenger, 1903
- Petrocephalus arnegardi Lavoué & Sullivan, 2014
- Petrocephalus balayi Sauvage, 1883
- Petrocephalus balteatus Rochebrune, 1885
- Petrocephalus bane (Lacépède, 1803)
- Petrocephalus binotatus Pellegrin, 1924
- Petrocephalus boboto [Lavoué & Sullivan, 2014
- Petrocephalus bovei (Valenciennes, 1847)
- Petrocephalus catostoma (Günther, 1866)
- Petrocephalus christyi Boulenger, 1920
- Petrocephalus congicus L. R. David & Poll, 1937
- Petrocephalus cunganus Boulenger, 1910
- Petrocephalus degeni Boulenger, 1906
- Petrocephalus frieli Lavoué, 2012
- Petrocephalus gliroides (Vinciguerra 1897)
- Petrocephalus grandoculis [Boulenger, 1920
- Petrocephalus guttatus Fowler, 1936
- Petrocephalus haullevillii Boulenger, 1912
- Petrocephalus hutereaui ([Boulenger,] 1913)
- Petrocephalus keatingii Boulenger, 1901
- Petrocephalus leo Lavoué, 2016
- Petrocephalus levequei Bigorne & Paugy 1990
- Petrocephalus longianalis B. J. Kramer I. R. Bills, P. H. Skelton & Wink 2012
- Petrocephalus longicapitis B. J. Kramer, I. R. Bills, P. H. Skelton & Wink, 2012
- Petrocephalus magnitrunci B. J. Kramer, I. R. Bills, P. H. Skelton & Wink, 2012
- Petrocephalus magnoculis B. J. Kramer, I. R. Bills, P. H. Skelton & Wink, 2012
- Petrocephalus mbossou Lavoué, Sullivan & Arnegard, 2010
- Petrocephalus microphthalmus Pellegrin, 1909
- Petrocephalus odzalaensis Lavoué, Sullivan & Arnegard, 2010
- Petrocephalus okavangensis B. J. Kramer, I. R. Bills, P. H. Skelton & Wink 2012
- Petrocephalus pallidomaculatus Bigorne & Paugy, 1990
- Petrocephalus pellegrini Poll, 1941
- Petrocephalus petersi B. J. Kramer, I. R. Bills, P. H. Skelton & Wink, 2012
- Petrocephalus pulsivertens Lavoué, Sullivan & Arnegard, 2010
- Petrocephalus sauvagii (Boulenger, 1887)
- Petrocephalus schoutedeni Poll, 1954
- Petrocephalus similis Lavoué, 2011
- Petrocephalus simus Sauvage, 1879
- Petrocephalus soudanensis Bigorne & Paugy, 1990
- Petrocephalus squalostoma (Boulenger, 1915)
- Petrocephalus steindachneri Fowler, 1958
- Petrocephalus stuhlmanni Boulenger, 1909
- Petrocephalus sullivani Lavoué, C. D. Hopkins & Kamdem Toham 2004
- Petrocephalus tanensis Whitehead & Greenwood 1959
- Petrocephalus tenuicauda (Steindachner 1894)
- Petrocephalus valentini Lavoué, Sullivan & Arnegard, 2010
- Petrocephalus wesselsi B. J. Kramer & van der Bank, 2000
- Petrocephalus zakoni [Lavoué, Sullivan & Arnegard, 2010
Specimens of Petrocephalus

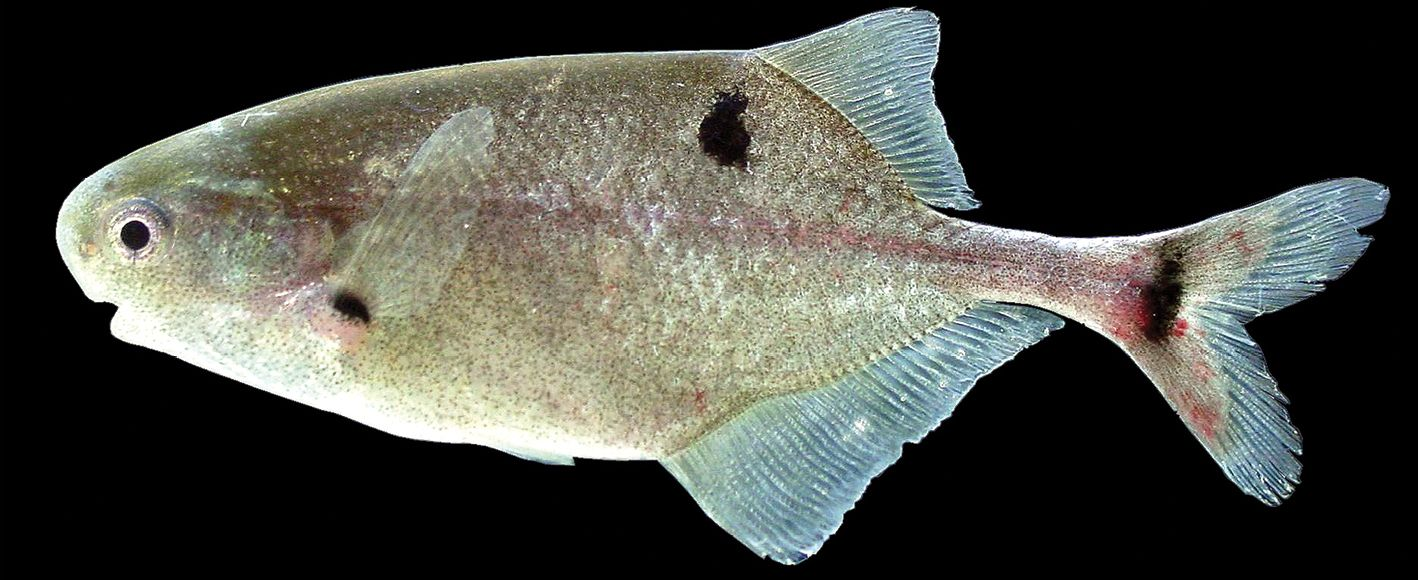
P. arnegardi

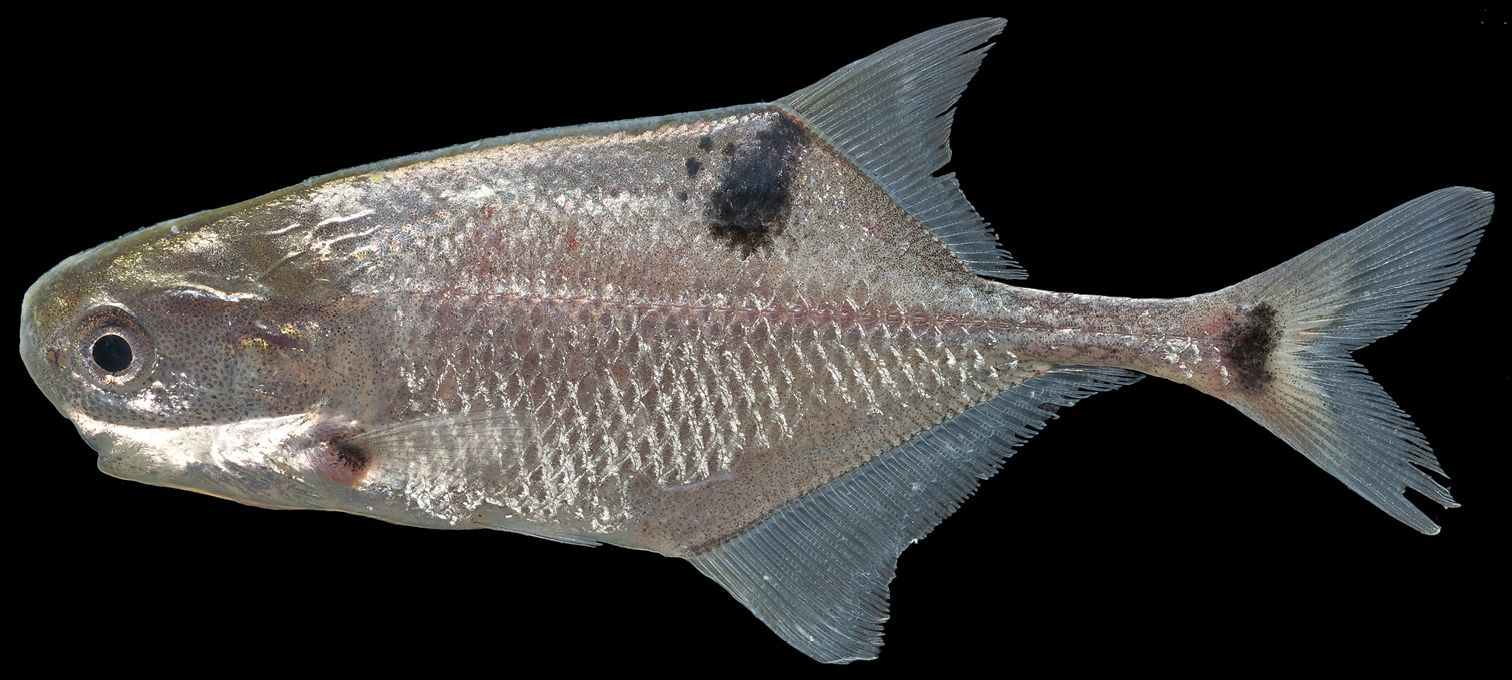
P. boboto

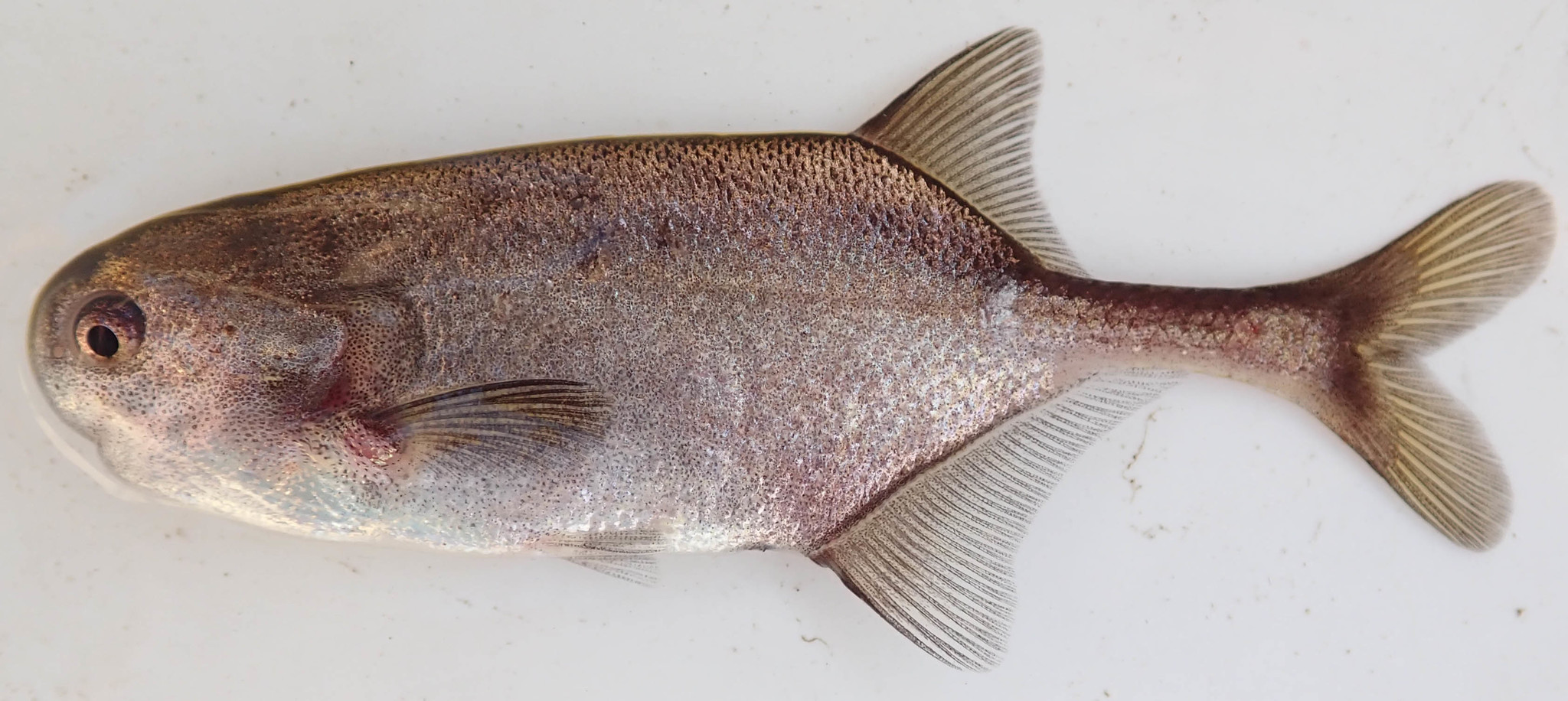
P. okavangensis

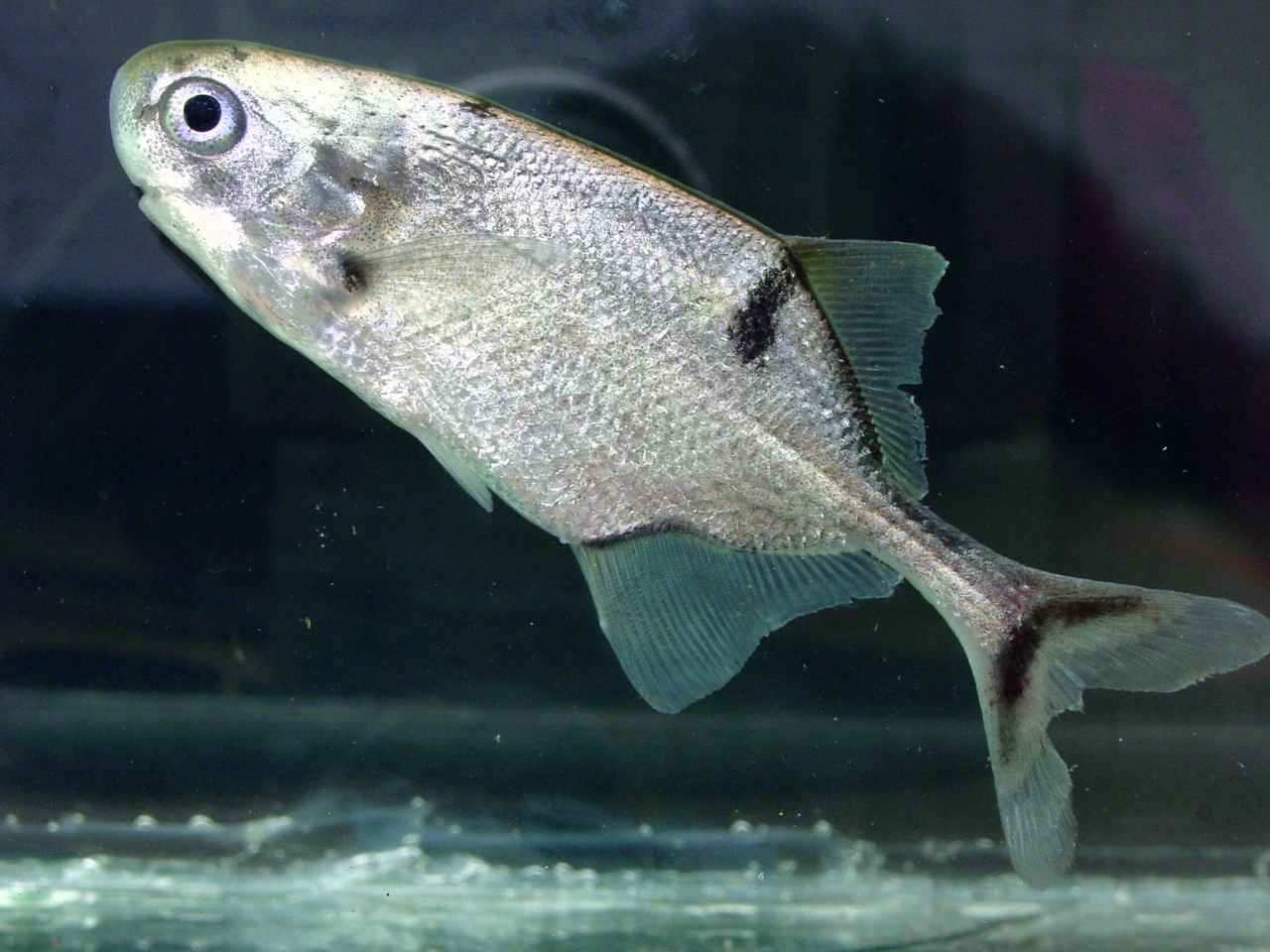
P. zakoni
