= Odzala-Kokoua National Park =

- IUCN category II (national park)
- Location within Republic of the Congo
- Location: Cuvette-Ouest Department, Republic of the Congo
- Nearest city: Ewo
- Coordinates: 0.8°N 14.9°E
- Area: 13,500 km^{2} (5,200 sq mi)
- Established: 1935

UNESCO World Heritage Site
- Criteria: Natural: ix, x
- Reference: 692
- Inscription: 2023 (45th Session)

Odzala-Kokoua National Park (or Odzala National Park) is a national park in the Republic of the Congo. The park was first protected in 1935, declared a biosphere reserve in 1977, and granted official designation by presidential decree in 2001. Odzala-Kokoua has approximately 100 mammal species, and one of the continent's most diverse primate populations. The nonprofit conservation organization African Parks began managing the park in collaboration with the Ministry of Forest Economy, Sustainable Development and Environment of the Republic of the Congo in 2010.

== Description ==
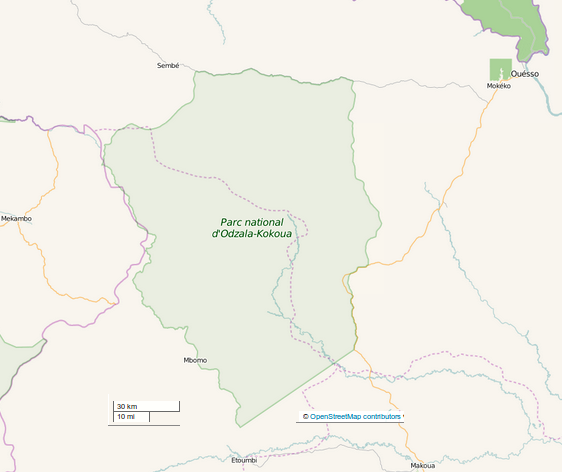
Map displaying the park's boundaries

Odzala-Kokoua is an approximately 13,500-square-kilometre (5,200 sq mi) national park and biosphere reserve in northwestern Republic of the Congo, established in 1935. The park has preserved old-growth rainforest and variable terrain, ranging from 350-metre (1,150 ft) tall hills to dense jungle and numerous glades. Odzala-Kokoua has dry forest, savanna, and rainforest ecosystems. The park is managed by African Parks in partnership with the Congolese government.

== History and tourism ==
Odzala-Kokoua is one of Africa's oldest national parks, first protected in 1935 and given official designation by presidential decree from Denis Sassou Nguesso in 2001. The park was designated a biosphere reserve in 1977, and has been administered since 1992 with financial assistance from Conservation and Rational Utilization of Forest Ecosystems in Central Africa (ECOFAC), a European Union-sponsored program that establishes a framework for conserving rainforests in the region. Conservation efforts were limited during the Republic of the Congo Civil War (1997–99). Odzala-Kokoua was neglected for years around the time of the Ebola outbreaks and suffered from heavy poaching. Tourism was limited until recently, with only 50 tourists visiting Odzala-Kokoua in 2011.

African Parks began managing the park in 2010, as part of a 25-year agreement with the Ministry of Forest and Sustainable Development of the Republic of the Congo. In 2013, African Parks, the United States Fish and Wildlife Service, Wildlife Conservation Society (WCS), and the World Wide Fund for Nature entered into a five-year, $10 million agreement to collaborate and work to conserve Odzala-Kokoua and the Sangha Trinational. WCS has been supporting the government's management and preservation of Odzala-Kokoua and other national parks since the early 1990s. African Parks initiated Congo's first firearm amnesty program in 2013, offering poachers positions as park rangers in exchange for weapons and intelligence.

According to CNN, 76 guards were patrolling Odzala-Kokoua in early 2014. Two Malinois dogs were trained to detect ivory and animal meat in 2014, in an effort to reduce poaching. Despite having national park status, which protects against mining, Mongabay reported in 2016 that some mining permits issued by the government allowed mineral extraction in parts of Odzala-Kokoua.

Odzala-Kokoua opened for tourist visits in August 2012. Wilderness Safaris invested in the park by improving infrastructure, constructing two luxury lodges, and providing additional training to guides and rangers. The lodges took six years to become fully operational, and received funding from philanthropist Sabine Plattner, the wife of German businessman Hasso Plattner. The company's operating contract ended in 2015, and the camps have since been run directly by the Congo Conservation Company, which Sabine Plattner established and funds.

In 2023, the Forest Massif of Odzala-Kokoua, which includes the national park, was inscribed on the UNESCO World Heritage List for its exceptional biodiversity and importance as a habitat for forest elephants.

In 2025, the park administration acknowledged that its guards had committed human rights abuses that included torture, rape and forced displacement against indigenous peoples who were displaced during the park's construction following an internal investigation by the wildlife parks consortium African Parks.

== Flora and fauna ==
Odzala-Kokoua hosts approximately 4,500 plant and tree species. The vast majority of the park's forest is open-canopy Marantaceae.

=== Mammals ===
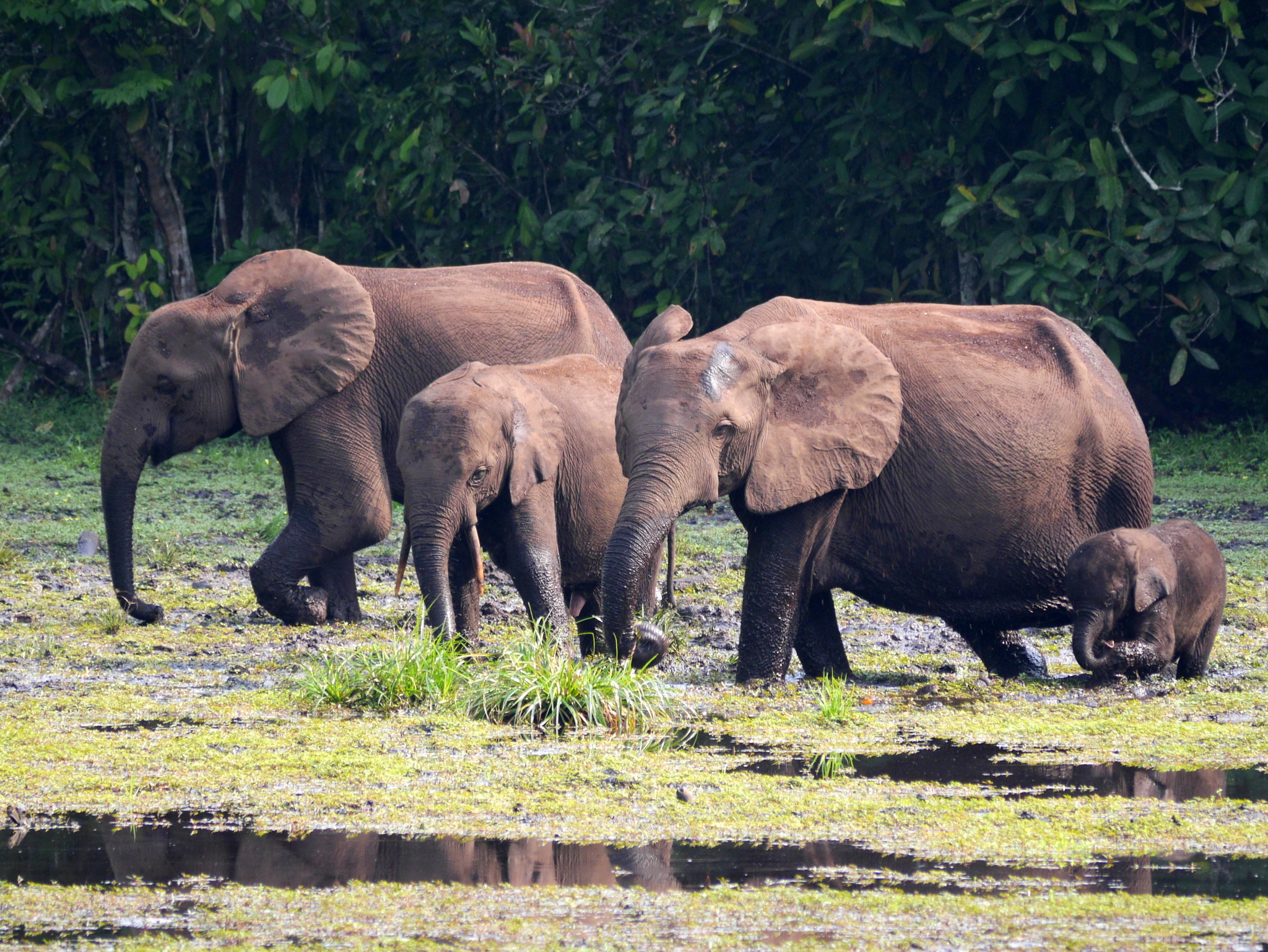
A group of four African forest elephants in the National Park

The park has approximately 100 mammal species, and one of the continent's most diverse primate populations. Odzala-Kokoua was once home to nearly 20,000 gorillas. However, during 2002–2005, a series of Ebola virus disease outbreaks killed 70–95% of the park's population. In 2005, Ebola killed approximately 5,000 gorillas within a 1,042 sq mi (2,700 km^{2}) area of the park, according to the United States Fish and Wildlife Service. The number of gorillas in Odzala-Kokoua has since increased, following efforts by conservation organizations and at least one tourism company to preserve and rehabilitate the park.

A survey of diurnal primates, conducted during the mid-1990s, showed significant monkey populations in the Republic of the Congo's forest region. Sighted species included the western lowland gorilla and central chimpanzee, as well as eight monkeys: Angolan talapoin, black crested mangabey, crested mona monkey, De Brazza's monkey, greater spot-nosed monkey, mantled guereza, moustached guenon, and Tana River mangabey. The number of gorilla nests was highest in the park's open-canopy Marantaceae forest; chimpanzee nests were most abundant in closed-canopy primary and Marantaceae forests. All monkey species were found in the forest's densest areas, but only four were present in the terra firma forest. Odzala-Kokoua had the highest densities of western lowland gorilla and chimpanzee in Central Africa recorded to date. High forest productivity and decreased poaching are thought to have contributed to this success.

The results of a survey conducted in clearings within the northern part of the park, published in 1998, showed the presence of 13 large mammals, the most frequent of which were the bongo, buffalo, African elephant, forest hog, giant forest hog, gorilla, and sitatunga. Other mammal species recorded include the African civet, African forest elephant, black-and-white colobus, and common chimpanzee. Poaching has been attributed to the park's elephant population decline. Surveys of Odzala-Kokoua's African forest elephant population resulted in estimates of approximately 18,200 and 13,500 in 2000 and 2005, respectively. There were approximately 9,600 elephants as of 2014.

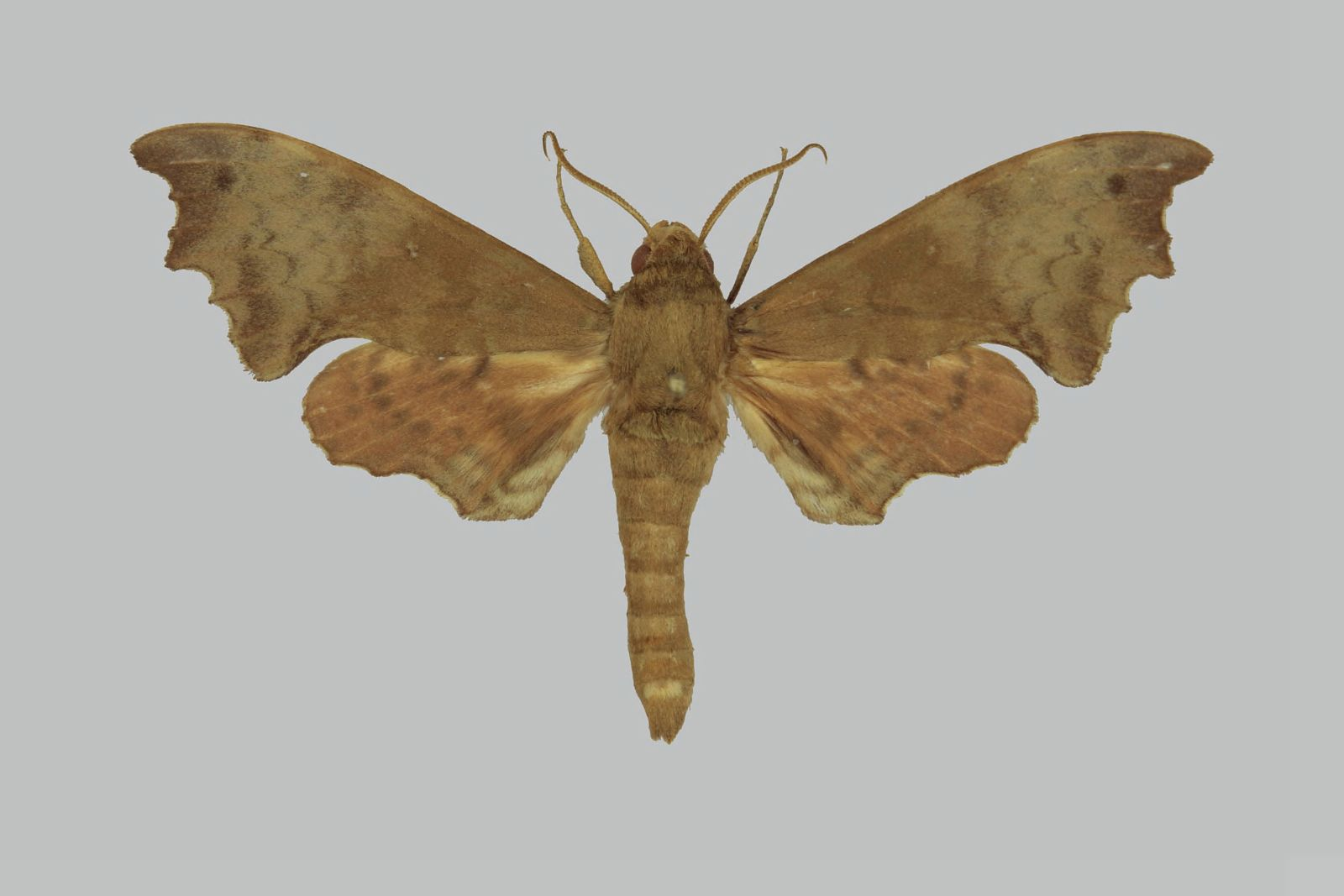
Male specimen of the moth species Grillotius bergeri, from the park

Spotted hyenas were reportedly abundant in the park's savanna area in 2007. In 2013, the lion was considered locally extinct, as the species had not been recorded for fifteen years. Survey results published in 2014 revealed the absence of lions, but at least 46 hyenas were recorded in the park's savanna ecosystem. Also, the African golden cat, leopard, and serval were recorded. The decline of lion and spotted hyena populations is thought to be caused by overexploitation. Antelope species include the bay duiker, black-fronted duiker, Peters' duiker, and white-bellied duiker.

Several authors noted the importance of forest clearings for the park's mammal populations.

=== Birds ===
Approximately 440 bird species have been recorded in the park. Species include the African fish eagle, black-backed cisticola, black-throated apalis, black-winged pratincole, eastern wattled cuckooshrike, forest robin, forest wood hoopoe, great snipe, green pigeon, grey parrot, grey-headed broadbill, lesser kestrel, Pel's fishing owl, pied kingfisher, red-capped crombec, red-throated cliff swallow, Uganda woodland warbler, and yellow-capped weaver. Herons, hornbills, and kingfishers are also present, including the goliath heron, black dwarf hornbill, and giant kingfisher. The park has been designated an Important Bird Area (IBA) by BirdLife International because it supports significant populations of many bird species.

=== Reptiles, amphibians, fish, and insects ===
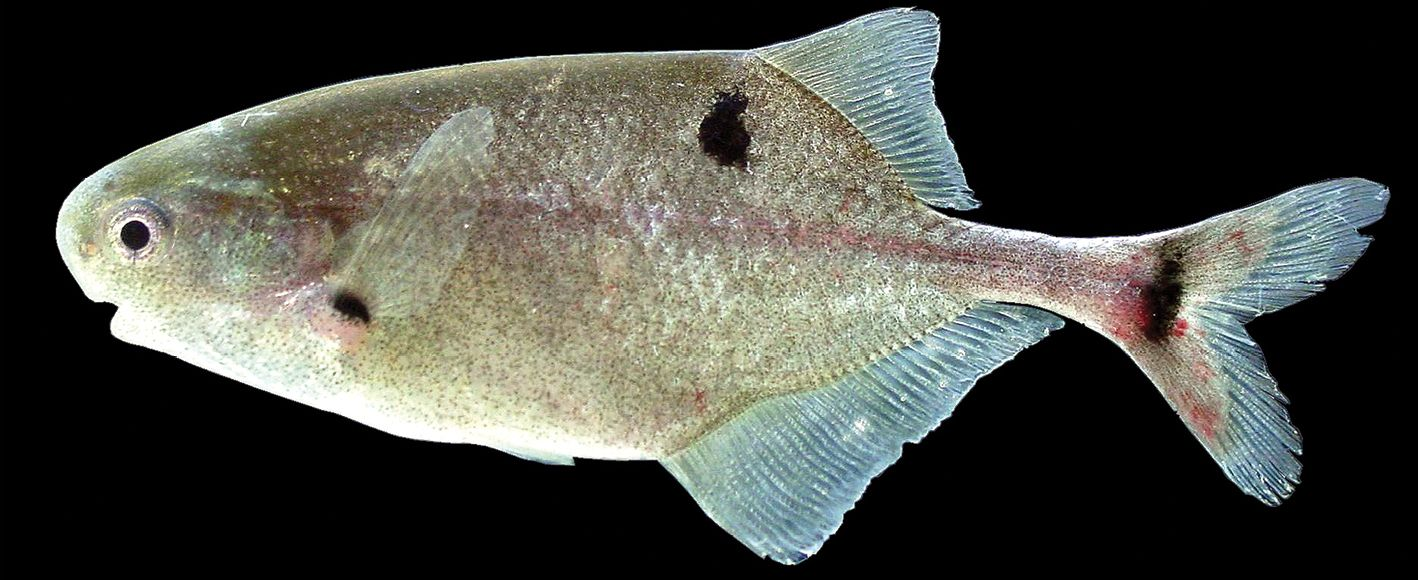
Paratype of Petrocephalus arnegardi from Odzala-Kokua National Park, 2014

Crocodiles, lizards, and frogs live in Odzala-Kokoua. A study published in Zootaxa in 2010 reported the presence of 11 species of Petrocephalus. The distichodontid fish species Hemigrammocharax rubensteini, described in 2013, has been recorded in the park. Odzala-Kokoua hosts a variety of insect species, including ants, bees, butterflies, and termites.

== See also ==
- Geography of the Republic of the Congo
- List of national parks in Africa
- World Network of Biosphere Reserves in Africa
- Congo Tales – a photo series book of Congolese from the Mbomo District acting out their mythologies in the Odzala-Kokoua National Park
