= Wilhelm Peters =

German naturalist and explorer (1815–1883)

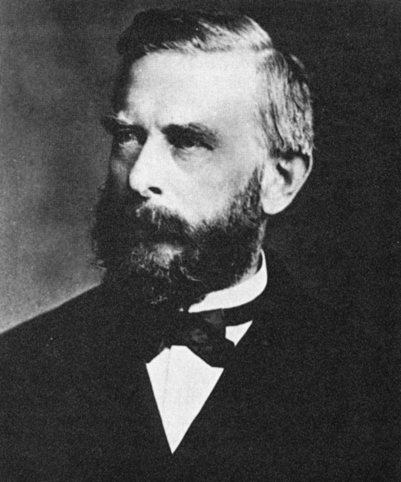
- Born: 22 April 1815; Koldenbüttel, Duchy of Schleswig
- Died: 20 April 1883 (aged 67); Berlin, Germany
- Scientific career
- Fields: Explorer, zoologist
- Author abbrev. (zoology): Peters

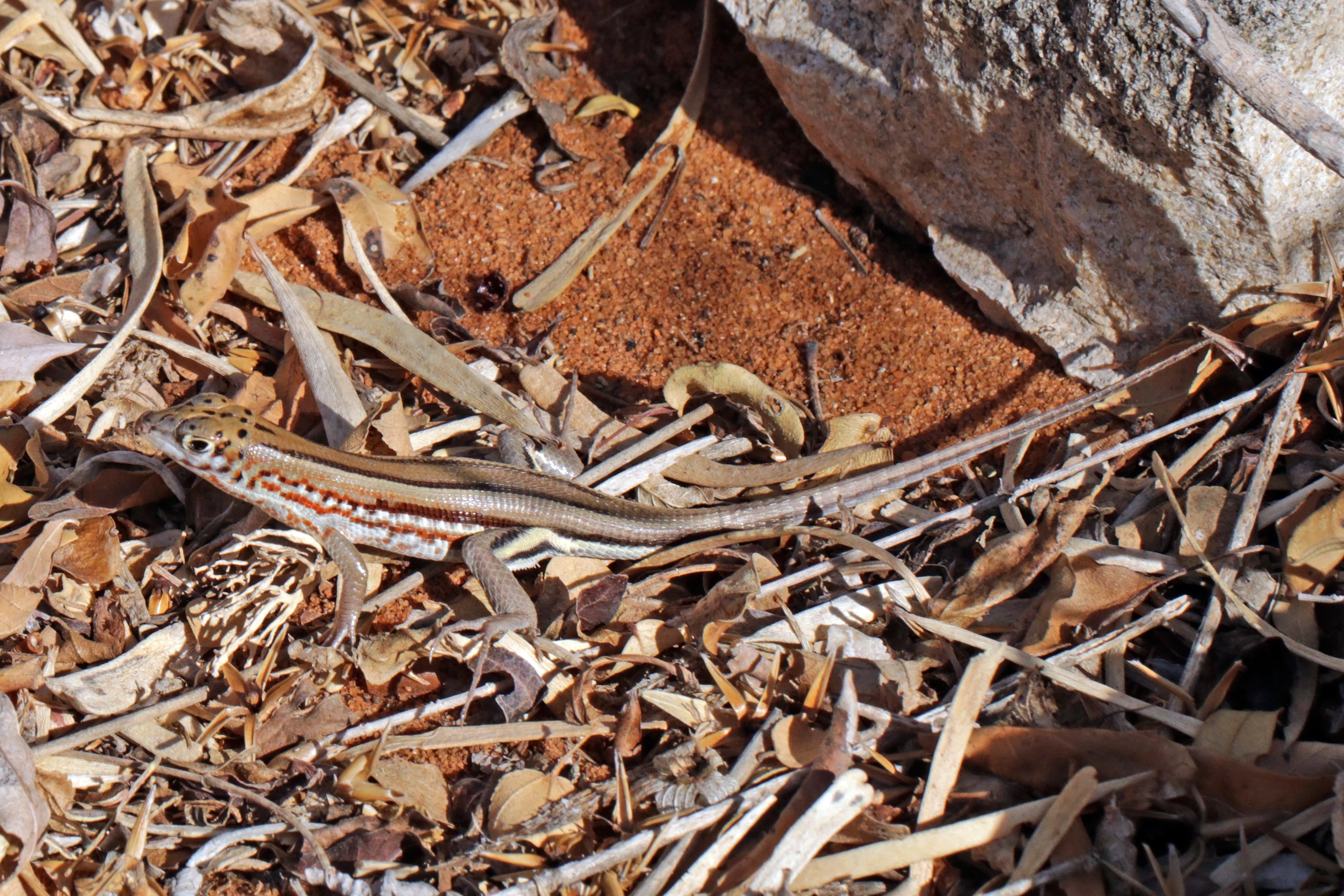
Peters' keeled plated lizard (Tracheloptychus petersi)

Wilhelm Karl Hartwich (or Hartwig) Peters (22 April 1815 – 20 April 1883) was a German naturalist and explorer.

He was assistant to the anatomist Johannes Peter Müller and later became curator of the Berlin Zoological Museum. Encouraged by Müller and the explorer Alexander von Humboldt, Peters travelled to Mozambique via Angola in September 1842, exploring the coastal region and the Zambesi River. He returned to Berlin with an enormous collection of natural history specimens, which he then described in Naturwissenschaftliche Reise nach Mossambique... in den Jahren 1842 bis 1848 ausgeführt (1852–1882). The work was comprehensive in its coverage, dealing with mammals, birds, reptiles, amphibians, river fish, insects and botany. He replaced Martin Lichtenstein as curator of the museum in 1858, and in the same year he was elected a foreign member of the Royal Swedish Academy of Sciences. In a few years, he greatly increased the Berlin Museum's herpetological collection to a size comparable to those of Paris and London. Herpetology was Peters' main interest, and he described 122 new genera and 649 species from around the world. Peters also described at least one new fish species, the piranha Serrasalmus irritans, Peters 1877, based on a specimen reported as from San Fernando de Apure, Venezuela.

== Eponyms ==
Wilhelm Peters is commemorated in the scientific names of several species:

Mammals, including

- Rhynchocyon petersi

Reptiles, including

- Andinosaura petrorum,
- Anolis petersii,
- Geophis petersii,
- Hebius petersii,
- Morenia petersi, and
- Tracheloptychus petersi.

Fish

- An African freshwater elephantfish, Gnathonemus petersii, known commonly as Peters's elephantnose fish.
- The African Fish Distichodus petersii Pfeffer, 1896
- Petrocephalus petersi, is a species of electric fish in the family Mormyridae, it is found in the Zambezi River Delta and the Melela River.

Plants

- Nymphaea nouchali var. petersiana

Geographic

- Peters Bay in NE Greenland was named after him by Carl Koldewey during the 1869–1870 Second German North Polar Expedition.

== Author abbreviation ==
Sometimes, W. Peters is used to prevent confusion with herpetologists Günther Peters and James A. Peters.

== Family ==
His older brother was the German-born American Astronomer Christian Heinrich Friedrich Peters.

== Works ==
- Naturwissenschaftliche Reise nach Mossambique. Band 1: Zoologie / Säugethiere . Reimer, Berlin 1852 Digital edition by the University and State Library Düsseldorf
- Naturwissenschaftliche Reise nach Mossambique. Band 2: Zoologie / Vögel . Reimer, Berlin [1883] Digital edition by the University and State Library Düsseldorf
- Naturwissenschaftliche Reise nach Mossambique. Band 3: Zoologie / Amphibien . Reimer, Berlin 1882 Digital edition by the University and State Library Düsseldorf
- Naturwissenschaftliche Reise nach Mossambique. Band 4: Zoologie / Flußfische . Reimer, Berlin 1868 Digital edition by the University and State Library Düsseldorf
- Naturwissenschaftliche Reise nach Mossambique. Band 5: Zoologie / Insecten und Myriopoden . Reimer, Berlin 1862 Digital edition by the University and State Library Düsseldorf
- Naturwissenschaftliche Reise nach Mossambique. Botanik Abth. 1 . Reimer, Berlin 1862 Digital edition by the University and State Library Düsseldorf
- Naturwissenschaftliche Reise nach Mossambique. Botanik Abth. 2 . Reimer, Berlin 1864 Digital edition by the University and State Library Düsseldorf

== See also ==
- Category:Taxa named by Wilhelm Peters
