= Henri Émile Sauvage =

French paleontologist, ichthyologist, and herpetologist

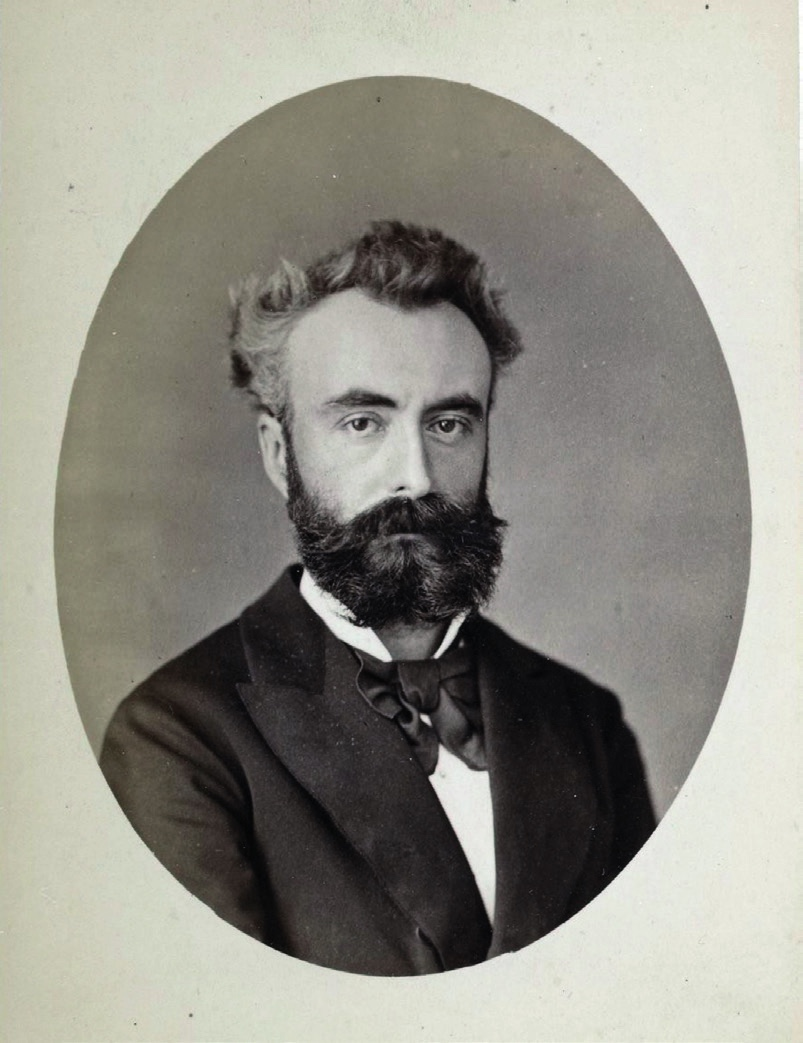
- Born: 22 September 1842; Boulogne-sur-Mer, Pas-de-Calais, France
- Died: 3 January 1917 (aged 74); Boulogne-sur-Mer, Pas-de-Calais, France
- Known for: Discovery of Mesozoic fish and reptiles
- Scientific career
- Fields: Paleontology, ichthyology, herpetology
- Institutions: Muséum d'Histoire Naturelle in Boulogne-sur-Mer

Henri Émile Sauvage (22 September 1842 in Boulogne-sur-Mer – 3 January 1917 in Boulogne-sur-Mer) was a French paleontologist, ichthyologist, and herpetologist. He was a leading expert on Mesozoic fish and reptiles.

He worked as a curator at the Muséum d'Histoire Naturelle in Boulogne-sur-Mer, and published extensively on Late Jurassic dinosaurs and other vertebrates from the Boulonnais region of northern France. He is mainly known for having first described in 1873 the famous pliosaurid Liopleurodon. He made important contributions involving vertebrate palaeontology in Portugal, describing in 1897, Suchosaurus girardi from jaw fragments found in that country.

From 1883 to 1896, he served as director of the station aquicole in Boulogne-sur-Mer. He was a member of the Société géologique de France. In 1893 Philippe Thomas published the palaeontological results of the Tunisian Scientific Exploration Mission (1885–1886) in six installments plus an atlas, including the work of Victor-Auguste Gauthier (sea urchins), Arnould Locard (Mollusca), Auguste Péron (Brachiopods, Bryozoa and Pentacrinitess) and Henri Émile Sauvage (fish).

The plesiosaurid species Lusonectes sauvagei commemorates his name, as do the crustacean species Pseudanthessius sauvagei and the gecko species Bavayia sauvagii.

== Works ==
- Note sur les geckotiens de la Nouvelle-Calédonie, 1878.
- Bassin houiller et permien d'Autun et d'Épinac, 1889–97 (with Frédéric Delafond, Michel Lévy, Bernard Renault, René Zeiller, 7 volumes).
- Histoire naturelle des poissons, (1891); in Alfred Grandidier's Histoire physique, naturelle et politique de Madagascar.
- Vertébrés fossiles du Portugal: Contributions à l'étude des poissons et des reptiles du jurassique et du crétacique, (1897).
- Musées municipaux de Boulogne-sur-Mer, 1898.
- "Amphibious Fishes" in Popular Science Monthly Volume 9, September 1876
- "The Archer-Fishes" in Popular Science Monthly Volume 12, January 1878
- "The Matamata" in Popular Science Monthly Volume 16, March 1880.
- Biography: La Vie et l'oeuvre d'Emile Sauvage; Author: Casimir Cépède. Publisher: Boulogne-sur-Mer :Imprimerie G. Hamain, 1923.

== Taxon described by him ==
- See Category:Taxa named by Henri Émile Sauvage

== Taxon named in his honor ==
- The Sauvage's mormyrid, Petrocephalus sauvagii, is a species of electric fish in the family Mormyridae, found in the Congo River basin and Niger Delta in Africa.
