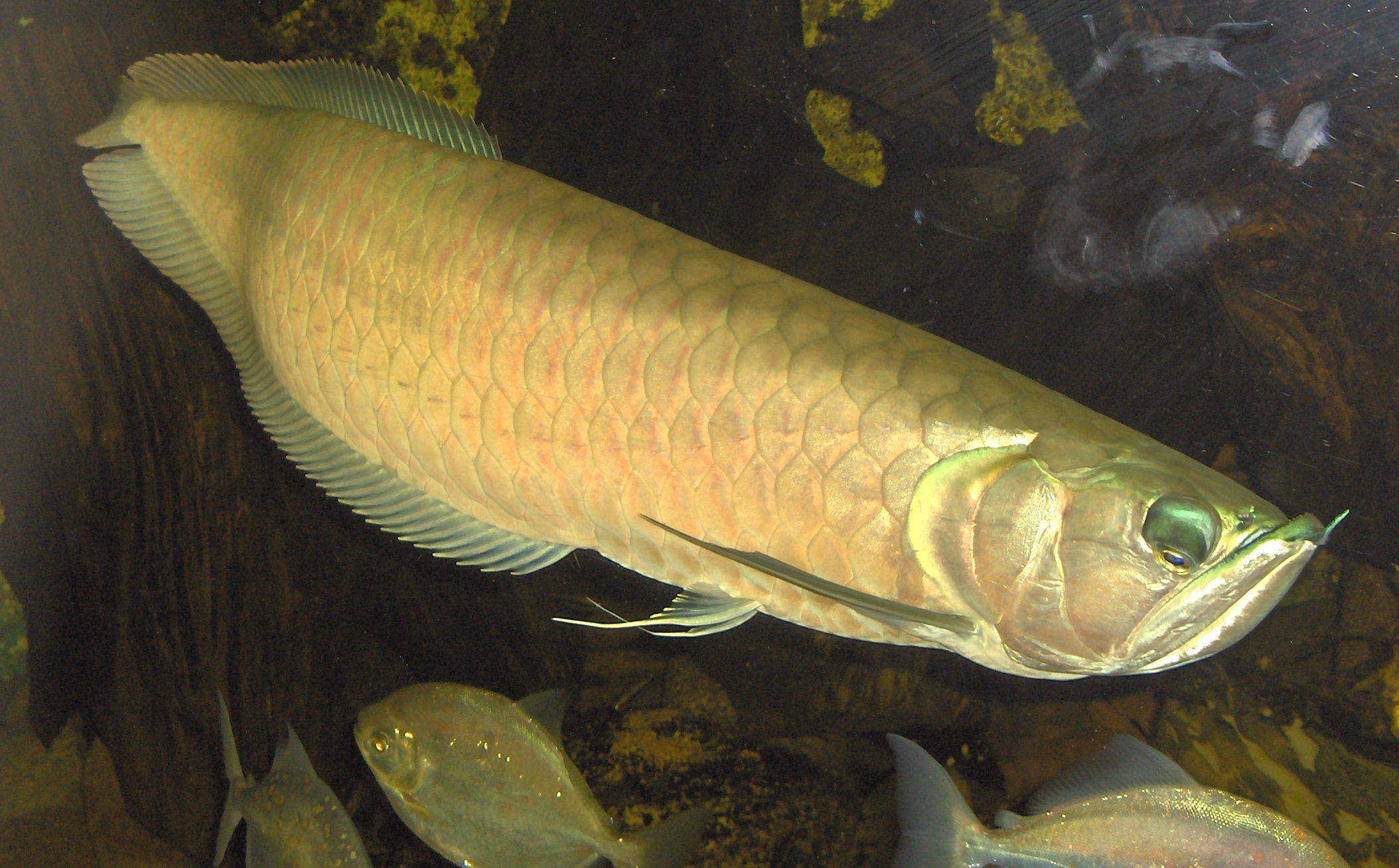
- Osteoglossum bicirrhosum

Scientific classification
- Kingdom: Animalia
- Phylum: Chordata
- Class: Actinopterygii
- Cohort: Osteoglossomorpha
- Order: Osteoglossiformes; L. S. Berg, 1940

Type species
- Osteoglossum bicirrhosum Cuvier (ex Vandelli), 1829

Families
- Pantodontoidei; Pantodontidae (butterflyfish); Osteoglossoidei; †Phareodontidae; †Singidididae; Osteoglossidae (arowana); Notopteroidei; †Ostariostomidae; †Kipalaichthyidae; †Wakinoichthiidae; Notopteridae (featherfin knives); Gymnarchidae (aba); Mormyridae (elephantfishes)

Synonyms
- Mormirimi Rafinesque 1810; Mormyriformes; Scyphophori

= Osteoglossiformes =

Osteoglossiformes Temporal range: Late Jurassic–Recent

Order of fishes

Osteoglossiformes /ˌɒstiːoʊˈɡlɒsɪfɔːrmiːz/, meaning "bony tongues" in Ancient Greek, is a relatively primitive order of ray-finned fish that contains two sub-orders, the Osteoglossoidei and the Notopteroidei. All of at least 245 living species inhabit freshwater. They are found in South America, Africa, Australia and southern Asia, having first evolved in Gondwana before that continent broke up. In 2008, several new species of marine osteoglossiforms were described from the Danish Eocene Fur Formation, dramatically increasing the diversity of this group. This implies that the Osteoglossomorpha is not a primary freshwater fish group with the osteoglossiforms having a typical Gondwana distribution.

The Gymnarchidae (the only species being Gymnarchus niloticus, the African knifefish) and the Mormyridae are weakly electric fish able to sense their prey using electric fields.

The mooneyes (Hiodontidae) are often classified here, but may also be placed in a separate order, Hiodontiformes.

Members of the order are notable for having toothed or bony tongues, and for having the forward part of the gastrointestinal tract pass to the left of the oesophagus and stomach (for all other fish it passes to the right). In other respects, osteoglossiform fishes vary considerably in size and form; the smallest is Pollimyrus castelnaui, at just 2 centimetres (0.79 in) long, while the largest, the arapaima (Arapaima gigas), reaches as much as 2.5 metres (8.2 ft).

== Phylogeny ==
Phylogeny based on the following works:

- Osteoglossiformes
  - Pantodontoidei
    Pantodontidae
  - - Osteoglossoidei
      Osteoglossidae
    - Notopteroidei
      - Notopteroidea
        Notopteridae
      - Mormyroidea
        - Gymnarchidae
        - Mormyridae

== Families ==
Eschmeyer's Catalog of Fishes does not recognise suborders within the order Osteoglossiformes and recognises the following families:

- Family Pantodontidae Peters, 1876 (freshwater butterfly fishes)
- Family Osteoglossidae Bonaparte, 1845 (bonytongues)
- Family Arapaimidae Bonaparte, 1846 (arapaimas)
- Family Notopteridae Bleeker, 1851 (featherfin knifefishes or featherbacks)
  - Subfamily Notopterinae Bleeker, 1851 (Asiatic featherbacks)
  - Subfamily Xenomystinae Greenwood, 1963 (African knifefishes)
- Family Mormyridae Bonaparte, 1831 (elephantfishes)
- Family Gymnarchidae Bleeker, 1859 (abas)
