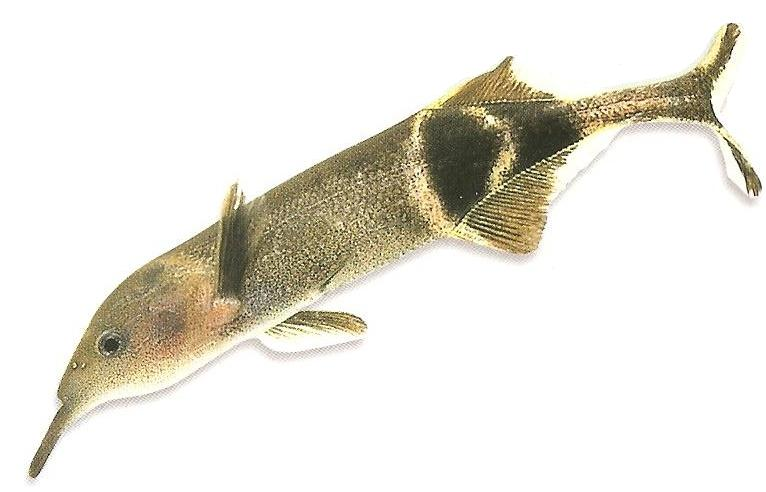
- Elephantnose fish

Scientific classification
- Kingdom: Animalia
- Phylum: Chordata
- Class: Actinopterygii
- Division: Teleostei
- Order: Osteoglossiformes
- Superfamily: Mormyroidea

= Mormyroidea =

Superfamily of fishes

The Mormyroidea (synonymy: Mormyriformes) are a superfamily (formerly an order) of fresh water fishes endemic to Africa that, together with the families Hiodontidae, Osteoglossidae, Pantodontidae and Notopteridae, represents one of the main groups of living Osteoglossiformes. They stand out for their use of weak electric fields, which they use to orient themselves, reproduce, feed, and communicate.

There is no consensus regarding its superior biological classification as some experts state that it belongs to the suborder Osteoglossoidei, while others to the Notopteroidei. In either case, the mormyriformes include the gymnarchids and mormyrids and represent the largest superfamily within the order Osteoglossiformes with about two hundred and thirty-three subordinate taxa that are distributed across various watersheds existing throughout tropical Africa south of the Sahara, including the Nile, Turkana, Gambia, and northern South Africa.

These fish have a large brain and an unusual intelligence, they feed on benthic and allochthonous invertebrates, as well as some crustaceans found in marshy and sandy areas of rivers and lakes. Most of its species are sociable, and although their reproductive form is little known, they generally reproduce during the rainy season and their electrical organs transmit signals with the capacity to influence their reproductive and hormonal behavior.

According to the International Union for Conservation of Nature (IUCN), the conservation status of 66.7% of the species is Least Concern and 10.8% is Threatened species. Furthermore, according to the same institution, the extinction rate of the taxon – at least in the northern region of the African continent – reaches 44.4%, while 55.6% of the individuals are threatened.

== Etymology ==
The term Mormyriformes derives from Greek mormyros, μορμύρος, μόρμυρος, a species of fish that would probably be Lithognathus mormyrus, and from Latin forma, with the same connotation as the English form.

Its synonymy Mormyridae is considered the valid taxonomic status according to the Integrated Taxonomic Information System or ITIS of North America. Although several authors included it within the taxonomic category "order" until after the second half of the 20th century, it is considered as a "superfamily" since the mid 1990s.

== Distribution and ecology ==
=== Ecology ===
This superfamily has a wide adaptability and can be found in freshwater river systems "with high concentrations of suspended solids and reduced transparency", a water hardness of up to 20 °dH and a salinity level of less than 1%. The habitats of these fishes are dominated by mud and/or sandy substrates, plant debris, marginal grasses, filamentous algae or clumps of aquatic plants, while the watercourse can be variable: there are species that inhabit barely torrential waters and others in basins where the water flow is high although with presence of pools and rocks that provide areas with lower streamflow.

=== Distribution ===
These fishes are distributed in various rivers, lakes, and swamps in Africa (south of the Sahara), the Nile, and the higher temperature sectors of South Africa, with an area of approximately 14,080,000 square kilometres (5,440,000 sq mi).

1n 1909, George Albert Boulenger visited the Congo and described forty-seven endemic species, fourteen of them in northern West Africa in the Congo region, eight in West Africa on the Congo and other rivers, seven in the Nile, six in both the Nile and Lake Chad and the Niger and Senegal, and two in Lake Victoria.

In 2003, Didier Paugy, Christian Lévêque, and Guy G. Teugels published a regional synthesis of West African fishes and identified a total of fifteen genera with 41 species in Lower Guinea and fourteen genera with 44 species in West Africa. In 2006, Christian Lévêque and Didier Paugy analyzed the composition of the fish fauna in the most representative rivers and lakes of the main ichthyological provinces of Africa and determined the presence of fifteen species in the Nile, fourteen in Chad, twenty-seven in Niger, sixteen in the Volta River, ten in the Konkouré River, thirteen in the Jong, eight in the Sassandra, ten in the Bandama, fifteen on the Sanaga, twenty-two on the Ogôoué, six on the Ruaha, 109 on the Congo, and ten on the Zambèze. Additionally, within the freshwater or epicontinental species of the richest African aquatic systems, 19 of them are found in the Niger River, 75 in the Congo River and 16 others in the Zambezi River. (Note: From the point of view of their fish richness, the rivers Niger, Nile, Congo, Zambezi and the great lakes of Central Africa are the most relevant.)

In 2008, Melanie L. J. Stiassny, Guy G. Teugels and Carl Hopkins evaluated the geographic distribution of genera in the subfamily Mormyrinae and indicated that at least fourteen are found in Lower Guinea; the remainder can be found in Congo as in the case of Genomyrus, Angola as in Heteromormyrus, Nilo-Sudan as in Hyperopisus and Cyphomyrus, and South Africa as in Cyphomyrus. In addition, the same authors indicated that at least six species in the subfamily Petrocephalinae are in Lower Guinea, while in 2012, several researchers from the universities of Regensburg and Heidelberg, in conjunction with the South African Institute for Aquatic Biodiversity, indicated the presence of several new species in the rivers Luongo, Lufubu, Zambezi, Boro, Cunene, Thoage, and the Okavango Delta.

== Morphology ==
=== Sizes and shapes ===
The superfamily Mormyridae has a high diversity within its more than 200 species and subspecies, with a range of sizes and shapes that varies according to the family of membership and their respective genus. The smallest can measure around four centimetres (1.6 in) in their adult stage, while the largest can reach 150 centimetres (59 in), although a specimen belonging to Gymnarchus niloticus which reached a size of 167 centimetres (66 in) is known to exist in the Loumbila reserve, near Ouagadougou. Its body has cycloid scales, small eyes – which in the case of mormyrids are covered with skin – and a mouth that is not protractile which may vary depending on the genus:.

1. The genera Campylomormyrus, Gnathonemus and Mormyrus possess a particularly prominent extending mouth that usually consists of a flexible fleshy elongation attached to the lower jaw and is equipped with touch and probably taste sensors, which is why they are popularly called "elephant-nose fishes".
2. The genera Mormyrops, Brienomyrus, Hippopotamyrus, Marcusenius, Petrocephalus, and Pollimyrus possess small barbs and usually lack the extended mouthparts of elephantfishes, hence they are called "Nile river pikes".
3. The genus Gymnarchus has a prominent snout with "strong, pointed or notched teeth that line up in a single row on both jaws."

=== Brain and cerebellum ===
The brain of this superfamily is one of the largest among fishes and has a body-proportional size comparable to that of humans, with a brain-to-body mass ratio ranging from 1/52 to 1/82, and possibly associated with the ability to interpret bioelectrical signals. Since the pioneering work of Michael Pius Erdl in 1846, several researchers have made efforts toward describing the development of this organ and its functionality.

Thus, based on the analysis of larvae and embryos of Pollimyrus (Marcusenius) Isidori, it is known that "the brain develops very rapidly: the corpus cerebelli (c.cer) and cerebellar structures, i.e. eminentia granularis (e. gr), lobus caudalis (lc) and transitorius (lt), lobi lineae lateralis (lll), are formed in 40 days, whereas valve development needs 180." They possess a hypertrophy in the cerebellum, which the literature refers to as mormyrocerebellum or gigantocerebellum, "probably related to his unique electrogenic and electroreceptive abilities" and to the large size of the valve, which in turn relates to the electrosensory system present in these fish.

It has been found that for species living in oxygen-deficient aquatic environments, they protect their brains from damage caused by hypoxia through efficient use of existing oxygen. Furthermore, among its species, Gnathonemus petersii was found to hold the record among vertebrates – including humans – as the one whose brain consumes at least 60% of all body oxygen.

=== Electric organs ===
Elephantfish with the central nervous system in green, the electroreceptors in blue, and the electric organ in red. In this species, the electroreceptors are at highest density in the 'elephantnose' snout, which is actively moved to help locate prey.

Mormyriformes can produce weak electric signals with a specialized organ discovered in 1951 by the British-Ukrainian researcher Hans Lissmann after observing a live specimen of Gymnarchus niloticus. Such an organ is evolutionarily derived from muscle cells, and there is a degree of convergent evolution in form and function with the Gymnotiformes of South America, especially in the sensory apparatus for detecting and processing electrical signals involving electrocommunication and electrolocation processes.

==== Ampullary organ ====
Ampullae of Lorenzini are electroreceptors "extremely sensitive to low-frequency fields of biotic or abiotic origin and are generally used in the context of passive electrolocation", with a high sensitivity of 0.01 mV/cm and sensitive to DC fields or frequencies lower than 50 Hz.

==== Tuberous organs ====
Mormyromast, a type of electroreceptor found only in the skin of Mormyrid fishes

These fish have two types of tuberous electroreceptor: (Note: Also present in Gymnotiformes fishes.) the Knollenorgan and the Mormyromast. Both organs are found in adult individuals, where they are lightly covered by epithelial cells and skin, while their sensitivity ranges from 0.1 mV and 10 mV/cm/ Tens of Hz up to more than a kHz.

The knollenorgan was first described in 1921 as an epidermal organ by the German anatomist Victor Franz for a Marcusenius species, although without discovering its function. It is composed of a set of receptor cells that can reach between 40 and 60 microns in diameter; these are located under the skin and have a sensitivity of approximately 0.1 mV/cm.

The mormyromast appeared under the name Schnauzenorgan ('Snout organ') in a paper by Walter Stendell in 1914, where he described it as a combination of the sensory and glandular apparatus for a species of Mormyrus. The larval form of the receptor, the promormyromast, differs from the adult's in cellular composition, distribution in the epidermis and innervation. This organ is one of the most abundant in mormyriforms, with a high concentration of electroreceptors in the epidermis per cm^{2}: for example, for Gnathonemus petersii there are about 2000 per cm², versus a maximum of 50 receptors per cm² for ampullary organs and knollenorgans. In 2009, Engelmann and colleagues showed that G. petersii actively moves its elongated "elephantnose" chin to localise prey accurately, i.e. this species has an active sensory-motor loop that links electroreception to "active motor exploration of the environment".

== Behavior ==
=== Communication ===
Some species of mormyriformes, predominantly in the mormyridae family, are sociable, attentive and intelligent, whereas the gymnarchidae are solitary, unintelligent and even aggressive.

These fish have the ability to produce and analyze weak electric fields through a specialized organ, (electric organ discharges), which Lissmann and coworkers first analyzed in 1958 through several experiments. Such electric fields provide these fish with a specialized sensory system for communication and orientation.

EODs are useful for orientation, finding food and communication, whose frequency is variable; fields allow them to locate objects and react to other animals in turbid waters – or waters of reduced transparency – where their vision is affected by the presence of organic matter and suspended solids.

This system is a recurrent subject of scientific research, particularly in the field of inter- (and intra-) species communication, as well as in studies of electrophysiology and behavior.

EODs are often pulsatile, with frequencies exceeding 130 Hz for the most aggressive, except in the case of Gymnarchus, whose electrical organs discharge at between 300 and 500 Hz under normal conditions, giving a sinusoidal appearance to the discharge.

=== Feeding ===
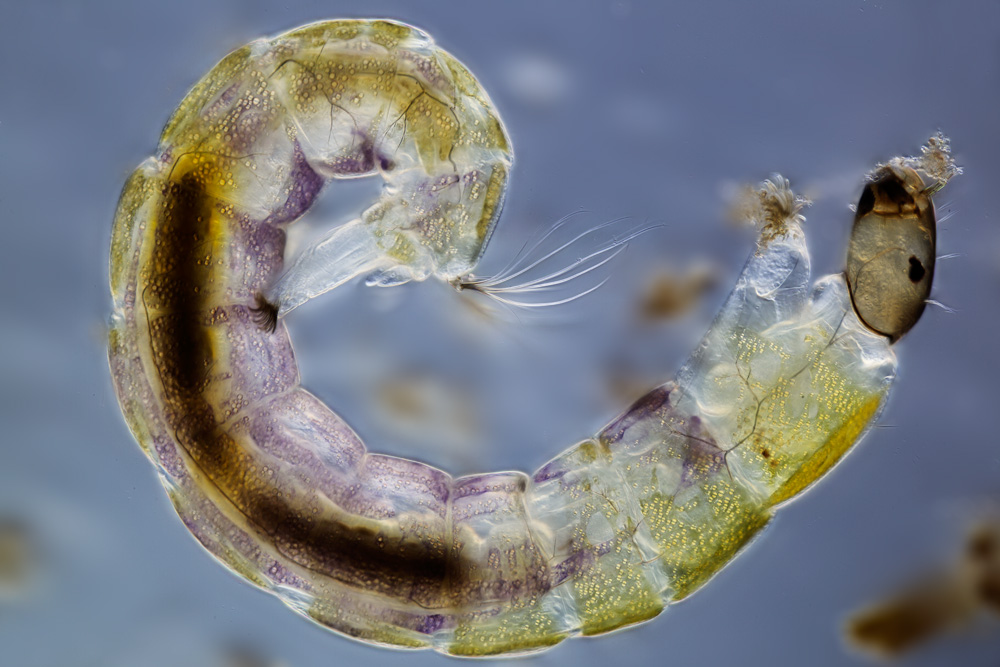
Larva of a chironomidae.

Feeding generally consists of small invertebrates buried in muddy substrates, marshy areas and sandy riverbank areas; thus, throughout the year certain species consume some crustaceans found on the banks of running rivers, larvae and pupas of chironomids, coarse particulate organic matter and mud/sand.

The diet of this superfamily may change depending on seasonal variations in rainfall, since while in dry season some species supplement their diet with high amounts of larvae of Trichoptera, in rainy season this includes Ephemeroptera.

The trophic flexibility of mormyriformes allows them to survive in the diverse ecosystems they inhabit, so it is possible to find in their diet from benthic invertebrates to allochthonous, while in some species there are no differences regarding their diet if sex and/or season are considered.

=== Reproduction ===
Electrical signal from courtship of a male Paramormyrops specimen in Gabon

The breadth of species within the superfamily Mormyridae results in a paucity of information on their reproduction and intergeneric relationships, which is limited in both behavioral and biological terms. However, and in comparison to the electric fishes Gymnotiformes of South America, there is a greater understanding regarding their reproduction: it is known that much of the species reproduces in the rainy season and their specialized electrical organs generate pulses that form an electromotor system that transmits electrical signals with the ability to influence their reproductive and hormonal behavior, such as in 11-Ketotestosterone levels. (Note: 11-Ketotestosterone functions as the endogenous sex hormone androgenic in fish.)

Courtship takes place at the beginning of the rainy season, as the water level within the riverine sectors increases and decreases its conductivity —and the pH-value—; some species migrate towards the flooded areas, and during the mating season produce certain sounds and electrical discharge patterns. Other specimens build nests (as in the case of Pollimyrus and Gymnarchus which make floating nests of plant material) or migrate seeking shallow, non-torrential areas with sandy loamy bottoms (such as Brienomyrus longianalis), while some others dig holes in the ground to spawn.

There is little information regarding the larval and egg morphology of this superfamily, a situation that is repeated in virtually the entire osteoglossomorpha superorder. In this regard, there are data for some species such as Hyperopisus bebe, Pollimyrus adspersus, Mormyrus rume proboscirostris, Campylomormyrus tamandua, Hippopotamyrus pictus and Petrocephalus soudanensis, although only in the case of Pollimyrus isidor an analysis on its embryonic and larval development is appreciated.

Eggs are variable in size, with a probable maximum size of about 10 millimeters in diameter as occurs in gymnarchids. After laying the eggs, both the male and female guard the nest, while after eighteen days, they hatch and the larvae swim freely.

== Classification ==
The first respectable classification for some of the species in this superfamily appeared in Volume I of the tenth edition of Linnaeus's Systema Naturae in 1758 (Note: The tenth edition of Systema naturae per regna tria naturae, secundum classes, ordines, genera, species, cum characteribus, differentiis, synonymis, locis is considered the starting point of zoological nomenclature.) which, based on John Ray's Synopsis methodica Animalium (1693), included the genus Mormyrus within the order Branchiostegui. Since this work, various changes occurred within the international zoological literature, and it was not until the appearance of the International Code of Zoological Nomenclature in 1905 where the subordination of taxa followed a homogeneous pattern.

Thus, while in the 1950s the mormyriformes included the families Mormyridae, Notopteridae and Hiodontidae within the Clupeiformes group, as early as the 1960s was regarded as an order containing the families Mormyridae and Gymnarchidae. In 1972, Louis Taverne proposed the inclusion as a suborder to the Mormyridae and Gymnarchoidea, which in turn agglutinated the families Mormyridae — with the subfamilies Petrocephalinae and Mormyrinae — and Gymnarchidae and Gymnarchidae respectively. His analysis considered osteological and external morphological characteristics, in addition to proposing a phylogenetic tree and reaffirming its inclusion within the osteoglossomorphs, a superorder of primarily marine teleostei fishes proposed by Peter Humphry Greenwood, Donn E. Rosen, Stanley H. Weitzman and George S. Myers in Phyletic Studies of Teleostean Fishes, with a Provisional Classification of Living Forms of 1966.

According to the Integrated Taxonomic Information System, the superfamily Mormyridae includes 233 subordinate taxa, with two families, twenty genera, 186 species, and 15 subspecies; such a classification maintains the logic proposed by Taverne.

=== Family Gymnarchidae (Bleeker, 1859) ===
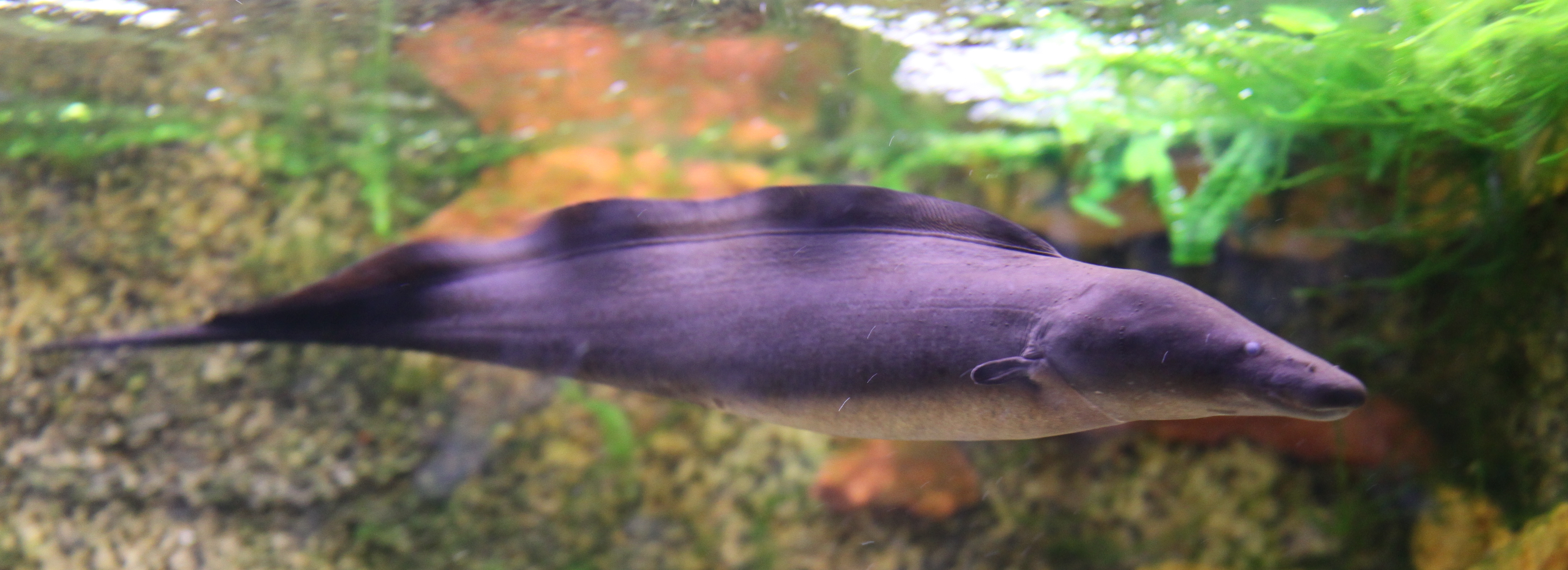
Gymnarchus niloticus

The Gymnarchidae are a family containing the genus Gymnarchus — a name proposed by Georges Cuvier in the second edition of his Le Règne Animal in 1829 — and contains a single species: Gymnarchus niloticus, which is found exclusively in swamps and vegetated edges in the Nile, Turkana, Chad, Niger, Volta, Senegal, and Gambia.

The scientific name of this family comes from Pieter Bleeker, who first used it in a series of articles in the journal Natuurkundig tijdschrift voor Nederlandsch Indië of 1859.

=== Family Mormyridae (Bonaparte, 1832) ===
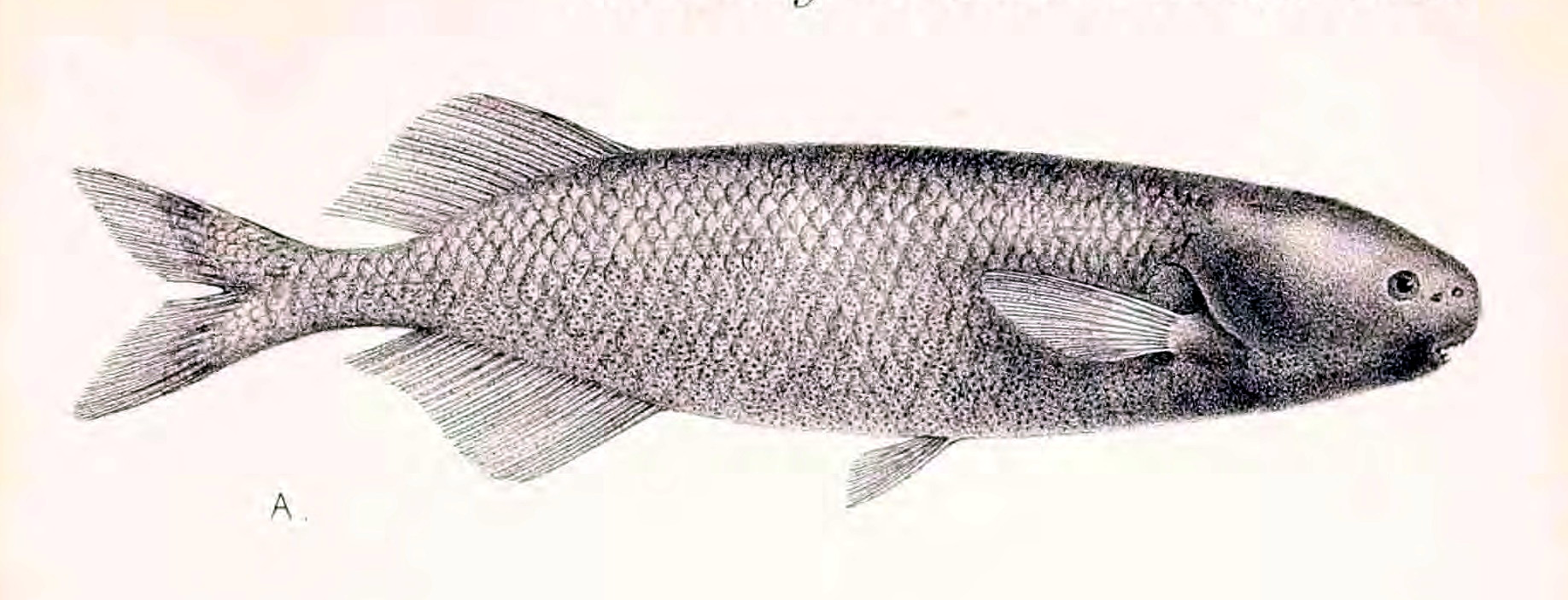
Paramormyrops kingsleyae (Günther, 1896), of the genus Paramormyrops in the subfamily Mormyrinae.

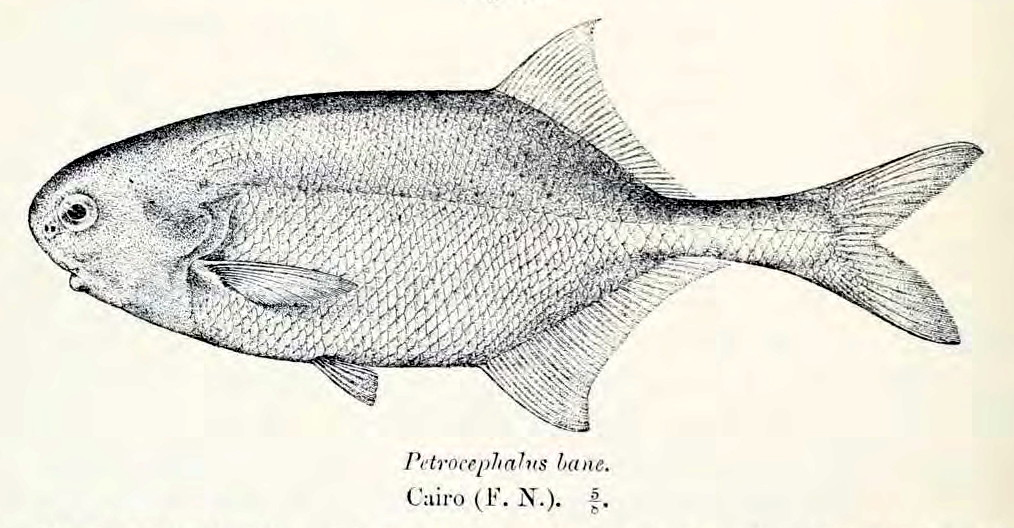
Petrocephalus bane (Lacepède, 1803), of the genus Petrocephalus in the subfamily Petrocephalinae.

The Mormyridae represent the most extensive family in that order with about two hundred species distributed throughout various river basins of tropical Africa south of the Sahara and the Nile.

The scientific name of this family comes from Charles Lucien Bonaparte, who first proposed it in Iconografia della Fauna Italica per le quattro Classi degli Animali Vertebrati of 1832, while the subfamilies received their designation from Taverne in Ostéologie des genres Mormyrus Linné, Mormyrops Müller, Hyperopisus Gill, Isichthys Gill, Myomyrus Boulenger, Stomatorhinus Boulenger et Gymnarchus Cuvier. Considérations générales sur la systématique des poissons d l'ordre des mormyriformes of 1972:

1. The subfamily Petrocephalinae contains only one genus of the family Mormyridae (Petrocephalus), so it forms a monophyletic group within it, with approximately forty species and subspecies, some of them discovered only in 2012.
2. The subfamily Mormyrinae contains almost all the genera of the family Mormyridae, making it one of the largest subfamilies in the order Osteoglossiformes. There are approximately one hundred and seventy species in nineteen genera:
- Boulengeromyrus (Taverne y Géry, 1968)
- Brevimyrus (Taverne, 1971)
- Brienomyrus (Taverne, 1971)
- Campylomormyrus (Bleeker, 1874)
- Cyphomyrus (Pappenheim, 1906)
- Genyomyrus (Boulenger, 1898)
- Gnathonemus (Gill, 1863)
- Heteromormyrus (Steindachner, 1866)
- Hippopotamyrus (Pappenheim, 1906)
- Hyperopisus (Gill, 1862)
- Isichthys (Gill, 1863)
- Ivindomyrus (Taverne y Géry, 1975)
- Marcusenius (Gill, 1862)
- Mormyrops (J. P. Müller, 1843)
- Mormyrus (Linnaeus, 1758)
- Myomyrus (Boulenger, 1898)
- Oxymormyrus (Bleeker, 1874)
- Paramormyrops (Taverne, Thys van den audenaerde y Heymer, 1977)
- Pollimyrus (Taverne, 1971)
- Stomatorhinus (Boulenger, 1898)

Particularly for the genus Campylomormyrus, at least fourteen species are accepted – by virtue of the taxonomic revision carried out by Poll – although their number is still subject to debate since the exact number accepted in the literature varies from three to sixteen, by virtue of the morphological analyses carried out by their authors.

=== Phylogeny ===
There is no consensus regarding the origin and diversification of the species belonging to this superfamily, since while some suggest that it appeared before the separation between Africa and South America, others indicate that it was later.

One of the oldest fossils corresponds to a partial dentition of a species of Gymnarchus that lived at the end of the Eocene — about 37 million years ago – in the Faiyum oasis of Egypt, and succeeding remains of the genus Hyperopisus in Pliocene deposits in Wadi El Natrun of Egypt and from the Plio-Pleistocene — more recent than 5 million years ago – in Uganda, Lake Edward, and the Semliki River in Congo.

In 1999, it was estimated on the basis of Mitochondrial DNA from thirteen species – two Petrocephalinae, one Gymnarchidae and ten Mormyrinae — that the core group of the mormyriformes could be between 60.69 and 71.98 million years old, while a year later, a date of 242 ± 23 million years was determined, though through the construction of a molecular phylogeny with nucleotide sequences of two mitochondrial genes from 12 species of Osteoglossiformes. In 2009, a new estimate was made with the species Brienomyrus Niger and Gnathonemus petersii, which determined 162 ± 24 million years.

The following cladogram shows the relationship between the different families of Mormyriformes outlined by Sébastien Lavoué and colleagues:

- Mormyroidea
  - Mormyridae
    - Mormyrinae
      - - - - - - - - Campylomormyrus
                    - Gnathonemus
                  - - Genyomyrus
                    - Marcusenius
                - - Hyperopisus
                  - - Brevimyrus
                    - Hippopotamyrus
              - - - Pollimyrus
                  - Stomatorhinus
                - - - Boulengeromyrus
                    - Ivindomyrus
                  - Paramormyrops
            - Mormyrus
          - - Brienomyrus
            - Isichthys
        - Mormyrops
      - Myomyrus
    - Petrocephalinae
      Petrocephalus
  - Gymnarchidae
    - Gymnarchus

== Threats and protection ==
According to the information available for the 178 species assessed by the IUCN, the conservation status of the species associated with this superfamily is heterogeneous: 118 can be categorized as "least concern (LC or LR/lc)", 15 as "vulnerable (VU)", 3 as "near threatened (NT or LR/nt)" and 4 as "endangered (EN)".

The global status of mormyrids and gymnarchids is unclear, since there are accurate and systematic data only for the North African region, where the extinction rate of the former taxon in 2011 is estimated at 44.4% with 55.6% of individuals in danger, while for the latter, the IUCN recommends greater efforts to census its population and the threats that afflict it.

The main threats depend on the geographic area, country or river basin:

- Several species have economic importance in the areas where they inhabit, including Hyperopisus bebe, Mormyrus rume, Gymnarchus niloticus or the Campylomormyrus bredoi, whose overfishing with trawl nets elevated it to vulnerable status. According to estimates by the Fisheries and Aquaculture Department of the FAO, catches as of 2009 worldwide reached 35 685 tons of mormyrids and 13 901 tons of gymnarchids, representing an increase of 183.9% and 52.8% respectively since 2002.
- Externalities due to mining activities on the banks of various rivers are also a cause of threat, observable in the case of Ivindomyrus opdenboschi in the Ntem and Ivindo rivers or the Marcusenius cuangoanus in the banks of the Kasai River.
- Habitat loss and degradation due to agriculture, urban development, and deforestation is also a source of threat, as in the case of Marcusenius brucii, the Marcusenius abadii in the Black Volta or the Oti/Pendjari River, the Marcusenius furcidens in the Tano River or the Mormyrus cyaneus in the Bas-Congo.

On the other hand, the conservation actions implemented are scarce or non-existent for most species, of low impact, and with unknown results.
