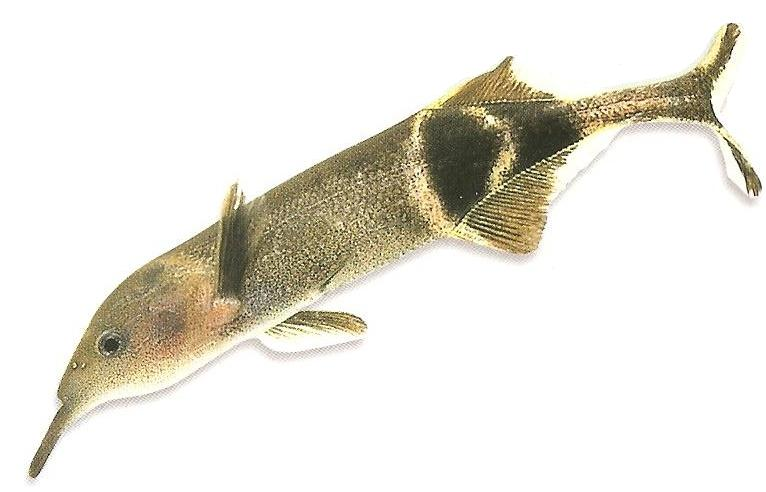
- The Peters' elephantnose fish, Gnathonemus petersii, has the largest brain-to-body weight ratio of all known vertebrates.

Scientific classification
- Kingdom: Animalia
- Phylum: Chordata
- Class: Actinopterygii
- Order: Osteoglossiformes
- Family: Mormyridae
- Subfamily: Mormyrinae

Genera
- see text

= Mormyrinae =

Subfamily of fishes

The subfamily Mormyrinae contains all but one of the genera of the African freshwater fish family Mormyridae in the order Osteoglossiformes. They are often called elephantfish due to a long protrusion below their mouths used to detect buried invertebrates that is suggestive of a tusk or trunk (some such as Marcusenius senegalensis gracilis are sometimes called trunkfish though this term is usually associated with an unrelated group of fish). They can also be called tapirfish.

Fish in this subfamily have a high brain to body mass ratio due to an expanded cerebellum (called a gigantocerebellum) used in their electroperception. Linked to this they are notable for holding the zoological record at around 60% as the brains that consume the most energy as a percentage of the body's metabolic rate of any animal. Previous to this discovery, it was the “human brain, which had been thought to hold the record in this respect”.^{p. 605} The human brain in comparison uses only 20%.

Mormyrinae is the largest subfamily in the Osteoglossiformes order with around 170 species.

== Unique brain percentage of body energy consumption ==
The range with which the adult brain in all animals regardless of body size consumes energy as a percentage of the body's energy is roughly 2% to 8%. The only exceptions of animal brains using more than 10% (in terms of O_{2} intake) are a few primates (11–13%) and humans. However, research published in 1996 in The Journal of Experimental Biology by Göran Nilsson at Uppsala University found that mormyrinae brains utilize roughly 60% of their body O_{2} consumption. This is due to the combination of large brain size (3.1% of body mass compared to 2% in humans) and them being ectothermic.

The body energy expenditure of ectothermic animals is about 1/13 of that of endotherms but the energy expenditure of the brains of both ectothermic and endothermic animals are similar. Other high brain percentage (2.6–3.7 % of the body mass) animals exist such as bats, swallows, crows and sparrows but these due to their endothermy also have high body energy metabolism. The unusual high brain energy consumption percentage of mormyrinae fish is thus due to them having the unusual combination of a large brain in a low energy consuming body. The actual energy consumption per unit mass of its brain is not in fact particularly high and indeed lower (2.02 mg g^{1} h^{1}) than that in some other fish such as Salmonidae (2.20 mg g^{−1} h^{−1}). In comparison, that of rats is 6.02 mg g^{−1} h^{−1} and humans 2.61 mg g^{−1} h^{−1}.^{Table 1}

The oxygen for this in low oxygen conditions comes from gulping air at the water surface.

=== Large brains ===
Unlike mammals, the part of the brain enlarged in mormyrinae fish is the cerebellum not the cerebrum and reflecting this is called a gigantocerebellum. This enlarged cerebellum links to their electroreception. They generate weak electrical fields from specialized electric organ muscles. To detect these fields from those created by other mormyrinae fish, their prey animals, and how their nearby environment distorts them, their skin contains three types of electroreceptors. The electroperception they enable is used in hunting prey, electrolocation, and communication (Knollenorgans are the specialized electrical detection organs for this function). This electroperception, however, requires complex information processing in special neurocircuitry since it is dependent upon the ability to distinguish between self-generated and other generated electric fields, and their self-created aspects and their environment modification. To enable this specialized information processing, with each self-generated electrical discharge, an efference copy of it is made for comparison with the detected electric field it creates. The cerebellum plays a key role in processing such efference copy dependent perception. The muddy waters where they live has resulted in such electroperception playing a key role in their survival and this has resulted in their gigantocerebellum.

== Classification ==
The classification by osteology-based traits of Mormyridae into the two subfamilies of Mormyrinae and Petrocephalinae has been confirmed using molecular phylogeny methods. The classification below comes from FishBase.

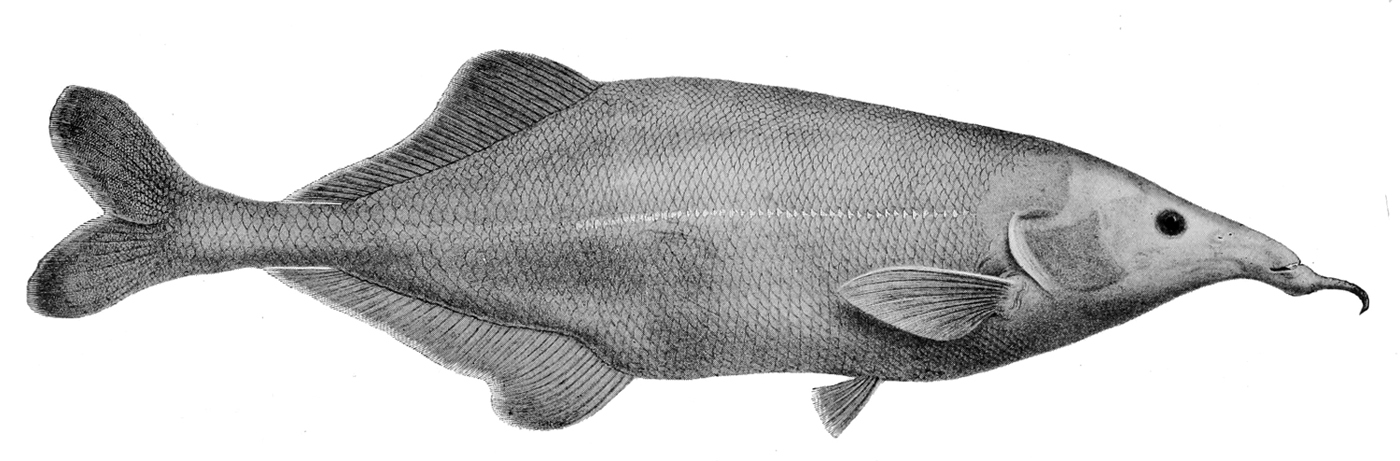
Genyomyrus donnyi

- Subfamily Mormyrinae
  - Boulengeromyrus Taverne & Géry, 1968
  - Brevimyrus Taverne, 1971
  - Brienomyrus Taverne, 1971
  - Campylomormyrus Bleeker, 1874
  - Cyphomyrus Pappenheim, 1906
  - Genyomyrus Boulenger, 1898
  - Gnathonemus Gill, 1863
  - Heteromormyrus Steindachner, 1866
  - Hippopotamyrus Pappenheim, 1906
  - Hyperopisus Gill, 1862
  - Isichthys Gill, 1863
  - Ivindomyrus Taverne & Géry, 1975
  - Marcusenius Gill, 1862
  - Mormyrops J. P. Müller, 1843
  - Mormyrus Linnaeus, 1758
  - Myomyrus Boulenger, 1898
  - Oxymormyrus Bleeker, 1874
  - Paramormyrops Taverne, Thys van den audenaerde& Heymer, 1977
  - Pollimyrus Taverne, 1971
  - Stomatorhinus Boulenger, 1898

== In culture ==
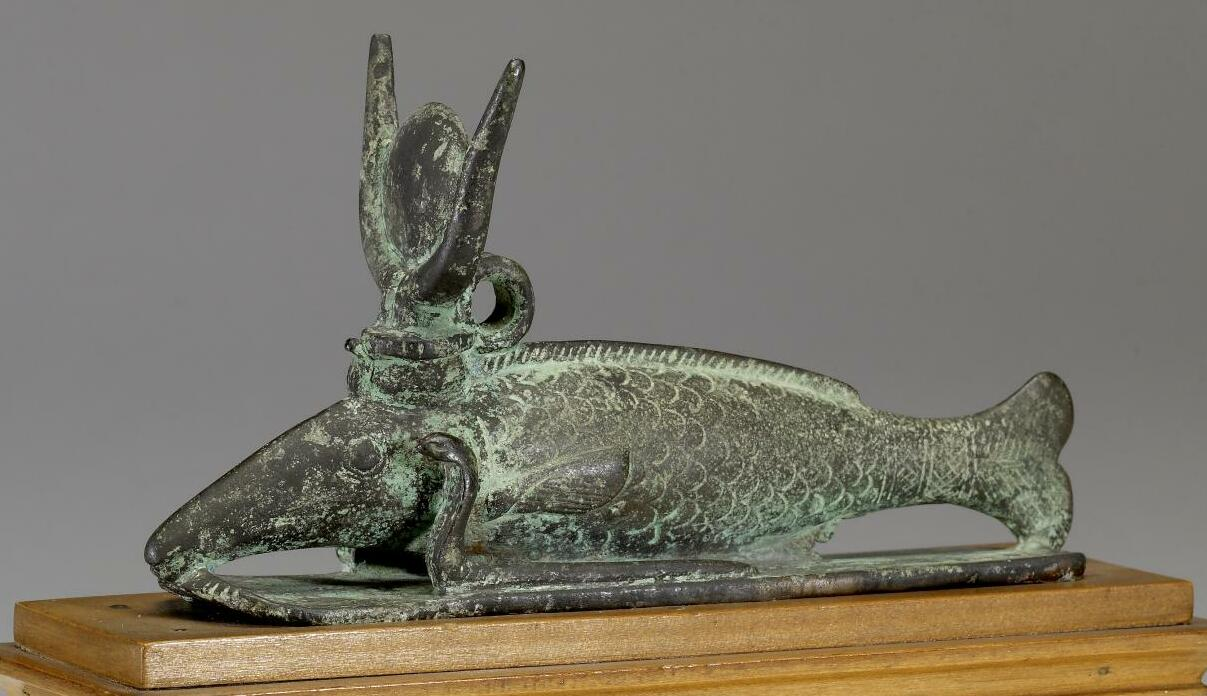
Bronze figurine of Oxyrhynchus fish, Late Period-Ptolemaic Egypt

The Medjed was a sacred fish in Ancient Egypt. At the city of Per-Medjed, better known as Oxyrhynchus, whose name means "sharp-nosed" after the fish, archaeologists have found fishes depicted as bronze figurines, mural paintings, or wooden coffins in the shape of fishes with downturned snouts, with horned sun-disc crowns like those of the goddess Hathor. The depictions have been described as resembling members of the genus Mormyrus.
