= Graham's stonebasher =

Conservation status
- Least Concern (IUCN 3.1)

Scientific classification
- Kingdom: Animalia
- Phylum: Chordata
- Class: Actinopterygii
- Order: Osteoglossiformes
- Family: Mormyridae
- Genus: Hippopotamyrus
- Species: H. grahami

Binomial name
- Hippopotamyrus grahami (Norman, 1928)

Species of ray-finned fish

Graham's stonebasher (Hippopotamyrus grahami) is a species of ray-finned fish in the family Mormyridae. It is found in Kenya, Rwanda, Tanzania, and Uganda. Its natural habitats are rivers, swamps, freshwater lakes, freshwater marshes, and inland deltas. It is threatened by habitat loss.
