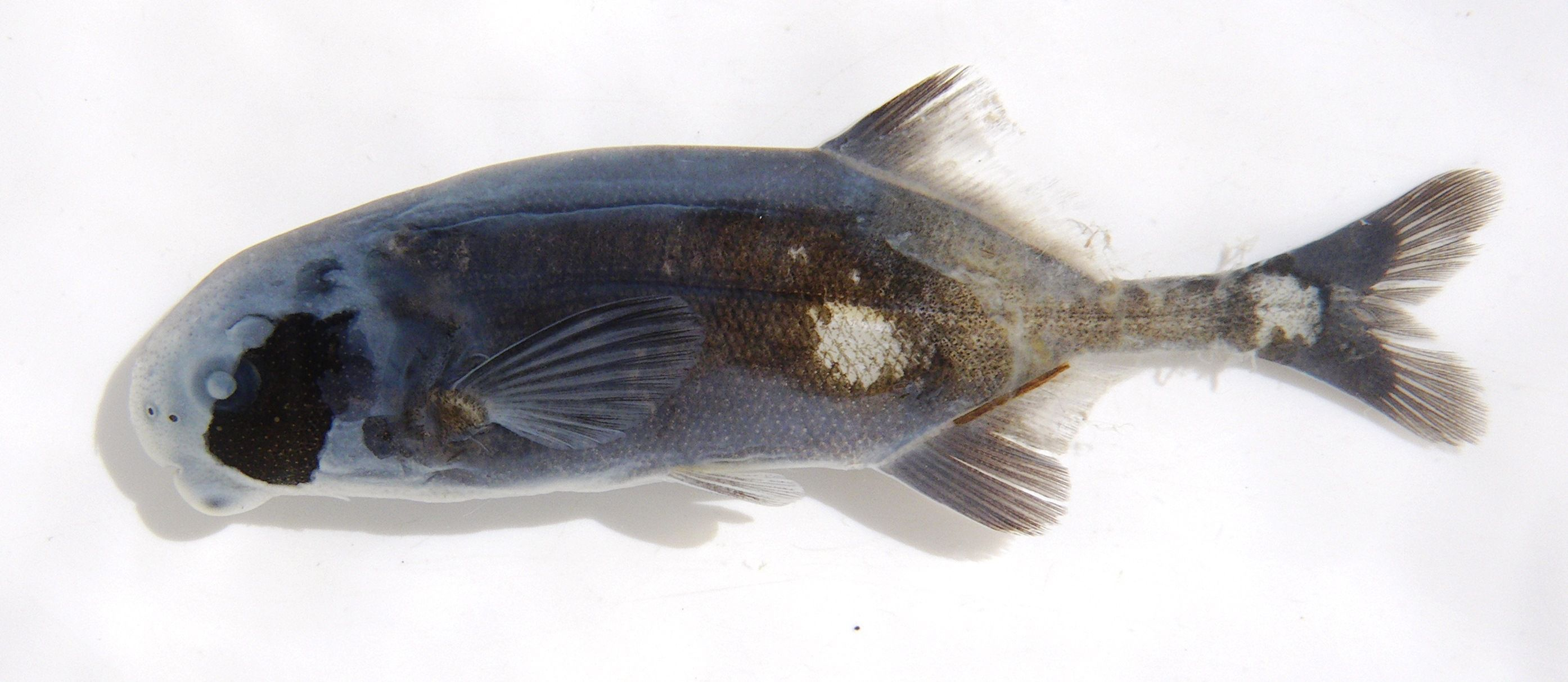
- Cyphomyrus sp. collected in Lavushi Manda National Park, Zambia. Small 49mm specimen. Species unclear.

Scientific classification
- Kingdom: Animalia
- Phylum: Chordata
- Class: Actinopterygii
- Order: Osteoglossiformes
- Family: Mormyridae
- Genus: Cyphomyrus
- Species: C. discorhynchus

Binomial name
- Cyphomyrus discorhynchus (W. K. H. Peters, 1852)

= Zambezi parrotfish =

Species of ray-finned fish

The Zambezi parrotfish (Cyphomyrus discorhynchus) is an elephantfish in the family Mormyridae. It occurs in several river and lake systems across Central Africa and the northern half of Southern Africa. It grows to a length of 31 cm (12 in).
