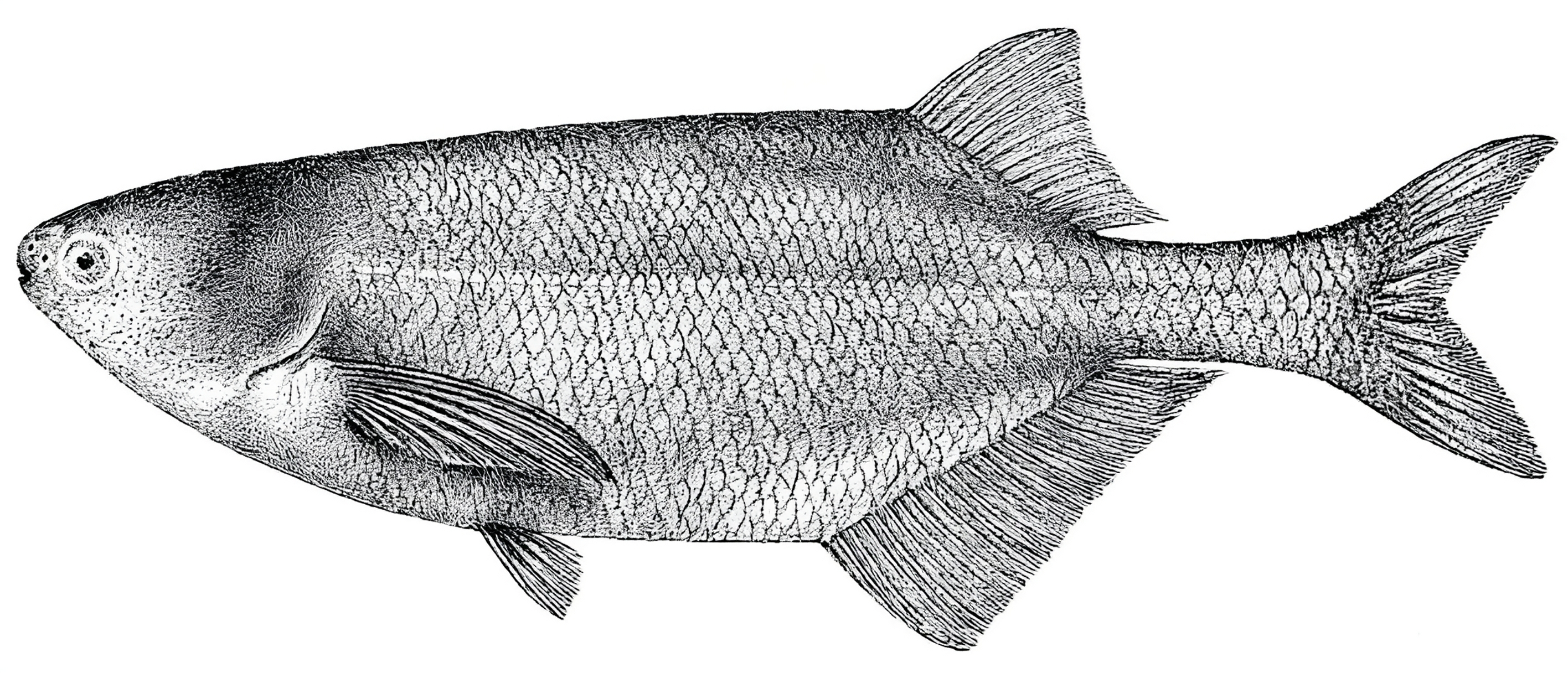

Conservation status
- Least Concern (IUCN 3.1)

Scientific classification
- Kingdom: Animalia
- Phylum: Chordata
- Class: Actinopterygii
- Order: Osteoglossiformes
- Family: Mormyridae
- Genus: Brevimyrus
- Species: B. niger

Binomial name
- Brevimyrus niger (Günther, 1866)

= Brevimyrus niger =

Species of fish

Brevimyrus niger is an African freshwater fish of the family Mormyridae.

== Taxonomy ==
Brevimyrus niger is the sole species in the genus Brevimyrus.

== Distribution and habitat ==
The fish is widespread throughout Western Africa and lives the basins of the Senegal River, Chad, Niger, and many others.
