= Labeobarbus fasolt =

Conservation status
- Least Concern (IUCN 3.1)

Scientific classification
- Kingdom: Animalia
- Phylum: Chordata
- Class: Actinopterygii
- Order: Cypriniformes
- Family: Cyprinidae
- Subfamily: Torinae
- Genus: Labeobarbus
- Species: L. fasolt

Binomial name
- Labeobarbus fasolt (Pappenheim, 1914)

Synonyms
- Barbus fasolt Pappenheim, 1914

Species of fish

Labeobarbus fasolt is a species of ray-finned fish in the genus Labeobarbus which is found only in rivers in the Democratic Republic of the Congo.
