= Brienomyrus brachyistius =

Conservation status
- Least Concern (IUCN 3.1)

Scientific classification
- Kingdom: Animalia
- Phylum: Chordata
- Class: Actinopterygii
- Division: Teleostei
- Order: Osteoglossiformes
- Family: Mormyridae
- Genus: Brienomyrus
- Species: B. brachyistius

Binomial name
- Brienomyrus brachyistius (Gill, 1862)

Synonyms
- Brienomyrus brachyhistius (Gill, 1862); Marcusenius brachyistius Gill, 1862; Mormyrus brachyistius (Gill, 1862); Mormyrus liberiensis Steindachner, 1894; Mormyrus microcephalus Günther, 1867

Species of ray-finned fish

Brienomyrus brachyistius is a species of elephantfish native to Angola, Benin, Cameroon, Congo, Democratic Republic of Congo, Cote d'Ivoire, Equatorial Guinea, Gabon, Gambia, Ghana, Guinea, Liberia, Nigeria, Senegal, Sierra Leone, and Togo.
