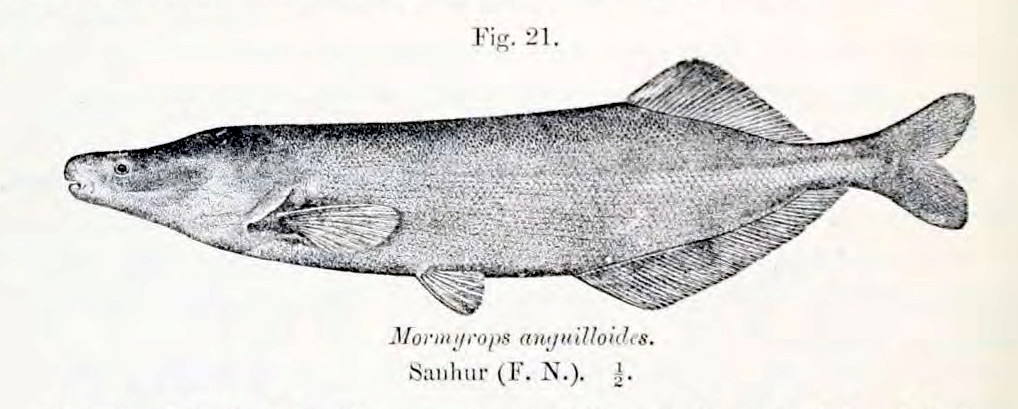

Conservation status
- Least Concern (IUCN 3.1)

Scientific classification
- Kingdom: Animalia
- Phylum: Chordata
- Class: Actinopterygii
- Division: Teleostei
- Order: Osteoglossiformes
- Family: Mormyridae
- Genus: Mormyrops
- Species: M. anguilloides

Binomial name
- Mormyrops anguilloides (Linnaeus, 1758)

Synonyms
- Mormyrus anguilloides Linnaeus, 1758; Mormyrus swanenburgi Schilthuis, 1891; Mormyrus tuckeyi Valenciennes, 1847; Mormyrus zambanenje Peters, 1852; Mormyrops anguilloides voltae Roman, 1966; Mormyrops longiceps Günther, 1867; Oxyrhynchus deliciosus Leach, 1818

= Cornish jack =

Species of ray-finned fish

The Cornish jack, Mormyrops anguilloides, is a species of weakly electric fish in the family Mormyridae, native to quiet waters in much of Sub-Saharan Africa. The largest species in its family, the Cornish jack is a nocturnal group hunter of smaller fishes, using electricity to locate its prey and communicate with other members of its group. It is a commercial game fish valued for its size and taste.

The common name "Cornish jack" likely originated from European settlers, who thought that this fish resembled the European pike, whose young is known as a "jack" in some parts of England. It is also known as "African carp", a name that is used for several other species.

== Distribution and habitat ==
The Cornish jack occurs in the White Nile, the Lake Albert drainage basin, inland waters from Senegal to Chad, rivers in Cameroon, and small coastal basins in the Guinean zone. It is also widespread in the Congo River basin, Lakes Malawi and Tanganyika, the Volta River basin, the Shebelle River, and the Jubba River. In southern Africa, it is restricted to the middle and lower Zambezi, and the Buzi and Pungwe Rivers.

This demersal species is found in tropical freshwater habitats between 22 and 24 °C (72 and 75 °F). The juveniles are found in marginal habitats, while the adults prefer deep, quiet water between boulders and below overhangs, away from strong currents. They also occur beneath Salvinia mats and in river estuaries in Lake Kariba.

== Description ==
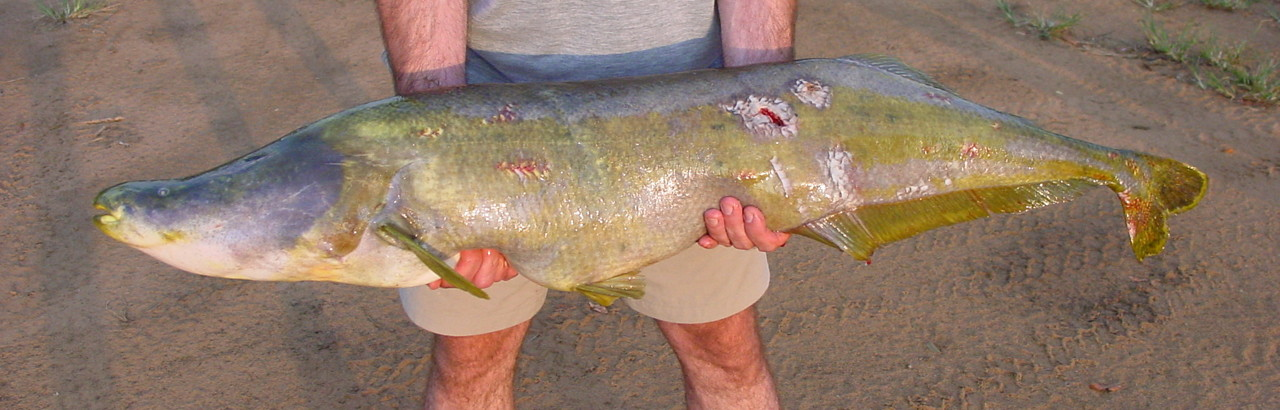
Cornish jack held by field researcher

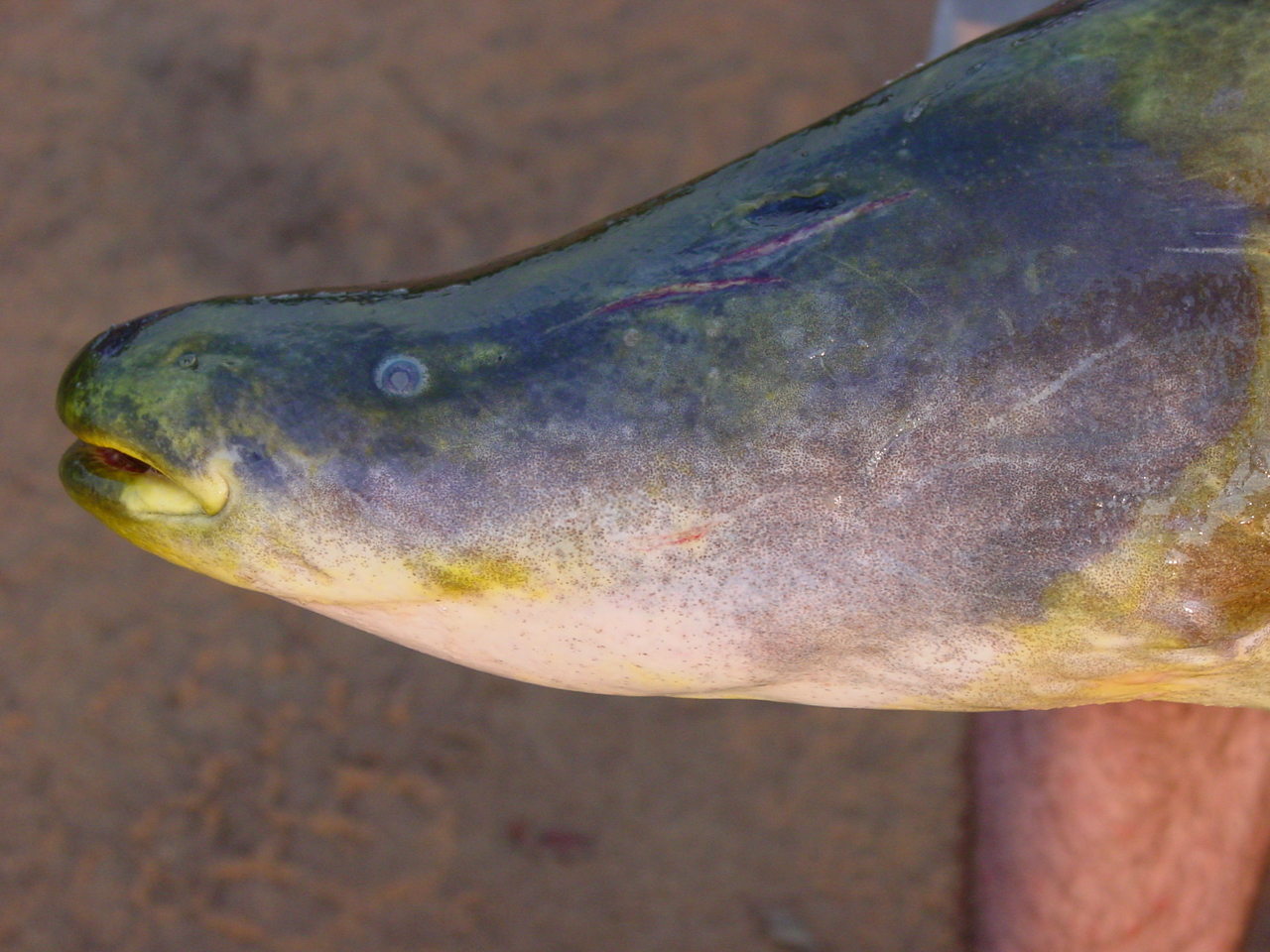
Closeup of head, showing the reduced eyes

The body and head of the Cornish jack are elongated; the head is nearly twice as long as high, smooth and depressed in front. The snout is rounded and almost as wide as the head. The mouth is terminal, with the upper jaw slightly longer than the lower, both bearing a single row of small, pointed teeth. The eyes are very small and placed in the front third of the head. The gill openings are small and inclined at an angle. The dorsal and anal fins are set well back on the body; the caudal fin is relatively small and forked with rounded lobes. There are 21–30 fin rays in the dorsal and 38–51 rays in the anal fin. The anal fin of the male differs from that of the female in having longer rays and a pronounced concavity in the anterior half.

The scales are small, numbering 85–100 in the lateral line. The coloration is gray above, lighter silvery white below, often with a bronze or yellow sheen. The juveniles are darker in color, being grayish blue or brown. The meristic characteristics of the body (such as the number of scales, fin rays, and vertebrae) vary by geographic location. The largest members of the family Mormyridae, Cornish jacks attain a maximum known length of 1.5 m and a weight of 15 kg.

== Biology and ecology ==
Like other mormyrids, Cornish jacks have an electric organ and generate weak pulses of electricity for navigation, finding food, and communication. Electroceptive cells allow it to detect distortions in the electric field surrounding its body, and determine the size, distance, and properties of the causative object.

=== Feeding ===
Adult Cornish jack are primarily piscivorous; along the Bia River, fish in lake environments feed mainly on tilapia (Sarotherodon and Tilapia) with significant seasonal variation in diet, whereas fish in river environments take both fish and crustaceans. The juveniles feed mostly on shrimps and aquatic insect larvae; larger individuals about 17 cm long also take small cichlids, minnows, and labeos. Historically, Cornish jacks have been thought to feed on decomposing matter, as they were known to congregate around human encampments where large amounts of refuse was dumped into the water.

Observations of Cornish jacks in Lake Malawi show that they form relatively stable groups of 2 to 10 individuals. During the day, the group shelters together in caves, and at night they hunt for cichlids together over rocky reefs to a distance of 20 m (66 ft) from their shelter. Occasionally individual fish will temporarily separate from the others after capturing a cichlid. When a potential prey item is detected, the fish will approach to within 1–20 cm (0.39–7.87 in) before stopping and producing regular pulses of electricity at 20–40 millisecond (ms) intervals. This "stationary probing" behavior could allow the Cornish jack to estimate prey size, as they preferentially target smaller cichlids. After a few seconds, a strike may follow, during which the rate of electrical pulses generated may increase to once every 18–20 ms. In many cases, the targeted cichlid showed little movement prior to capture, indicating that they were unaware of the predator's presence.

Group-hunting Cornish jacks capture more prey and make more successful attacks than those hunting alone. However, it is yet unclear what exact advantages are conferred by the group, as the prey items are not shared between individuals and often individuals steal prey from each other. One possibility is that feeding efficiency is increased by multiple predators making strikes on the same prey fish within a short time of each other.

=== Communication ===
Differences in the waveforms of their electrical pulses may allow Cornish jacks to recognize each other individually, and thus maintain the identity of their groups. Cornish jacks in groups will adjust the rate of their electrical pulses so that they occur at 18–20 ms delays relative to each other; this "echo response", common in mormyrids, is especially robust in Cornish jacks and serves to minimize electrical interference between different individuals. Cornish jack hunting groups have also been recorded producing synchronized bursts of electrical pulses lasting 1–2.5 s every few minutes. These bursts have been proposed to be mutual group recognition signals.

=== Reproduction ===
The Cornish jack is oviparous and spawns in summer during the rainy season. In the upper Ogun River, Cornish jacks and other piscivorous fishes are especially abundant at the beginning and middle of the annual flood, suggesting that they migrate upstream to breed and retreat downstream when the water recedes. The females are fractional spawners and may carry 25,000 or more eggs. In the Baoulé River, this species attains maturity at no less than 34.6 cm (13.6 in) long. Their lifespan may be eight or more years.

== Relationship to humans ==
The Cornish jack is a popular species for anglers and is also taken by spearfishermen. Due to their relatively small mouths, the bait used can be a thin filet of fish, worms, or crabs, and they can be taken by light tackle as they are not known for their fighting abilities. The flesh is held in high esteem; the species name of one of its synonyms, Mormyrops deliciosus, reflects this fact. Theodore Gill (1902) noted that it was fished for mostly at dawn and sunset, and that a 5-foot (1.5 m) fish might fetch a price of 25 francs at Boma.
