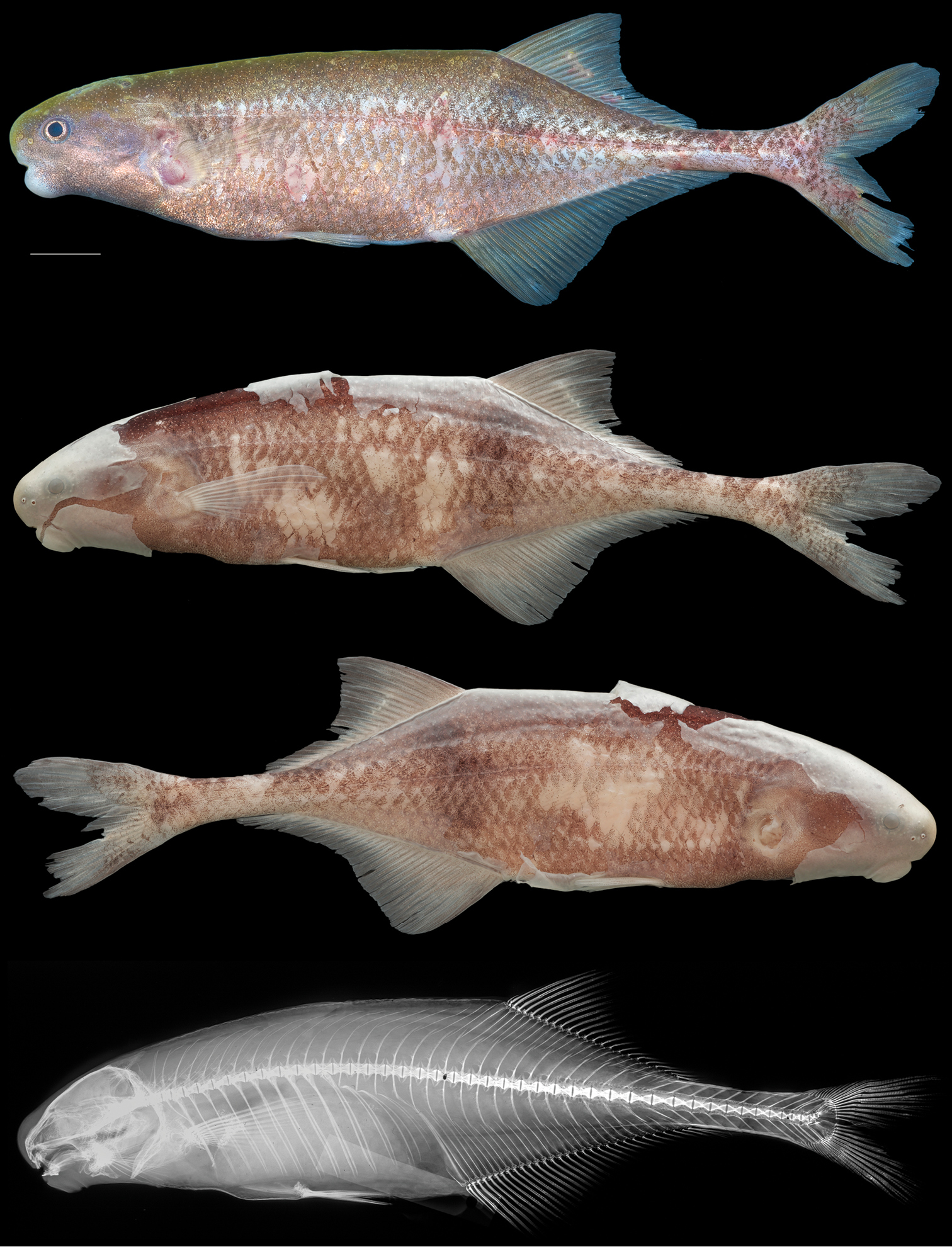
- Cryptomyrus

Scientific classification
- Kingdom: Animalia
- Phylum: Chordata
- Class: Actinopterygii
- Order: Osteoglossiformes
- Family: Mormyridae
- Genus: Cryptomyrus; J. P. Sullivan, Lavoué & C. D. Hopkins, 2016

Type species
- Cryptomyrus ogoouensis Sullivan, Lavoué & Hopkins, 2016

= Cryptomyrus =

Genus of ray-finned fishes

Cryptomyrus is a genus of mormyrid fish native to Gabon.

== Species ==
There are currently two recognized species in this genus:

- Cryptomyrus ogoouensis J. P. Sullivan, Lavoué & C. D. Hopkins, 2016 (Ogooue elephantfish)
- Cryptomyrus ona Sullivan, Lavoué & Hopkins, 2016 (Nyanga elephantfish)
