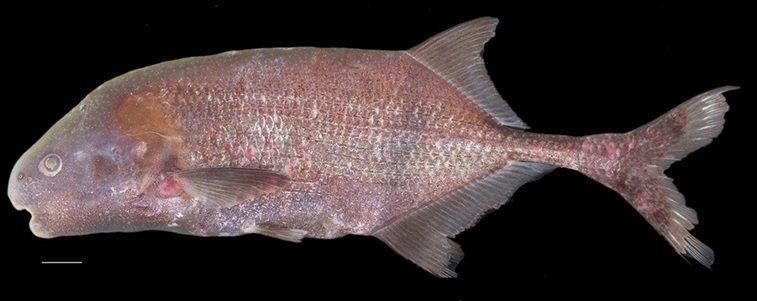

Conservation status
- Vulnerable (IUCN 3.1)

Scientific classification
- Kingdom: Animalia
- Phylum: Chordata
- Class: Actinopterygii
- Order: Osteoglossiformes
- Family: Mormyridae
- Genus: Ivindomyrus
- Species: I. opdenboschi

Binomial name
- Ivindomyrus opdenboschi Taverne & Géry, 1975

= Ivindomyrus opdenboschi =

Species of ray-finned fish

Ivindomyrus opdenboschi is a species of elephantfish in the family Mormyridae. It is only found in the Ivindo River in Gabon. It reaches a length of about 27.4 cm (10.8 in).

== Etymology ==
The fish is named in honor of Armand Opdenbosch (1929–1977), the chief technician and taxidermist at the Musée Royal de I'Afrique Centrale, because of his invaluable technical aid in the study of mormyrid systematics.
