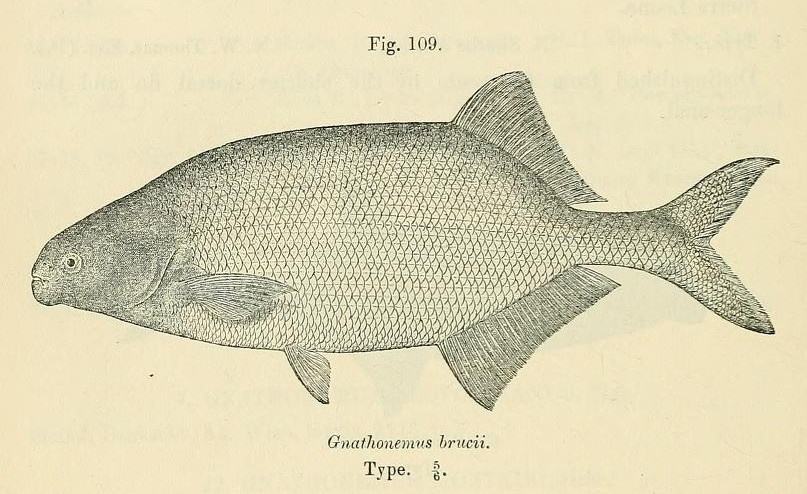
- M. Bruciii

Conservation status
- Vulnerable (IUCN 3.1)

Scientific classification
- Domain: Eukaryota
- Kingdom: Animalia
- Phylum: Chordata
- Class: Actinopterygii
- Order: Osteoglossiformes
- Family: Mormyridae
- Genus: Marcusenius
- Species: M. brucii

Binomial name
- Marcusenius brucii Boulenger, 1910

= Marcusenius brucii =

Species of fish

Marcusenius brucii is a species of electric fish in the family Mormyridae found in the Ogun, Oshun and Mono rivers. It is native to Nigeria and Togo; it can reach a size of approximately 330 mm.

Regarding its conservation status, according to the IUCN, this species can be classified in the "vulnerable (VU)" category.
