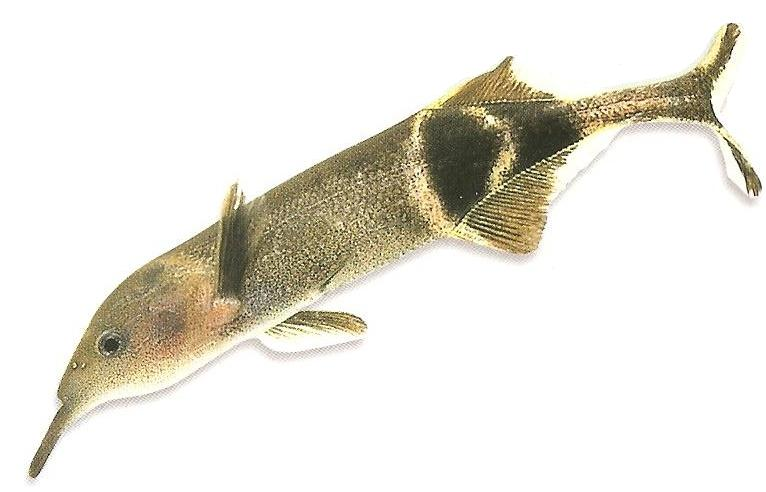
- Elephantnose fish

Conservation status
- Least Concern (IUCN 3.1)

Scientific classification
- Kingdom: Animalia
- Phylum: Chordata
- Class: Actinopterygii
- Division: Teleostei
- Order: Osteoglossiformes
- Family: Mormyridae
- Genus: Gnathonemus
- Species: G. petersii

Binomial name
- Gnathonemus petersii (Günther, 1862)

Synonyms
- Gnathonemus brevicaudatus Pellegrin, 1919; Mormyrus petersii Günther, 1862

= Peters's elephantnose fish =

Species of fish

Peters's elephant-nose fish (Gnathonemus petersii) is an African freshwater elephantfish in the genus Gnathonemus. Other names in English include elephantnose fish, long-nosed elephant fish, and Ubangi mormyrid, after the Ubangi River. The Latin name petersii is probably for the German naturalist Wilhelm Peters. The fish uses electrolocation to find prey, and has the largest brain-to-body oxygen use ratio of all known vertebrates (around 0.6).

== Description ==
Peters's elephantnose fish is native to the rivers of West and Central Africa, in particular the lower Niger River basin, the Ogun River basin and the upper Chari River. It prefers muddy, slowly moving rivers and pools with cover such as submerged branches. The fish is a dark brown to black in colour, laterally compressed (averaging 23–25 cm (9.1–9.8 in)), with a rear dorsal fin and anal fin of the same length. Its caudal or tail fin is forked. It has two stripes on its lower pendicular. Its most striking feature, as its names suggest, is a trunk-like protrusion on the head. This is not actually a nose, but a sensitive extension of the mouth, that it uses for self-defense, communication, navigation, and finding worms and insects to eat. This organ, called the Schnauzenorgan, is covered in electroreceptors, as is much of the rest of its body. The elephantnose uses a weak electric field, which it generates with specialized cells called electrocytes, which evolved from muscle cells, to find food, to navigate in dark or turbid waters, and to find a mate. Peters's elephantnose fish live to about 6–10 years.

== Electrolocation ==
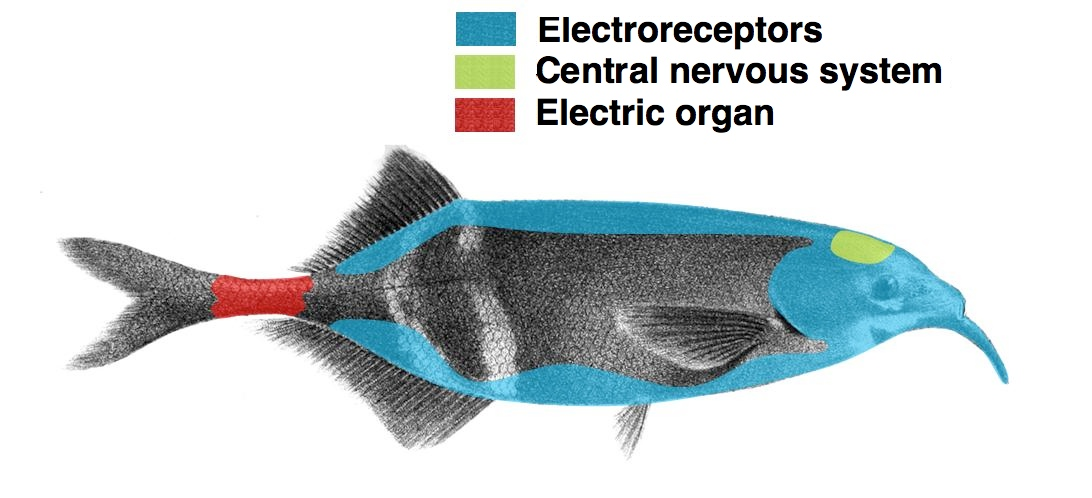
The elephantnose fish is a weakly electric fish which generates an electric field with its electric organ and then processes the returns from its electroreceptors to locate nearby objects.

The elephant nose fish is weakly electric, meaning that it can detect moving prey and worms in the substrate by generating brief electric pulses with the electric organ in its tail. The electroreceptors around its body are sensitive enough to detect the different distortions of the electric field made by objects that conduct or resist electricity. The weak electric fields generated by this fish can be made audible by placing two electrodes in the fish tank, connected to an audio amplifier or a piezoelectric earbud.

== In the aquarium ==
In captivity

Peters's elephantnose fish is one of the most commonly available freshwater elephantfish in aquarium stores in the United States. In the aquarium it is timid, preferring a heavily planted environment with subdued lighting, and thrives in a tank of more than 200 litres (44 imp gal; 53 US gal); favourable additions to the fish's aquarium environment are a pipe or hollow log, alongside soft, sandy substrate, allowing the fish to sift through it with its delicate extended lip.

The fish feeds on small worms (bloodworms being the most common) and aquatic invertebrates such as mosquito larvae, but will accept frozen or flake food. Elephantnose fish are typically kept in water of medium hardness with a pH of 6.8 to 7.2 and a temperature of between 26–28 °C (79–82 °F).

Elephantnose fish, though typically docile when kept in captivity, can be aggressive towards other species of fish, though some fare well in community aquarium environments. However, unless kept in an aquarium of over 400 L (88 imp gal; 110 US gal), elephantnose fish are aggressively territorial towards members of their own species. For this reason owners have been recommended not to keep more than one in captivity.

The elephantnose fish has good low light vision. Its eyes use a combination of photonic crystals, parabolic mirrors and a clustered arrangement of rods and cones.

The species has never been bred in captivity, meaning that all aquarium available specimens are wild-caught. This requires the owner to maintain specific water parameters if the fish is to thrive.

== See also ==
- List of freshwater aquarium fish species
- Medjed (fish)
