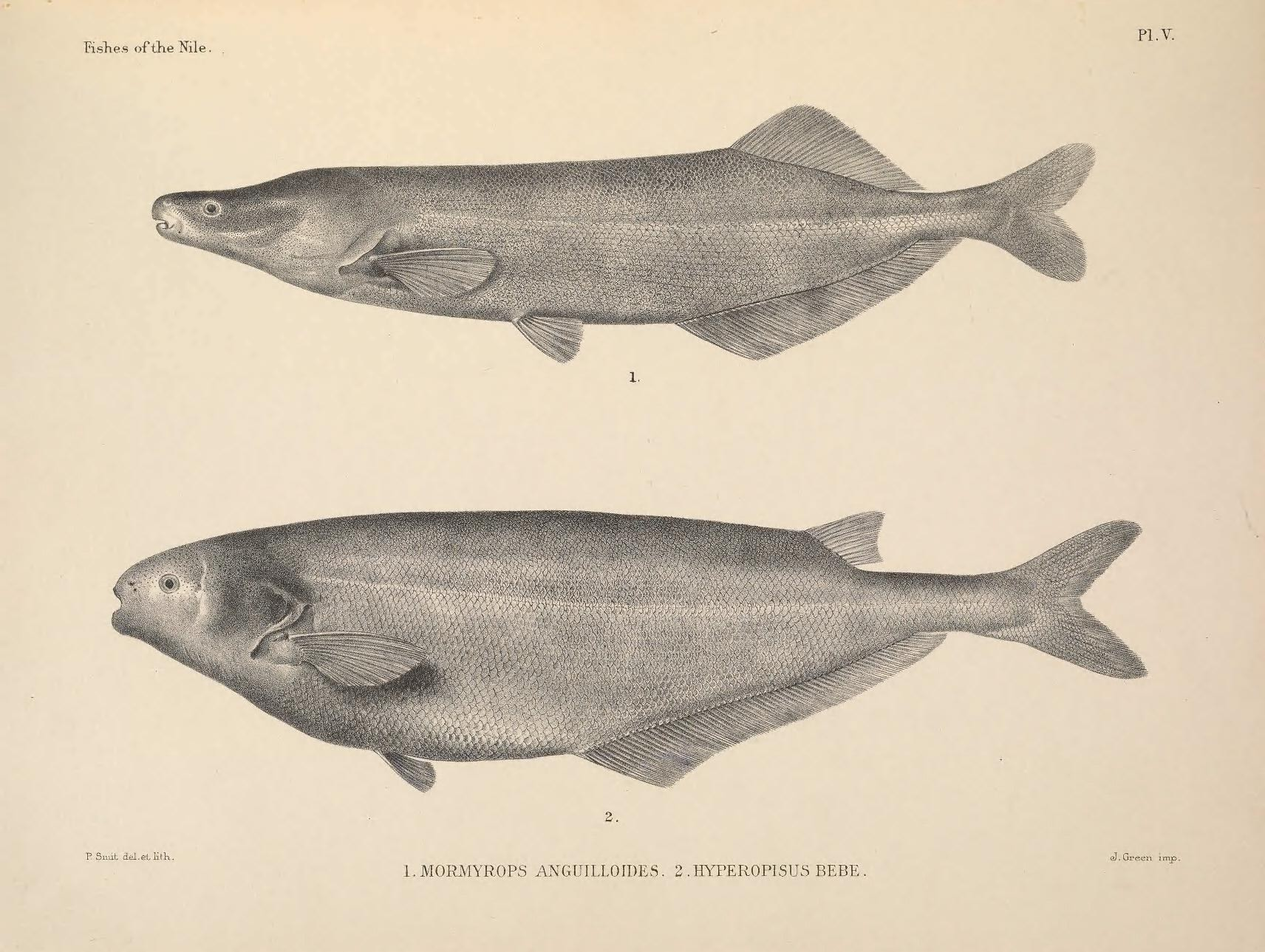
- Hyperopisus bebe (below), Mormyrops anguilloides (above)

Conservation status
- Least Concern (IUCN 3.1)

Scientific classification
- Kingdom: Animalia
- Phylum: Chordata
- Class: Actinopterygii
- Order: Osteoglossiformes
- Family: Mormyridae
- Genus: Hyperopisus; T. N. Gill, 1862
- Species: H. bebe

Binomial name
- Hyperopisus bebe (Lacépède, 1803): Phagrus Marcusen 1864; Mormyrus bebe Lacepède 1803; Hyperopisus occidentalis Günther 1866; Hyperopisus tenuicauda Pellégrin 1904; Hyperopisus occidentalis tenuicaudus (Pellégrin 1904); Hyperopisus bebe chariensis Blache 1964; Hyperopisus chariensis (Blache 1964); Mormyrus dorsalis Geoffroy Saint-Hilaire 1809; Phagrus dorsalis (Geoffroy Saint-Hilaire 1809)

= Hyperopisus =

Genus of ray-finned fishes

Hyperopisus is a monospecific genus of freshwater ray-finned fish belonging to the family Mormyridae, the elephantfishes. The only species in the genus is Hyperopisus bebe. This species is known from many rivers in the northern half of Africa, ranging from the Senegal to the Nile basin. It reaches a length of 51 cm (20 in).

== Biology ==
The Bebe morymid inhabits both still and flowing bodies of water. The species' diet consists mainly of mollusks. It possesses electroreceptors over its head and on the ventral and dorsal regions of the body, but they are absent from the side and the caudal peduncle where the electric organ is located.

== Subspecies ==
- Hyperopisus bebe bebe (Lacépède 1803)
- Hyperopisus bebe occidentalis Günther 1866
