= Medjed (fish) =

Species of fish

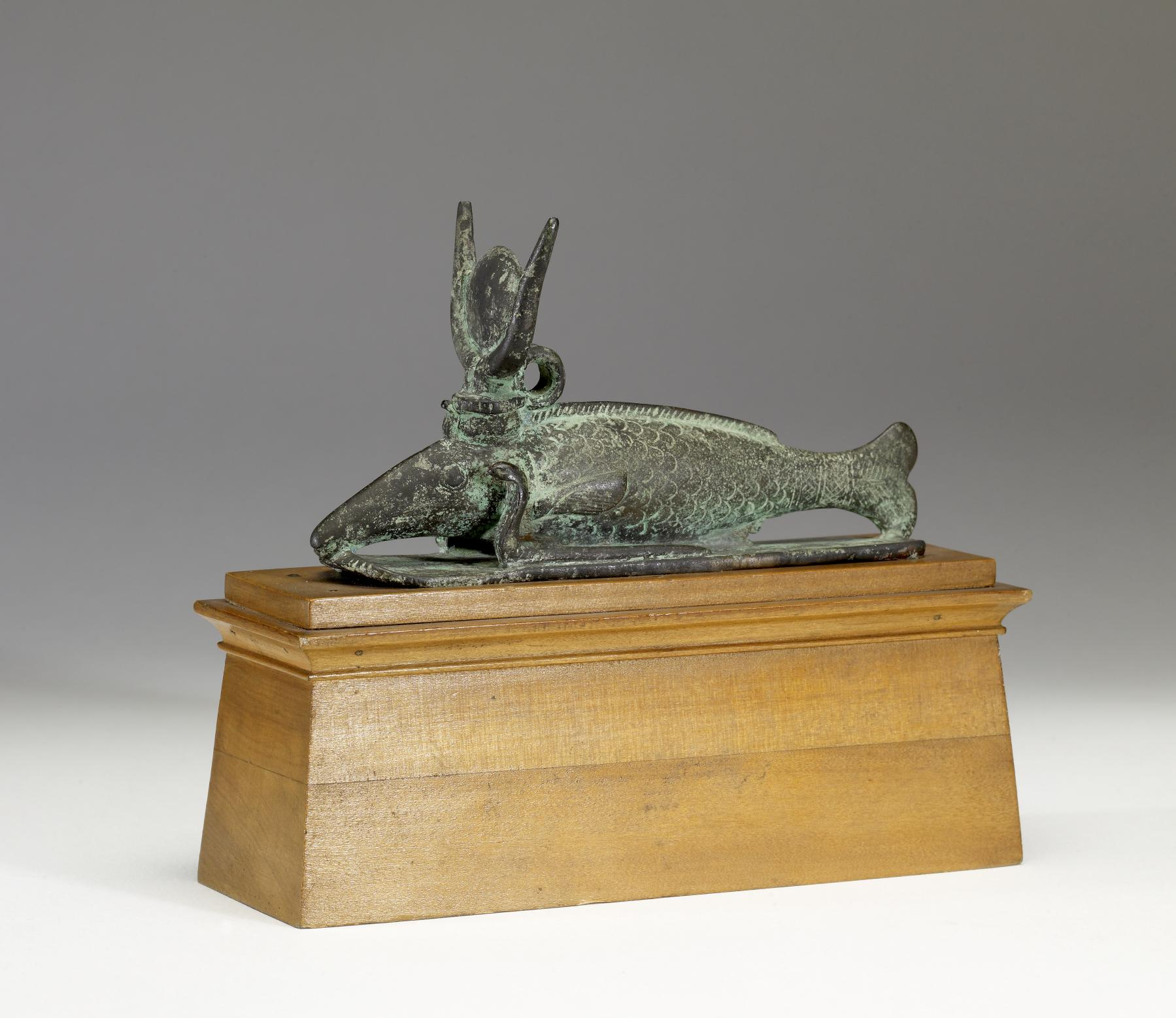
- Bronze figurine of an Oxyrhynchus fish, wearing a horned sun-disc. Late Period–Ptolemaic
- Major cult center: Oxyrynchus
- Symbol: Elephantfish

Medjed were a kind of elephantfish worshipped at Oxyrhynchus (Gr. Ὀξύρρυγχος) in ancient Egyptian religion.

The fish were believed to have eaten the penis of the god Osiris after his brother Set had dismembered and scattered his body. A settlement in Upper Egypt, Per-Medjed, was named after them. They are now better known by their Greek name Oxyrhynchus, meaning "sharp-nosed", a nod to the Egyptian depiction of the fish. As a sacred fish, they are frequently depicted wearing horned sun-discs. Some figurines have rings to enable their wear as pendant amulets.

Freshwater elephantfish (subfamily Mormyrinae) are medium-sized freshwater fish abundant in the Nile. Some of the species have distinctive downturned snouts, lending them their common name. The Oxyrhynchus fish depicted as bronze figurines, mural paintings, or wooden coffins in the shape of fish with downturned snouts, with horned sun-disc crowns like those of the goddess Hathor, have been described as resembling members of the genus Mormyrus.
