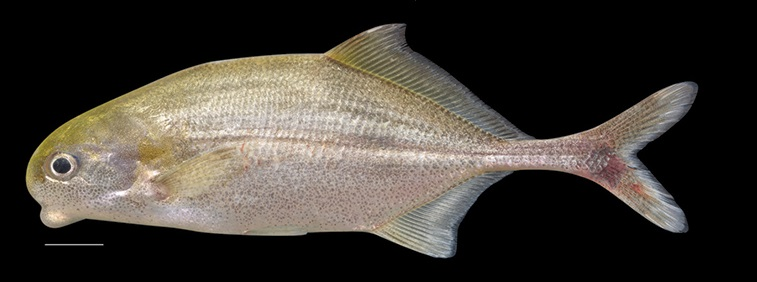
- Cyphomyrus psittacus

Scientific classification
- Kingdom: Animalia
- Phylum: Chordata
- Class: Actinopterygii
- Order: Osteoglossiformes
- Family: Mormyridae
- Genus: Cyphomyrus; Myers, 1960

Type species
- Mormyrus psittacus Boulenger, 1897

= Cyphomyrus =

Genus of ray-finned fishes

Cyphomyrus is a genus of ray-finned fish in the family Mormyridae, the freshwater elephantfishes.

== Species ==
The following 9 species are currently assigned to this genus:

- Cyphomyrus aelsbroecki (Poll, 1945)
- Cyphomyrus cubangoensis (Pellegrin, 1936)
- Cyphomyrus discorhynchus (Peters, 1852) (Zambezi parrotfish)
- Cyphomyrus grahami (Norman 1928) (Graham's stonebasher)
- Cyphomyrus lufirae Mulelenu et al., 2020
- Cyphomyrus macrops (Boulenger, 1909)
- Cyphomyrus psittacus (Boulenger, 1897)
- Cyphotamyrus weeksii ([Boulenger, 1902) (Weeks' mormyrid)
- Cyphomyrus wilverthi (Boulenger, 1898)
