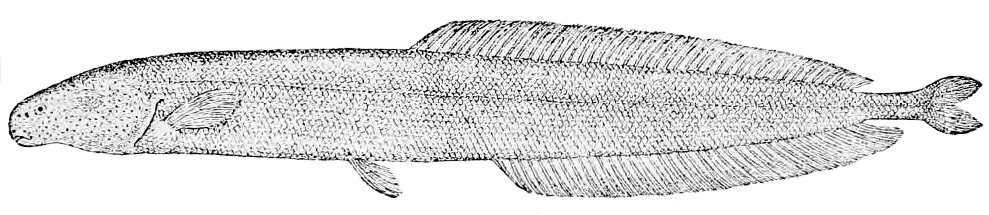

Conservation status
- Least Concern (IUCN 3.1)

Scientific classification
- Kingdom: Animalia
- Phylum: Chordata
- Class: Actinopterygii
- Order: Osteoglossiformes
- Family: Mormyridae
- Genus: Isichthys; T. N. Gill, 1863
- Species: I. henryi

Binomial name
- Isichthys henryi T. N. Gill, 1863

Synonyms
- Mormyrus henryi (Gill, 1863); Mormyrus cobitiformis Peters, 1882

= Isichthys =

Genus of ray-finned fishes

Isischthys is a monospecific genus of freshwater ray-finned fish belonging to the family Mormyridae, the elephantfishes. The only species in the genus is Isichthys henryi. It occurs in coastal river basins in West Africa, ranging as far southeast as the Kouilou-Niari River in Middle Africa. It reaches a length of about 29 cm (11 in).

== Etymology ==
The fish is named in honor of Joseph Henry (1797–1878), first Secretary of the Smithsonian Institution in Washington, D.C.
