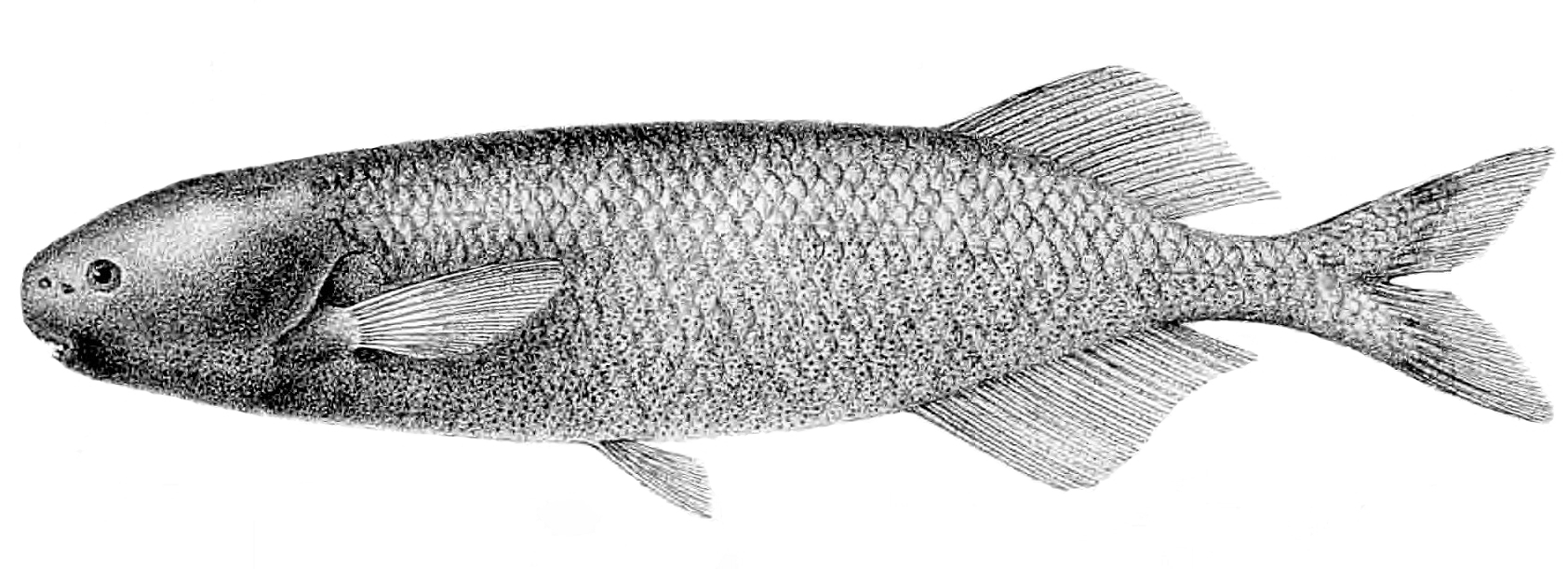
- Paramormyrops kingsleyae

Scientific classification
- Kingdom: Animalia
- Phylum: Chordata
- Class: Actinopterygii
- Order: Osteoglossiformes
- Family: Mormyridae
- Genus: Paramormyrops; Taverne, Thys van den Audenaerde & Heymer, 1977

Type species
- Paramormyrops gabonensis Taverne, Thys van den Audenaerde & Heymer, 1977

= Paramormyrops =

Genus of ray-finned fishes

Paramormyrops is a genus of elephantfish in the family Mormyridae from Africa.

== Species ==
There are currently 11 recognized species in this genus:

- Paramormyrops batesii (Boulenger 1906) (Kribi mormyrid)
- Paramormyrops curvifrons (Taverne, Thys van den Audenaerde, Heymer & Géry, 1977) (Ivindo mormyrid)
- Paramormyrops gabonensis Taverne, Thys van den Audenaerde & Heymer, 1977 (Makokou mormyrid)
- Paramormyrops hopkinsi (Taverne & Thys van den Audenaerde, 1985) (Ivindo electric fish)
- Paramormyrops jacksoni (Poll, 1967) (Ghost stonebasher)
- Paramormyrops kingsleyae (Günther, 1896) (Old Calabar mormyrid)
- Paramormyrops longicaudatus (Taverne, Thys van den Audenaerde, Heymer & Géry, 1977) (longtailed mormyrid)
- Paramormyrops ntotom Rich, J. P. Sullivan & Hopkins, 2017 (Doume elephantfish)
- Paramormyrops retrodorsalis (Nichols & Griscom, 1917) (Bima elephantfish)
- Paramormyrops sphekodes (Sauvage 1879)
