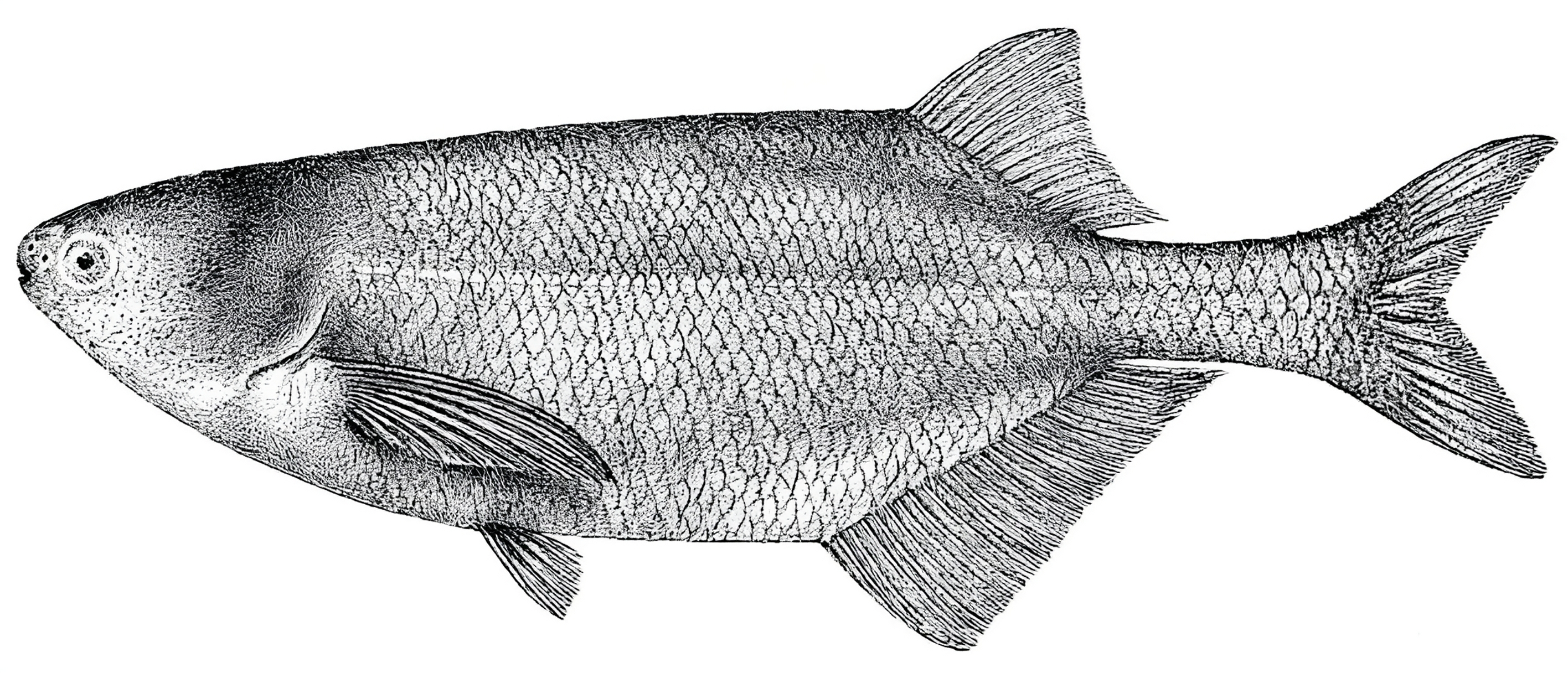
- Brevimyrus niger

Conservation status
- Least Concern (IUCN 3.1)

Scientific classification
- Kingdom: Animalia
- Phylum: Chordata
- Class: Actinopterygii
- Order: Osteoglossiformes
- Family: Mormyridae
- Genus: Brevimyrus; Taverne, 1971
- Species: B. niger

Binomial name
- Brevimyrus niger (Günther, 1866)

Synonyms
- Mormyrus niger Günther, 1866; Brienomyrus niger (Günther, 1866); Gnathonemus niger (Günther, 1866); Mormyrus lhuysi Steindachner, 1870; Marcusenius lhuysi (Steindachner, 1870); Pollimyrus lhuysi (Steindachner, 1870); Gnathonemus baudoni Pellegrin, 1919; Marcusenius macularius Fowler, 1936

= Brevimyrus =

Genus of ray-finned fishes

Brevimyrus is a monospecific genus of freshwater ray-finned fish belonging to the family Mormyridae, the elephantfishes. The only species in the genus is Brevimyrus niger which is found in the larger drainage systems of the Sahel and Sudanese savanna including the Senegal, Gambia, Niger, Volta, Ouémé and Chad, it is also known from White Nile.
