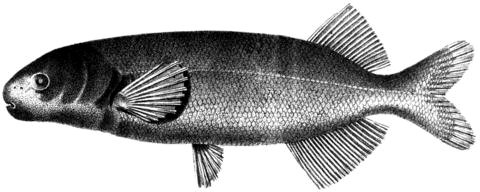
- Heteromormyrus pauciradiatus

Scientific classification
- Kingdom: Animalia
- Phylum: Chordata
- Class: Actinopterygii
- Order: Osteoglossiformes
- Family: Mormyridae
- Genus: Heteromormyrus; Steindachner, 1866

Type species
- Mormyrus pauciradiatus Steindachner, 1866

Species
- see text

= Heteromormyrus =

Genus of ray-finned fishes

Heteromormyrus is a genus of freshwater ray-finned fishes belonging to the family Mormyridae, the elephantfishes. These fishes are found in southern and central Africa in Angola, Namibia, the Democratic Republic of the Congo and, maybe, Zimbabwe.

== Species ==
Heteromormyrus contains the following recognised species:

- Heteromormyrus ansorgii (Boulenger, 1905) (Slender stonebasher)
- Heteromormyrus longilateralis (B. Kramer & E. R. Swartz, 2010) (Cubnene river stonebasher)
- Heteromormyrus pappenheimi (Boulenger 1910) (Pappenheim's stonebasher)
- Heteromormyrus pauciradiatus (Steindachner, 1866) (Steindachner's Angolan mormyrid or Steindachner's mormyrid)
- Heteromormyrus szaboi (B. Kramer, van der Bank & Wink, 2004)
- Heteromormyrus tavernei (Poll, 1972) (Upper Zambezi mormyrid)
