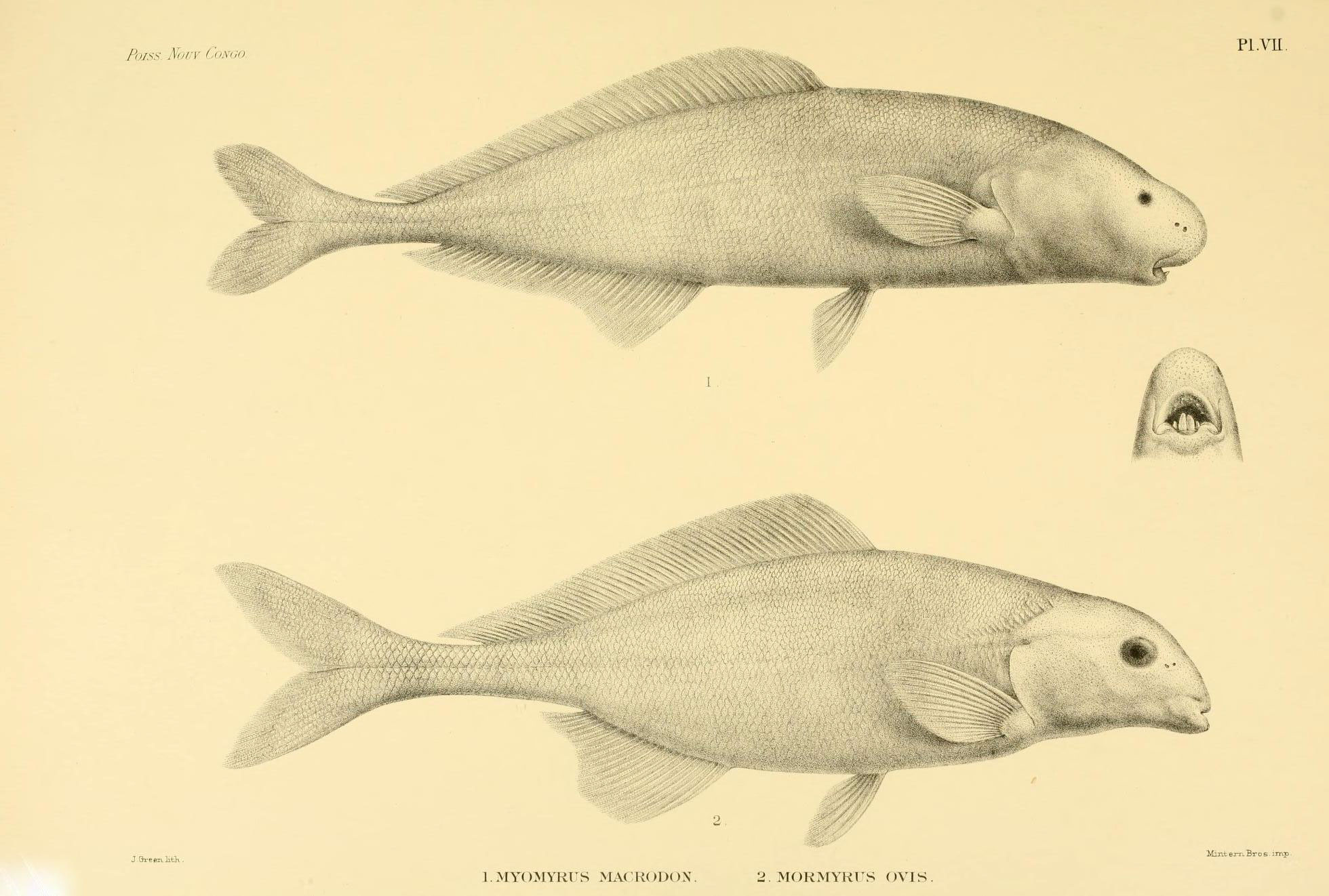
- Myomyrus macrodon (above), Mormyrus ovis (below)

Scientific classification
- Kingdom: Animalia
- Phylum: Chordata
- Class: Actinopterygii
- Order: Osteoglossiformes
- Family: Mormyridae
- Genus: Myomyrus; Boulenger, 1898

Type species
- Myomyrus macrodon Boulenger, 1898

= Myomyrus =

Genus of ray-finned fishes

Myomyrus is a genus of elephantfish in the family Mormyridae. Its members reach about 25–30 cm (10–12 in) in length and are restricted to the Congo River Basin in Africa.

== Species ==
There are three recognized species in this genus:

- Myomyrus macrodon Boulenger, 1898 (Matadi mormyrid)
- Myomyrus macrops Boulenger, 1914 (Ja River mormyrid)
- Myomyrus pharao (Poll & Taverne, 1967) (Kinsuka mormyrid)
