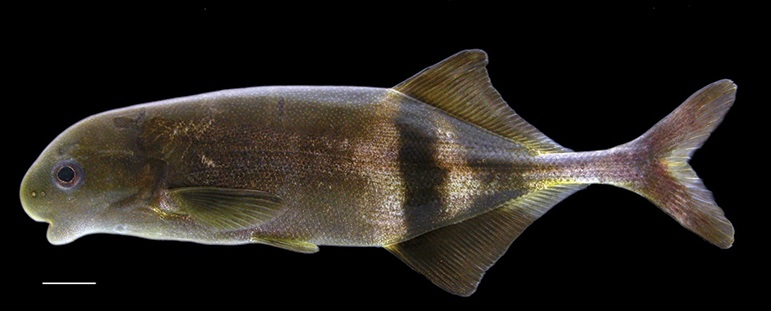
- Hippopotamyrus castor

Scientific classification
- Kingdom: Animalia
- Phylum: Chordata
- Class: Actinopterygii
- Order: Osteoglossiformes
- Family: Mormyridae
- Genus: Hippopotamyrus; Pappenheim, 1906

Type species
- Hippopotamyrus castor Pappenheim, 1906

Species
- See text

Synonyms
- Paramyomyrus Pellégrin 1927

= Hippopotamyrus =

Genus of ray-finned fishes

Hippopotamyrus is a genus of ray-finned fish in the family Mormyridae, the freshwater elephantfishes. These fishes are found in Africa.

== Species ==
There are currently 3 recognized species in this genus:

- Hippopotamyrus castor Pappenheim 1906 (Lokundi mormyrid)
- Hippopotamyrus paugyi Lévêque & Bigorne 1985 (Kolente stonebasher)
- Hippopotamyrus pictus (Marcusen 1864) (Marcusen's mormyrid)
