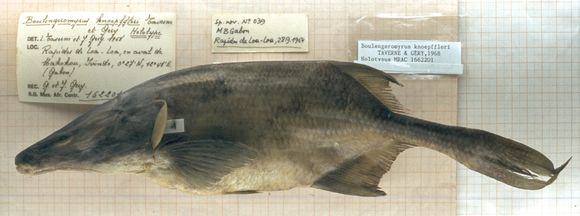

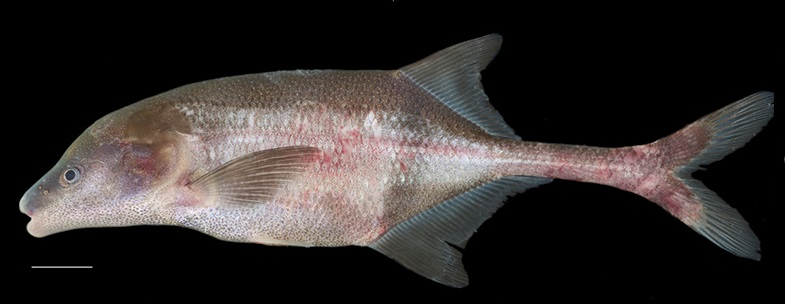
- Adult above, juvenile below

Scientific classification
- Kingdom: Animalia
- Phylum: Chordata
- Class: Actinopterygii
- Order: Osteoglossiformes
- Family: Mormyridae
- Genus: Boulengeromyrus; Taverne & Géry, 1968
- Species: B. knoepffleri

Binomial name
- Boulengeromyrus knoepffleri Taverne & Géry, 1968

= Boulengeromyrus =

Genus of ray-finned fishes

Boulengeromyrus is a monospecific genus of freshwater ray-finned fish belonging to the family Mormyridae, the elephantfishes. The only species in the genus is Knoepffler's elephantfish (Boulengeromyrus knoepffleri). It occurs only in the Ivindo River and the Ntem River basins of Gabon and Cameroon. It reaches a maximum length of about 41 cm (16 in).

== Etymology ==
The genus name is in honor of Belgian-born British ichthyologist-herpetologist George A. Boulenger (1858–1937), of the British Museum (Natural History), who described 70 currently valid species of mormyrids; –myrus, conventional termination for generic names of elephantfishes, abridgement of Mormyrus, type genus of family.

The species name is in honor of Louis-Philippe Knoepffler (1926–1984), for his contributions to the herpetology and the ichthyology of Gabon.
