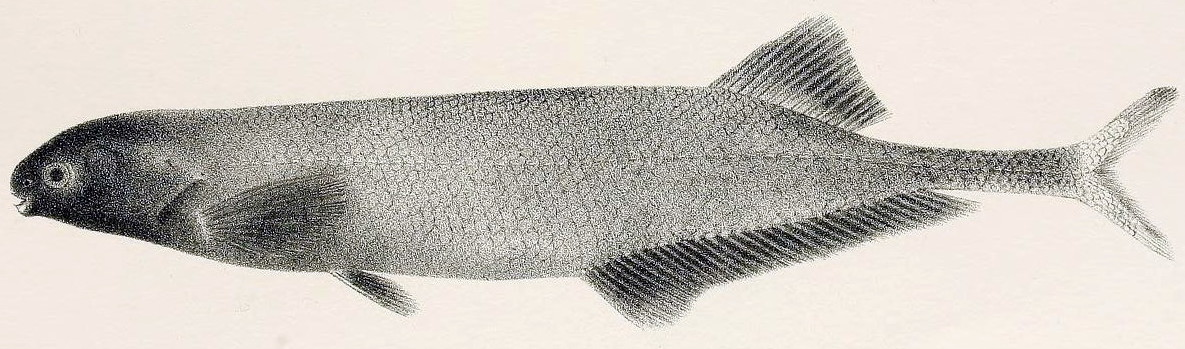
- Brienomyrus longianalis

Scientific classification
- Kingdom: Animalia
- Phylum: Chordata
- Class: Actinopterygii
- Order: Osteoglossiformes
- Family: Mormyridae
- Genus: Brienomyrus; Taverne, 1971

Type species
- Marcusenius brachyistius T. N. Gill, 1862

= Brienomyrus =

Genus of ray-finned fishes

Brienomyrus is a genus of small elephantfish in the family Mormyridae from Africa. Usually available in the pet trade, these fish are commercially referred to as baby whales or baby whalefish.

== Species ==
There are currently three recognized species in this genus:

- Brienomyrus adustus (Fowler 1936)
- Brienomyrus brachyistius (T. N. Gill 1862) (baby whale fish, baby whale mormyrid)
- Brienomyrus longianalis (Boulenger 1901)
