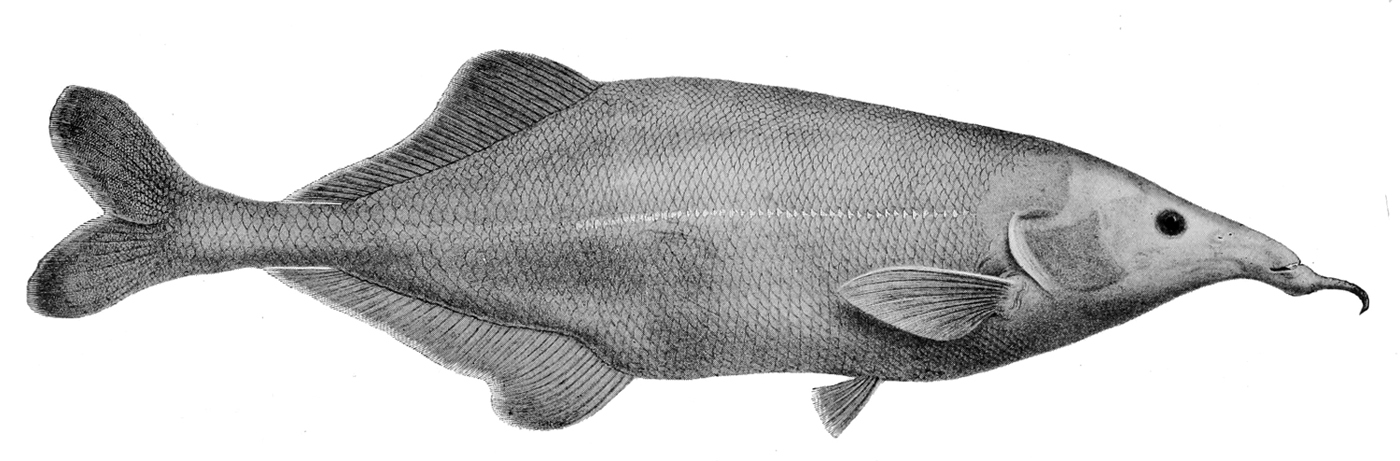

Conservation status
- Least Concern (IUCN 3.1)

Scientific classification
- Kingdom: Animalia
- Phylum: Chordata
- Class: Actinopterygii
- Order: Osteoglossiformes
- Family: Mormyridae
- Genus: Genyomyrus; Boulenger, 1898
- Species: G. donnyi

Binomial name
- Genyomyrus donnyi Boulenger, 1898

= Genyomyrus =

Genus of ray-finned fishes

Genyomyrus is a monospecific genus of freshwater fish belonging to the family Mormyridae, the elephantfishes. The only species in the genus is Genyomyrus donnyi which is endemic to the Congo River. It reaches a length of about 45 cm (1.5 ft).

== Etymology ==
The fish is named in honor of Gen. Albert-Ernest Donny (1841–1923), the president of the Société d'Études Coloniales, which sponsored the first major collection of fishes from the Congo.
