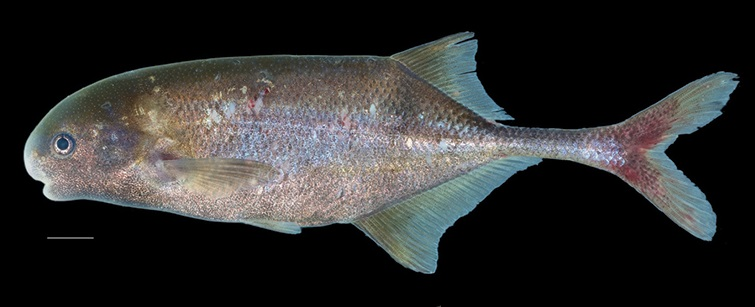
- Ivindomyrus marchei

Scientific classification
- Kingdom: Animalia
- Phylum: Chordata
- Class: Actinopterygii
- Division: Teleostei
- Order: Osteoglossiformes
- Family: Mormyridae
- Genus: Ivindomyrus; Taverne & Géry, 1975

Type species
- Ivindomyrus opdenboschi Taverne & Géry, 1975

= Ivindomyrus =

Genus of ray-finned fishes

Ivindomyrus is a genus of freshwater ray-finned fish belonging to the family Mormyridae, the elephantfishes. These fishes are found in rivers in Middle Africa.

== Species ==
There are currently two recognized species in this genus:

- Ivindomyrus marchei (Sauvage 1879) (Ogooue mormyrid)
- Ivindomyrus opdenboschi Taverne & Géry, 1975 (Ivindo mormyrid)
