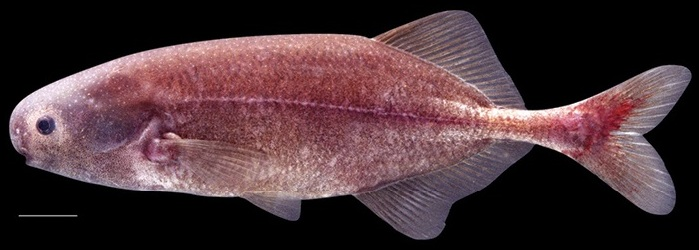
- Stomatorhinus walkeri

Scientific classification
- Kingdom: Animalia
- Phylum: Chordata
- Class: Actinopterygii
- Division: Teleostei
- Order: Osteoglossiformes
- Family: Mormyridae
- Genus: Stomatorhinus; Boulenger, 1898

Type species
- Mormyrus walkeri Günther, 1867

= Stomatorhinus =

Genus of ray-finned fishes

Stomatorhinus is a genus of small elephantfish in the family Mormyridae.

== Species ==
There are currently 13 recognized species in this genus:

- Stomatorhinus ater Pellegrin, 1924 (Kidada mormyrid)
- Stomatorhinus corneti Boulenger, 1899 (Stanley Pool mormyrid)
- Stomatorhinus fuliginosus Poll, 1941 (Mosongolia mormyrid)
- Stomatorhinus humilior Boulenger, 1899 (Ibali mormyrid)
- Stomatorhinus ivindoensis Sullivan & Hopkins, 2005 (Biale Creek mormyrid)
- Stomatorhinus kununguensis Poll, 1945 (Kunungu mormyrid)
- Stomatorhinus microps Boulenger, 1898 (Boma mormyrid)
- Stomatorhinus patrizii Vinciguerra, 1928 (Buta mormyrid)
- Stomatorhinus polli Matthes, 1964 (Ikela mormyrid)
- Stomatorhinus polylepis Boulenger, 1899 (Isangila mormyrid)
- Stomatorhinus puncticulatus Boulenger, 1899 (Chiloango mormyrid)
- Stomatorhinus schoutedeni , Poll, 1945 (Schouteden's mormyrid)
- Stomatorhinus walkeri (Günther, 1867) (Walker mormyrid)
