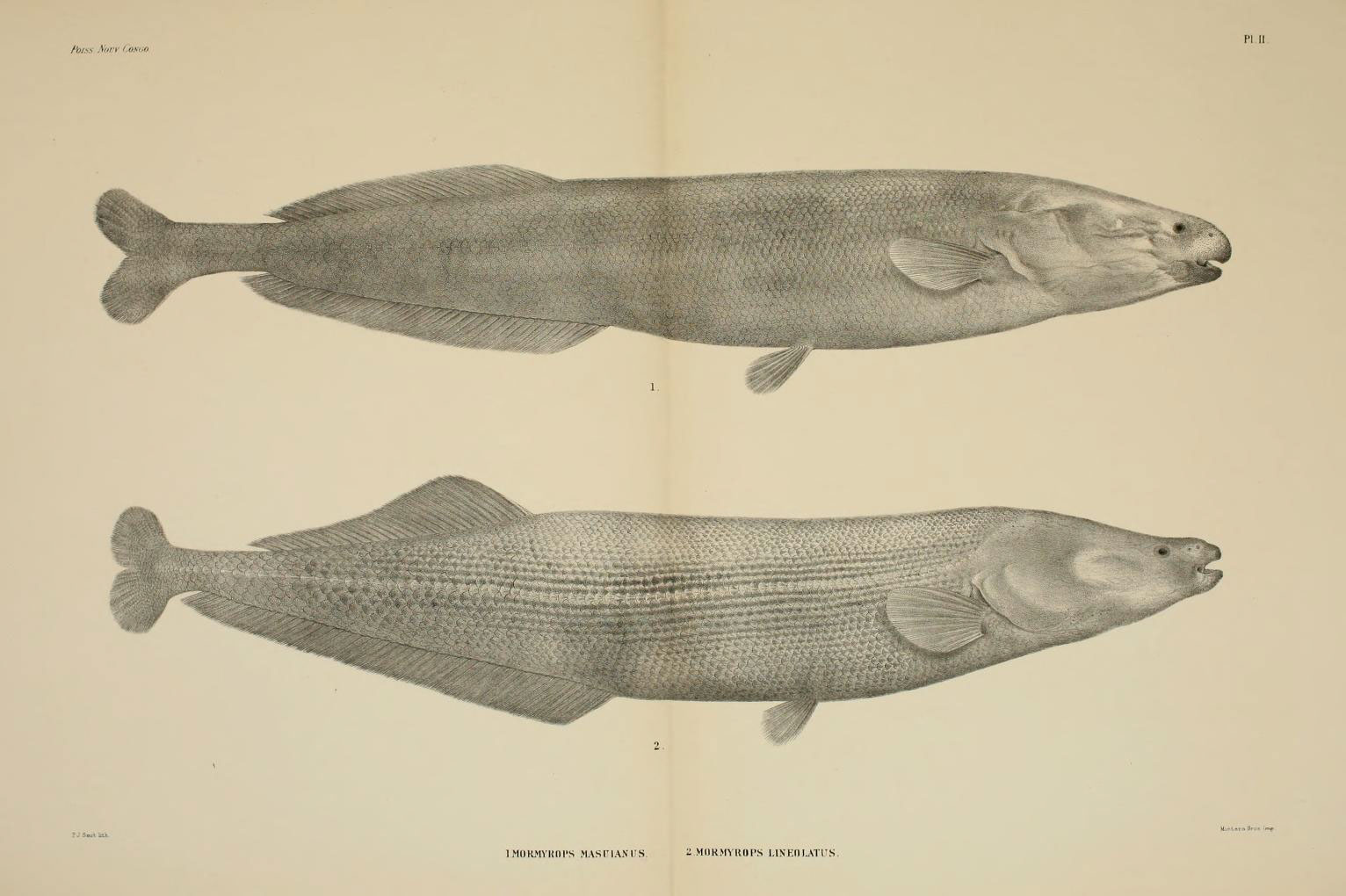
- Mormyrops masuianus (above), Mormyrops lineolatus (below)

Scientific classification
- Kingdom: Animalia
- Phylum: Chordata
- Class: Actinopterygii
- Order: Osteoglossiformes
- Family: Mormyridae
- Genus: Mormyrops; J. P. Müller, 1843

Synonyms
- Oxyrhynchus Leach 1818 non de Blainville 1926 non Brandegee

= Mormyrops =

Genus of ray-finned fishes

Mormyrops is a genus of weakly electric fish in the family Mormyridae from freshwater in Africa. They are characterized by an elongate head measuring twice as long as high, and no teeth on the palate or the tongue. The genus includes the largest member of the mormyrid family, the cornish jack (Mormyrops anguilloides) at up to 1.5 m (4.9 ft) in length.

== Taxonomy and species ==
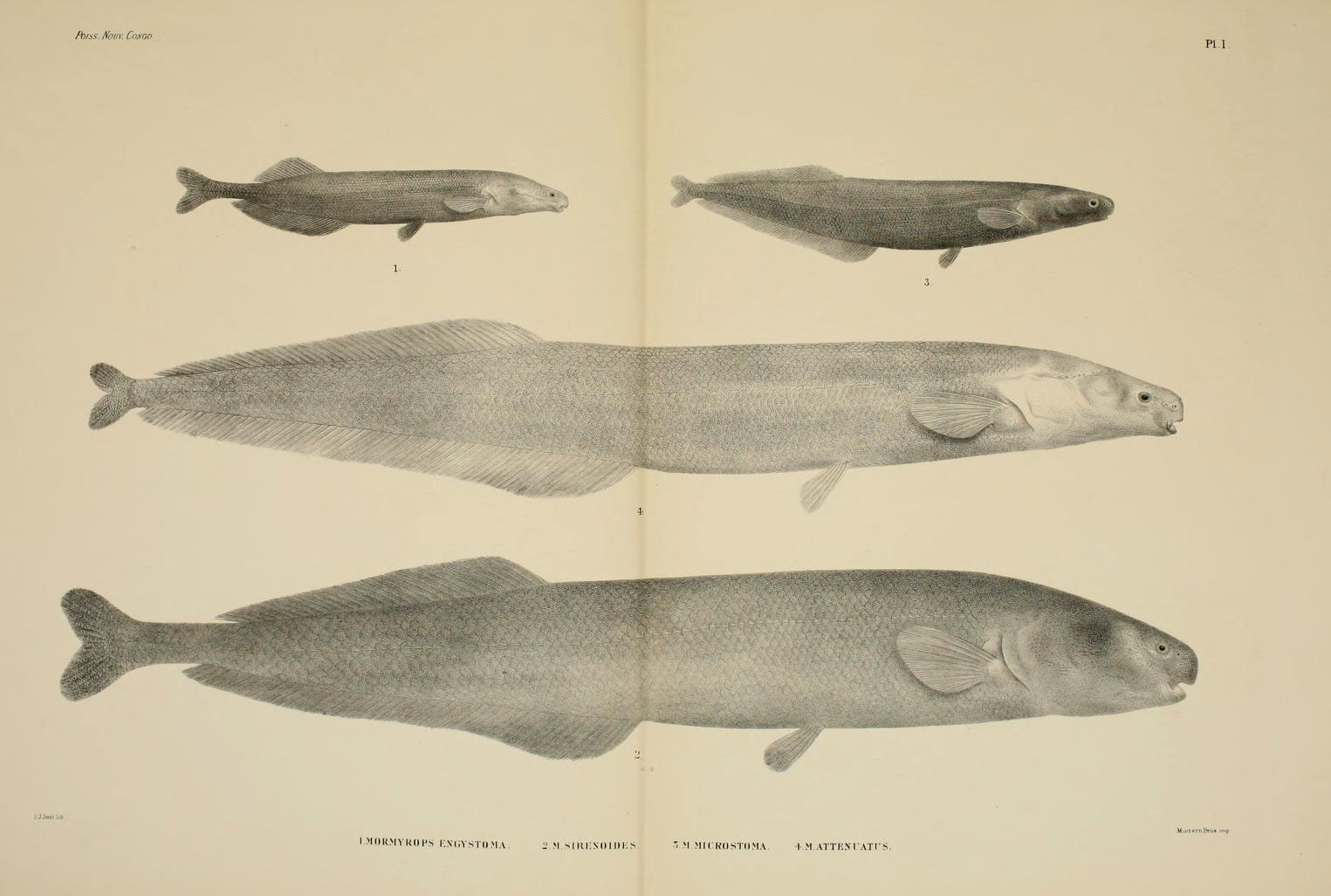
M. engystoma (top left), M. microstoma (top right), M. attenuatus (middle), M. sirenoides (bottom)

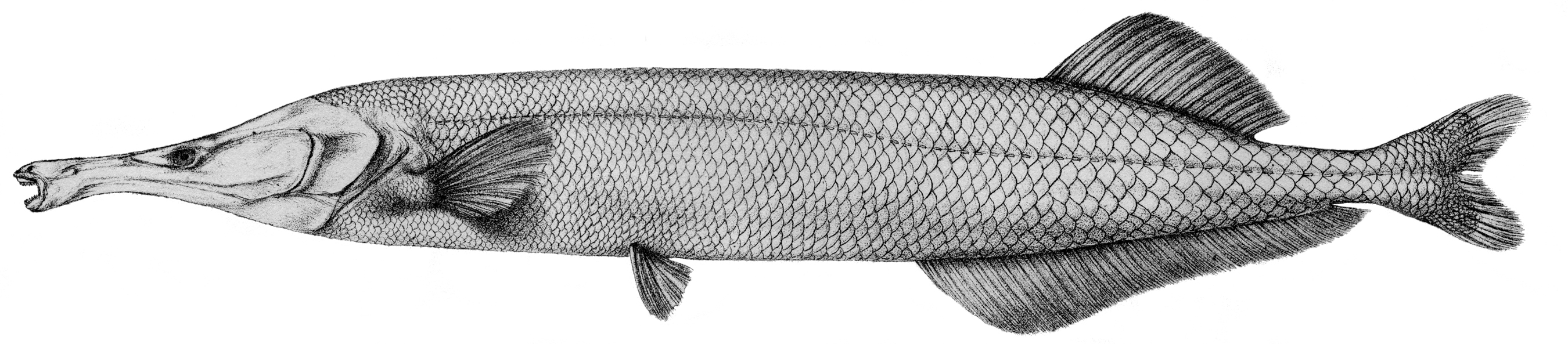
Two long-nosed species, M. zanclirostris (shown) and M. boulengeri, are sometimes placed in their own genus Oxymormyrus instead

According to FishBase, there are currently 21 recognized species in this genus.

- Mormyrops anguilloides (Linnaeus, 1758) (Cornish jack)
- Mormyrops attenuatus Boulenger, 1898 (Upoto mormyrid)
- Mormyrops batesianus Boulenger, 1909 (Bumba mormyrid)
- Mormyrops breviceps Steindachner, 1894 (Liberian elephantfish)
- Mormyrops caballus Pellegrin, 1927 (Sanaga mormyrid)
- Mormyrops citernii Vinciguerra, 1912 (Genale mormyrid)
- Mormyrops curtus Boulenger, 1899 (Boma mormyrid)
- Mormyrops curviceps Román, 1966 (Bougouriba mormyrid)
- Mormyrops engystoma Boulenger, 1898 (Matadi mormyrid)
- Mormyrops furcidens Pellegrin, 1900 (Alima mormyrid)
- Mormyrops intermedius Vinciguerra, 1928 (Rubi mormyrid)
- Mormyrops lineolatus Boulenger, 1898
- Mormyrops mariae (Schilthuis, 1891) (Kinshasa mormyrid)
- Mormyrops masuianus Boulenger, 1898
- Mormyrops microstoma Boulenger, 1898 (New Antwerp mormyrid)
- Mormyrops nigricans Boulenger, 1899 (Kutu mormyrid)
- Mormyrops oudoti Daget 1954 (Bamako mormyrid)
- Mormyrops parvus Boulenger, 1899 (parvus mormyrid)
- Mormyrops sirenoides Boulenger, 1898 (sirenoides mormyrid)
- Mormyrops zanclirostris (Günther, 1867)
