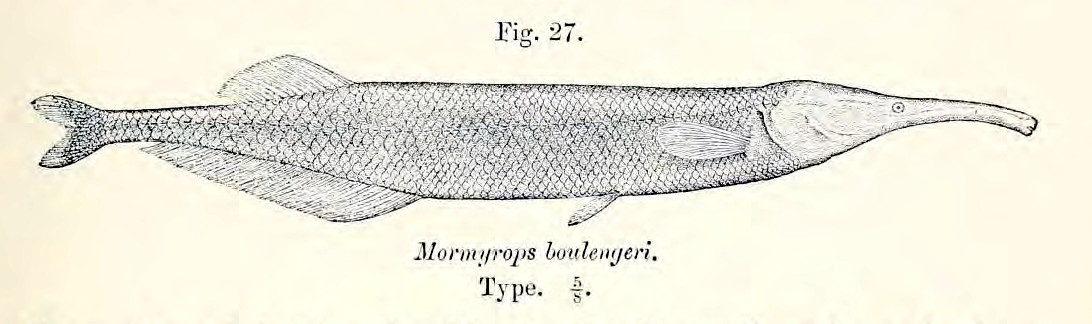
- Oxymormyrus boulengeri

Conservation status
- Least Concern (IUCN 3.1)

Scientific classification
- Kingdom: Animalia
- Phylum: Chordata
- Class: Actinopterygii
- Order: Osteoglossiformes
- Family: Mormyridae
- Genus: Oxymormyrus
- Species: O. boulengeri

Binomial name
- Oxymormyrus boulengeri Pellegrin, 1874

Synonyms
- Mormyrops boulengeri Pellegrin, 1874

= Oxymormyrus =

Genus of fishes

Oxymormyrus is a monospecific genus of freshwater ray-finned fish belonging to the family Mormyridae, the elephantfishes. The only species in the genus is Oxymormyrus boulengeri, which is found in the middle of the Congo River basin.
