= Paul Pappenheim =

- Born: Eugen Julius Adolf Paul Pappenheim; 20 September 1878; Berlin, German Empire
- Died: 12 May 1945 (aged 66); Berlin, Germany
- Education: Humboldt University of Berlin
- Known for: Director of the Zoological Museum Berlin (1926–1938)
- Scientific career
- Fields: Zoology, Ichthyology
- Workplaces: Museum für Naturkunde Berlin
- Thesis: Beiträge zur Kenntnis der Entwicklungsgeschichte von Dolomedes fimbriatus Clerck, mit besonderer Berücksichtigung der Bildung des Gehirns und der Augen (1902)
- Author abbrev. (zoology): Pappenheim

Eugen Julius Adolf Paul Pappenheim (20 September 1878 — 12 May 1945) was a German zoologist and, from 1 July 1926 to 9 November 1938, the second director of the Zoological Museum Berlin (today the Museum für Naturkunde). He also served as curator of the museum’s Ichthyological Department.

== Family ==
Paul Pappenheim was the son of Eugen Itzig Pappenheim (1831–1901) and his second wife Anna Pappenheim (born 1844). His mother and siblings Karl Pappenheim and Gertrud Pappenheim (1871–1964), as well as his half-sister Anna Agnes Dorothea Wiener (1886–1946), were all associated with Fröbelian pedagogy and the kindergarten movement. On 7 December 1922, he married Anna Marta Schröter, née Behm. His children were Ruth Pappenheim (born 28 August 1906) and Erich Pappenheim (born 12 April 1910).

== Biography ==
=== Education ===
Pappenheim graduated from the Köllnisches Gymnasium in Berlin in 1897 as one of seven students in his class. He then studied at the Friedrich Wilhelm University of Berlin from 22 October 1897 to 21 October 1901, earning his doctorate in 1902 from the Zoological Institute.

=== Early career and military training ===
Following his studies, Pappenheim worked as a technical assistant at the Zoological Institute before volunteering for active military service. He served in the Telegraph Battalion I from 1 October 1903 to 30 September 1904. He was assigned to manage the Pisces (fish) division of the Zoological Institute beginning 1 October 1904. After a brief hospital service in 1905, he was promoted to sergeant. He was stationed at the Garrison Hospital in Brandenburg an der Havel from 4 August to 28 September 1905.

=== Professional advancement ===
After returning from military service, Pappenheim worked at the Zoological Museum. He was employed as an assistant beginning 1 February 1906 and became curator on 20 February 1909. He received tenure on 1 August 1914.

=== Military service in World War I ===
During World War I, Pappenheim served in several field hospitals, including those at Chancey, Lincay, La Capelle, and Fourmier. From 31 December 1918 to 22 February 1919, he worked at the Reserve Hospital in Perleberg, after which he became an inspector of field hospitals. He did not participate in combat operations and was never a prisoner of war. On 31 March 1921, he was appointed Field Inspector.

=== Decorations and honors ===
For his service in the Telegraph Battalion, Pappenheim received the War Merit Cross on 8 March 1905. He was also awarded the Iron Cross 2nd Class on 28 July 1917. On 19 September 1938, he was granted the Faithful Service Medal (2nd Class, in Silver).

=== Return to scientific work ===
After returning from military service, Pappenheim resumed work at the Zoological Museum and was granted the title of professor on 31 July 1919. On 1 July 1926, he was appointed second director of the Zoological Museum Berlin. Beginning 1 April 1936, the Zoological Institute was transferred from the Faculty of Philosophy to the Faculty of Mathematics and Natural Sciences. As second director, Pappenheim was also a member of the Association of German Natural Science Museums and served as its treasurer from 1928 to 1936. Because of his paternal “non-Aryan” ancestry, he was pressured by the Reich Ministry of Science, Education and Culture to voluntarily retire. He requested dismissal and was officially relieved of his directorial duties on 9 November 1938. However, he retained his curatorial post to support his family financially.

== Politics ==
Pappenheim was not a member of the Nazi Party (NSDAP), the Stahlhelm, Bund der Frontsoldaten (NSDFB), or any other political organization. He was also not affiliated with Freemasons or any similar societies. He belonged only to the “Reich Association of Senior Civil Servants,” which was dissolved in 1933 and reconstituted under Nazi control in 1934.

== Publications ==
- Die Fische der deutschen Südpolarexpedition – Die Fische der Antarktis und Subantarktis 1901–1903. Reimer, Berlin 1914.
- Beiträge zur Kenntnis der Entwicklungsgeschichte von Dolomedes fimbriatus Clerck, mit besonderer Berücksichtigung der Bildung des Gehirns und der Augen. Berlin, PhD Dissertation, 15 August 1902.
- Ueber die Fischfauna des Rukwa-Sees. Sitzungsberichte der Gesellschaft Naturforschender Freunde zu Berlin, 1903, pp. 259–271.
- Ein neuer „pseudo“-elektrischer Fisch aus Kamerun, Mormyrus tapirus sp. n. Sitzungsberichte der Gesellschaft Naturforschender Freunde zu Berlin, 1905, pp. 217–219.
- Neue und ungenügend bekannte elektrische Fische (Fam. Mormyridae) aus den deutsch-afrikanischen Schutzgebieten. Sitzungsberichte der Gesellschaft Naturforschender Freunde zu Berlin, 1906, pp. 260–264.
- Zur Systematik und Variationsstatistik der Mormyriden hauptsächlich aus den deutsch Afrikanischen Schutzgebieten. Mitteilungen aus dem Zoologischen Museum in Berlin, 3(3), 1907, pp. 339–367.
- Fische von der Deutschen Zentral-Afrika Expedition 1907–1908. Wissenschaftliche Ergebnisse der Deutschen Zentral-Afrika Expedition, 5(2), 1914, pp. 225–260.
- Fische aus Ostkamerun. Sitzungsberichte der Gesellschaft Naturforschender Freunde zu Berlin, 1926, pp. 133–134.
