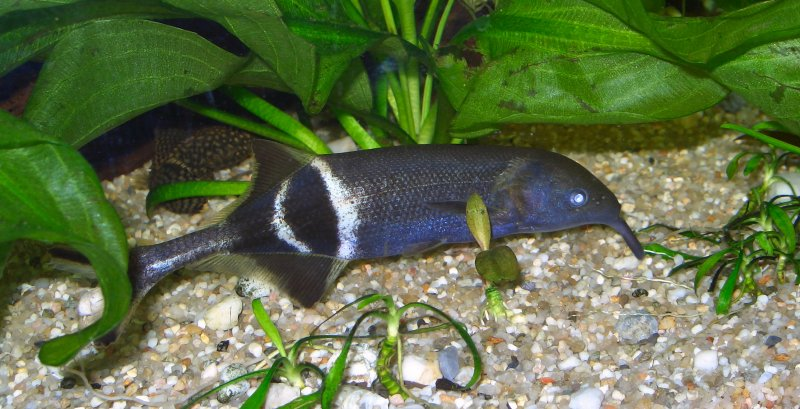
- Gnathonemus petersii

Scientific classification
- Kingdom: Animalia
- Phylum: Chordata
- Class: Actinopterygii
- Division: Teleostei
- Order: Osteoglossiformes
- Family: Mormyridae

Genera
- see text

= Mormyridae =

Freshwater elephantfish

Family of ray-finned fishes

The Mormyridae, sometimes called elephantfish (more properly freshwater elephantfish), are a family of weakly electric fish in the order Osteoglossiformes native to Africa. It is by far the largest family in the order, with around 200 species. Members of the family can be popular, if challenging, aquarium species. These fish have a large brain size and unusually high intelligence.

They are not to be confused with the marine and brackish-water callorhinchid elephantfish (family Callorhinchidae) of Southern Hemisphere oceans.

== Description and biology ==
The elephantfish are a diverse family, with a wide range of different sizes and shapes. The smallest are just 5 cm (2.0 in) in adult length, while the largest reach up to 1.5 m (4.9 ft). They do, however, have a number of unique features in common. Firstly, their cerebellum is greatly enlarged, enabling them to interpret complex bio-electrical signals. Secondly, an auditory vesicle (a small bladder) is present inside the labyrinth of the left and right inner ears. This vesicle, together with a bag with an otolith (sacculum containing the otolith sagitta), itself communicating to the lagena (containing the otolith asteriscus), is in fact unique among vertebrates, completely independent of the other organs; it is neither connected to the labyrinth to which only one otolith bag (the utriculus containing the otolith lapillus) is attached, nor is it connected to the swim bladder (except in embryos) of which it has the same histological structure, nor is it therefore related to the pharynx.

Some species possess modifications of their mouthparts to facilitate electrolocating and feeding on small invertebrates buried in muddy substrates. The shape and structure of these leads to the popular name "elephant-nosed fish" for those species with particularly prominent mouth extensions. The extensions to the mouthparts usually consist of a fleshy elongation attached to the lower jaw. They are flexible, and equipped with touch, and possibly taste, sensors. The mouth is not protrusible, and the head (including the eyes), the dorsum, and belly are covered by a thin layer of skin that is perforated with small pores leading to electroreceptors.

The retina is called a "grouped retina", an eye structure seen in mormyrids and a few other fishes. Instead of being smooth, their retina is composed of tiny cups, acting like parabolic mirrors. Because of the murky waters they inhabit, the cones in their eyes have adapted to see only red light. The cups are made of four layers of light-reflecting proteins, funneling red light to areas of cones, intensifying its brightness 10-fold, while the rods are hit by light from other wavelengths. Only a single gonad is present, located on the left side of their body. The Mormyridae and the closely related genus Gymnarchus are also unique in being the only vertebrates where the male sperm cell does not have a flagellum.

=== Electric fields ===
Mormyromast, a type of electroreceptor found only in mormyrid fishes

Elephantfish possess electric organs that generate weak electric fields, and electroreceptors (ampullae of Lorenzini, knollenorgans, and Mormyromasts) that detect small variations in these electric fields caused by the presence of prey or other objects of different conductivities. This allows them to sense their environment in turbid waters where vision is impaired by suspended matter.

Electric fish can be classified into two types: pulse fish or wave fish. Pulse-type discharges are characterized by long intervals between electric discharges, whereas wave-type discharges occur when the interval between consecutive pulses is so brief that the discharges fuse together to form a wave. The electric discharge is produced from an electric organ that evolved from muscle, as can also be seen in gymnotiform electric fish, electric rays, and skates. The convergent evolution between the South American gymnotiforms and the African Mormyridae is remarkable, with the electric organ being produced by the substitution of the same amino acid in the same voltage-gated sodium channel despite the two groups of fish being on different continents and the evolution of the electric sense organ being separated in time by around 60 million years. Convergent changes to other key transcription factors and regulatory pathways in both Gymnotiforms and Mormyridae also contributed to the evolution of the electric sense organ.

== Classification ==
The roughly 221 species of elephantfish which are sometimes grouped into two subfamilies, the Mormyrinae and Petrocephalinae. The latter has only a single genus:

Phylogeny

- Mormyridae
  - Petrocephalinae
    Petrocephalus
  - Mormyrinae
    - Myomyrus
    - - Mormyrops
      - - - Brienomyrus
          - Isichthys
        - - Mormyrus
          - - - - Pollimyrus
                - Stomatorhinus
              - - Paramormyrops
                - - Cryptomyrus
                  - - Boulengeromyrus
                    - Ivindomyrus
            - - - Hyperopisus
                - - Brevimyrus
                  - Hippopotamyrus
              - - - Campylomormyrus
                  - Gnathonemus
                - - Genyomyrus
                  - Marcusenius

Eschmeyer's Catalog of Fishes classifies the family as follows Family Mormyridae

- Boulengeromyrus Taverne & Géry, 1968
- Brevimyrus Taverne 1971
- Brienomyrus Taverne, 1971
- Campylomormyrus Bleeker, 1874
- Cryptomyrus J. P. Sullivan, Lavoué & C. D. Hopkins, 2016
- Cyphomyrus Pappenheim, 1906
- Genyomyrus Boulenger, 1898
- Gnathonemus Gill, 1863
- Heteromormyrus Steindachner, 1866
- Hippopotamyrus Pappenheim, 1906
- Hyperopisus Gill, 1862
- Isichthys Gill, 1863
- Ivindomyrus Taverne & Géry, 1975
- Marcusenius Gill, 1862
- Mormyrops J. P. Müller, 1843
- Mormyrus Linnaeus, 1758
- Myomyrus Boulenger, 1898
- Oxymormyrus Bleeker, 1874
- Paramormyrops Taverne, Thys van den Audenaerde & Heymer, 1977
- Petrocephalus Marcusen, 1854
- Pollimyrus Taverne, 1971
- Stomatorhinus Boulenger, 1898

== In culture ==
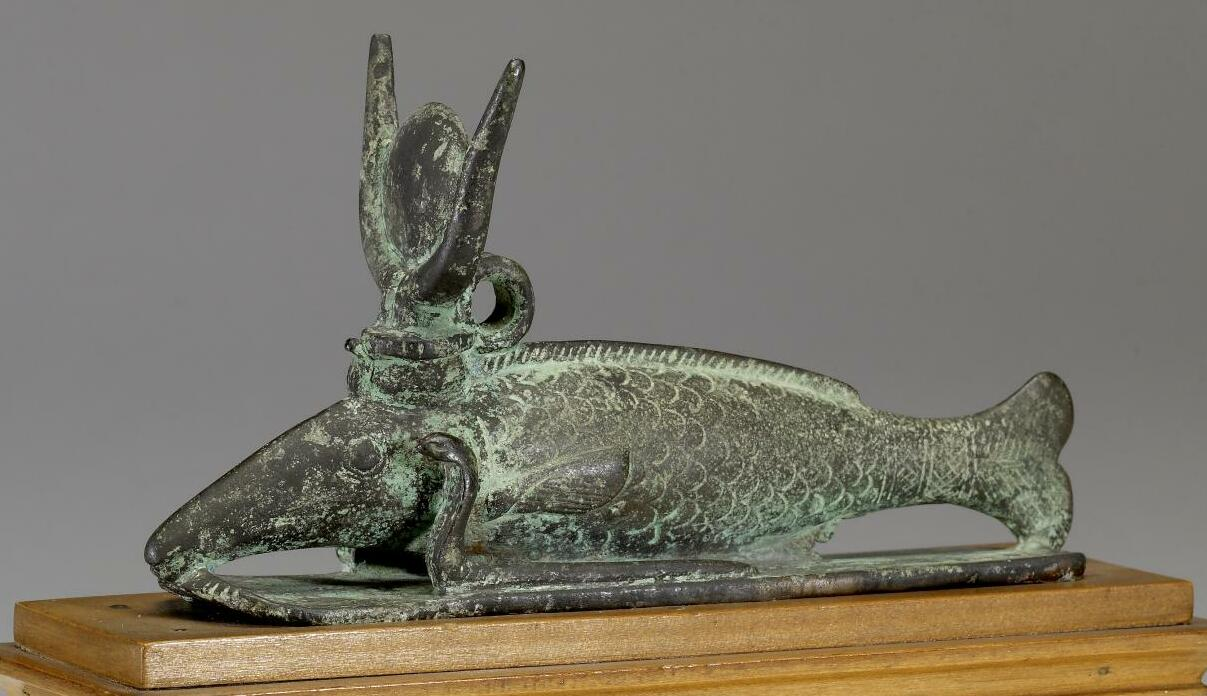
Bronze figurine of Oxyrhynchus fish, Late Period-Ptolemaic Egypt

The Medjed was a sacred fish in Ancient Egypt. At the city of Per-Medjed, better known as Oxyrhynchus, whose name means "sharp-nosed" after the fish, archaeologists have found fishes depicted as bronze figurines, mural paintings, or wooden coffins in the shape of fishes with downturned snouts, with horned sun-disc crowns like those of the goddess Hathor. The depictions have been described as resembling members of the genus Mormyrus.
