= Osteobrama bhimensis =

Scientific classification
- Domain: Eukaryota
- Kingdom: Animalia
- Phylum: Chordata
- Class: Actinopterygii
- Order: Cypriniformes
- Family: Cyprinidae
- Genus: Osteobrama
- Species: O. bhimensis

Binomial name
- Osteobrama bhimensis D. F. Singh & Yazdani, 1992

Species of fish

Osteobrama bhimensis is a species of ray-finned fish in the genus Osteobrama. Osteobrama bhimensis is a synonym of Osteobrama vigorsii but valid on its own according to Fishbase.
