= Athi =

Athi may refer to:

== People ==
- Athi Mafazwe (born 1997), South African cricket player
- Athi Mayinje, South African rugby player
- Athi-Patra Ruga (born 1984), South African artist

== Places ==
- Athi, Kenya
- Athi River (town), Kenya
- Athi River, part of the Athi-Galana-Sabaki River in Kenya

== Species ==
- Athi rufous-naped lark
- Athi elephant-snout fish
- Athi sardine
- Athi short-toed lark

== Other ==
- Athi people
- Athi River Mining, also known as ARM Cement Limited
- Athi Veerapandiyan, planned film
- Athi Varadar, deity image
