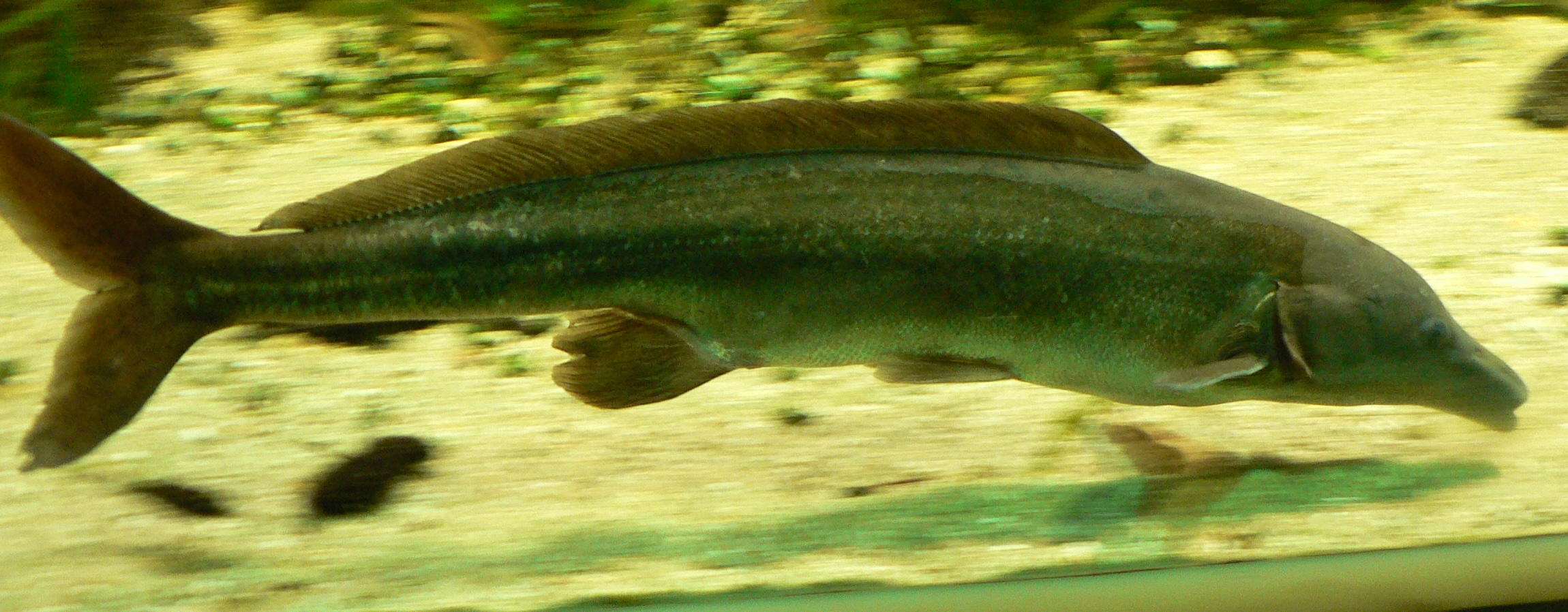

Scientific classification
- Kingdom: Animalia
- Phylum: Chordata
- Class: Actinopterygii
- Division: Teleostei
- Order: Osteoglossiformes
- Family: Mormyridae
- Genus: Mormyrus; Linnaeus, 1758

Species
- See text

Synonyms
- Mormyrodes Gill 1862; Mormyrus (Scrophicephalus) Swainson 1838; Scrophicephalus (Swainson 1838); Solenomormyrus Bleeker 1874

= Mormyrus =

Genus of ray-finned fishes

Mormyrus is a genus of ray-finned fish in the family Mormyridae. They are weakly electric, enabling them to navigate, to find their prey, and to communicate with other electric fish.

== Species ==
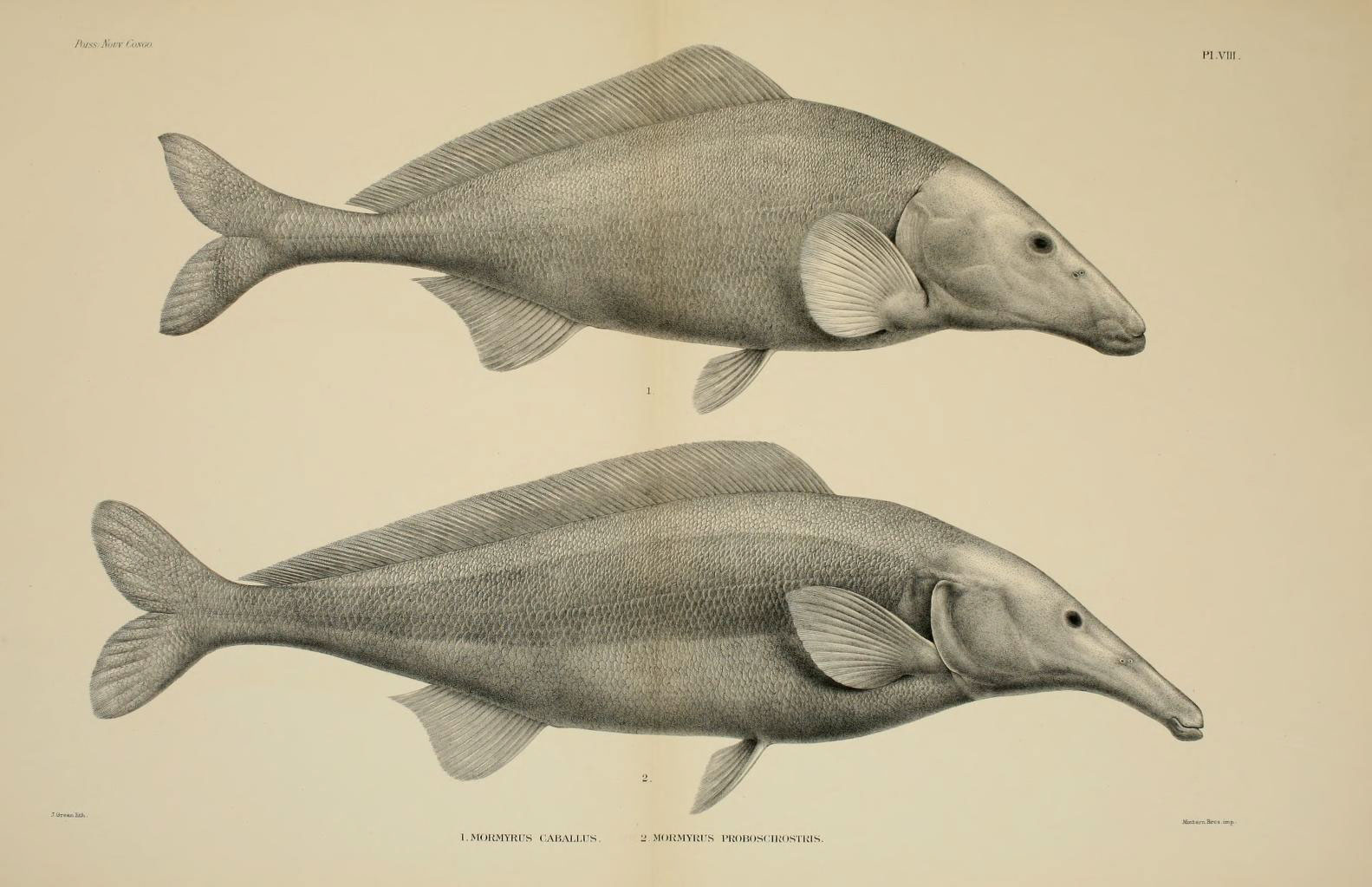
Mormyrus caballus (above), Mormyrus rume (below)

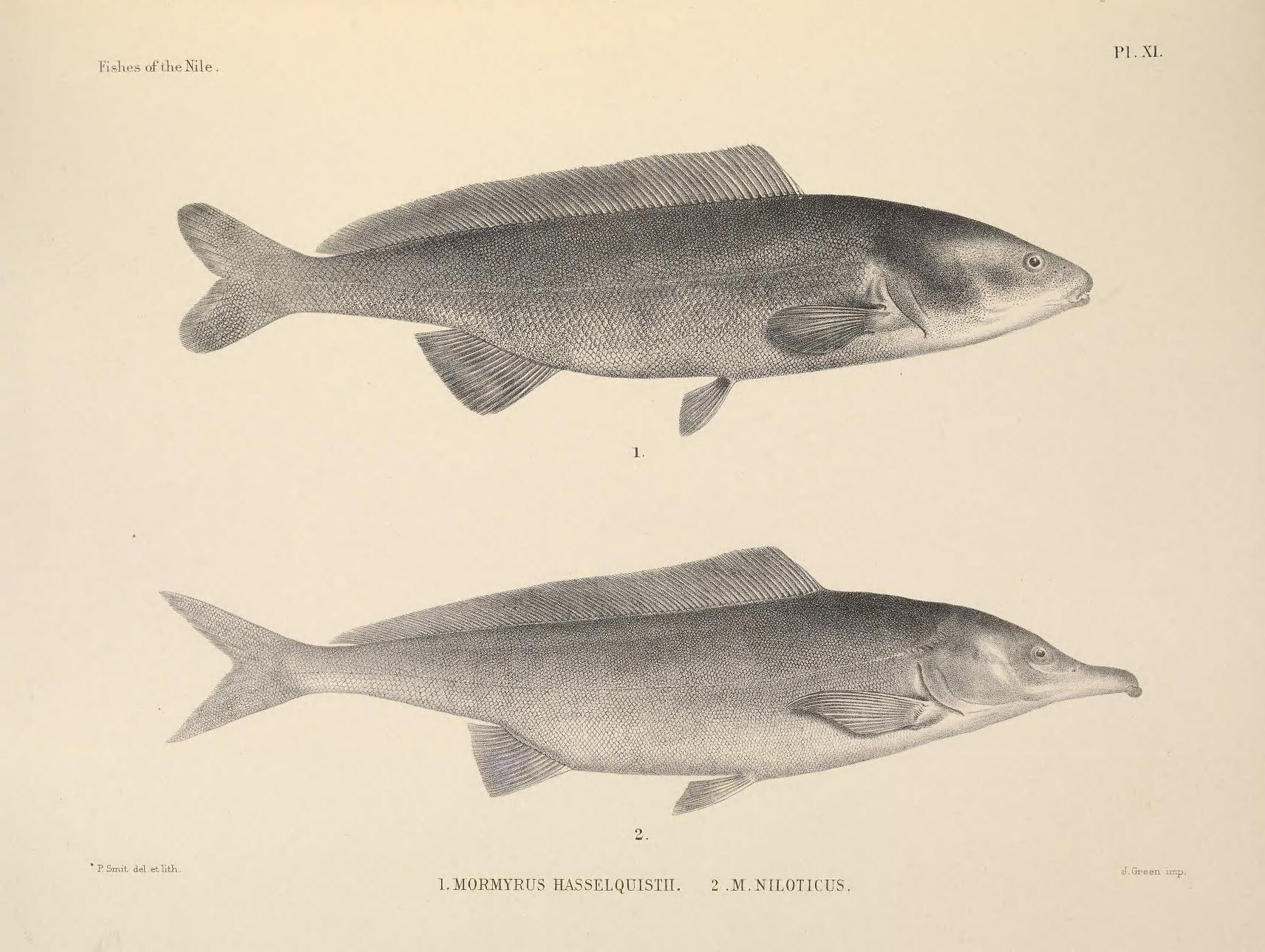
Mormyrus hasselquistii (above), Mormyrus niloticus (below)

There are currently 22 recognized species in this genus:

- Mormyrus bernhardi Pellegrin, 1926 (Bernhard's elephant-snout fish)
- Mormyrus caballus Boulenger, 1898
  - Mormyrus caballus asinus Boulenger, 1915
  - Mormyrus caballus bumbanus Boulenger, 1909
  - Mormyrus caballus caballus Boulenger, 1898
  - Mormyrus caballus lualabae Reizer, 1964
- Mormyrus casalis Vinciguerra, 1922 (Somali mormyrid)
- Mormyrus caschive Linnaeus, 1758 (Eastern bottlenose elephant snout)
- Mormyrus cyaneus T. R. Roberts & D. J. Stewart, 1976 (Lower Congo River mormyrid)
- Mormyrus goheeni Fowler, 1919 (Liberian mormyrid)
- Mormyrus hasselquistii Valenciennes, 1847 (Elephant snout)
- Mormyrus hildebrandti W. K. H. Peters 1882 (Hildebrandt's elephant-snout fish)
- Mormyrus iriodes T. R. Roberts & D. J. Stewart, 1976 (Inga mormyrid)
- Mormyrus kannume Forsskål, 1775 (Elephant-snout fish)
- Mormyrus lacerda Castelnau, 1861 (Western bottlenose mormyrid)
- Mormyrus longirostris W. K. H. Peters, 1852 (Eastern bottlenose mormyrid)
- Mormyrus macrocephalus Worthington, 1929 (largehead mormyrid)
- Mormyrus macrophthalmus Günther, 1866 (Niger mormyrid)
- Mormyrus niloticus (Bloch & J. G. Schneider, 1801) (Egyptian trunkfish)
- Mormyrus ovis Boulenger, 1898
- Mormyrus rume Valenciennes, 1847 (Senegal mormyrid)
  - Mormyrus rume proboscirostris Boulenger, 1898
  - Mormyrus rume rume Valenciennes 1847
- Mormyrus subundulatus T. R. Roberts, 1989 (Bandama mormyrid)
- Mormyrus tapirus Pappenheim 1905
- Mormyrus tenuirostris W. K. H. Peters, 1882 (Athi elephant-snout fish)
- Mormyrus thomasi Pellegrin, 1938 (French Congo mormyrid)

== In culture ==
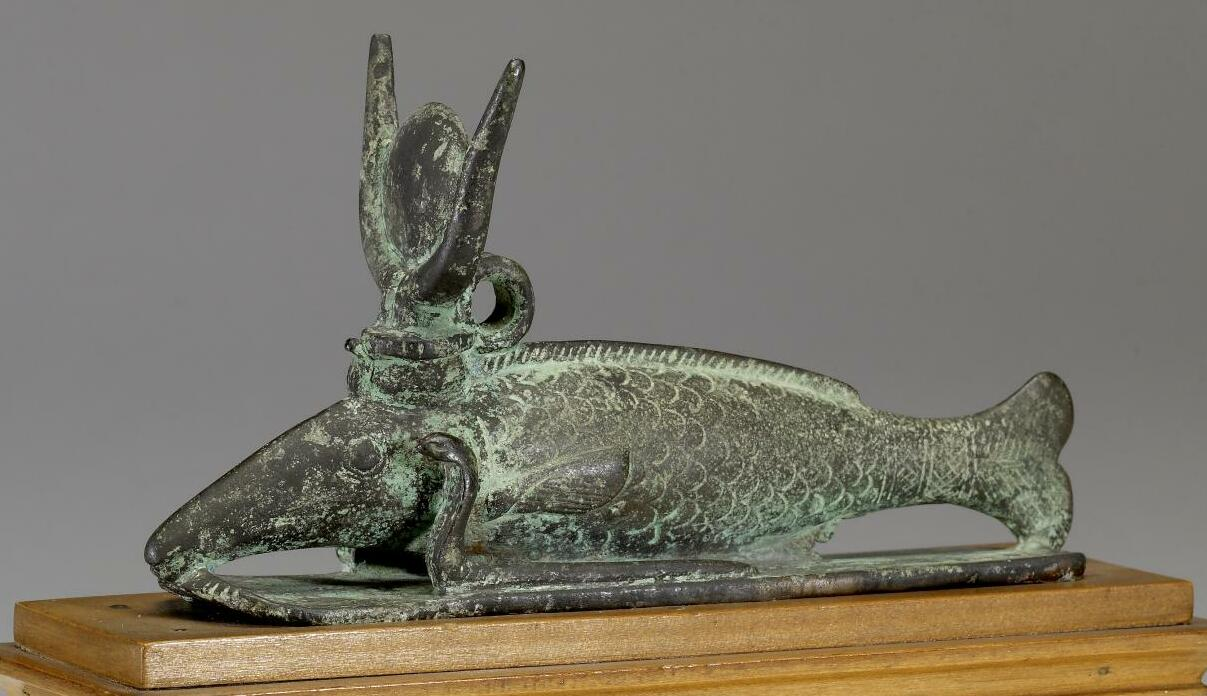
Bronze figurine of Oxyrhynchus fish, Late Period-Ptolemaic Egypt

The Medjed was a sacred fish in Ancient Egypt. At the city of Per-Medjed, better known as Oxyrhynchus, whose name means "sharp-nosed" after the fish, archaeologists have found fishes depicted as bronze figurines, mural paintings, or wooden coffins in the shape of fishes with downturned snouts, with horned sun-disc crowns like those of the goddess Hathor. The depictions have been described as resembling members of the genus Mormyrus.
