= Osteobrama peninsularis =

Conservation status
- Data Deficient (IUCN 3.1)

Scientific classification
- Domain: Eukaryota
- Kingdom: Animalia
- Phylum: Chordata
- Class: Actinopterygii
- Order: Cypriniformes
- Family: Cyprinidae
- Genus: Osteobrama
- Species: O. peninsularis

Binomial name
- Osteobrama peninsularis Silas, 1952

Species of fish

Osteobrama peninsularis is a species of freshwater ray-finned fish from the carp and minnow family, the Cyprinidae. It occurs in the Indian states of Andhra Pradesh, Karnataka, Maharashtra and Kerala. It has been recorded from the drainages of the Krishna River and the Godavari River as well as the Periyar River. Formerly this taxon was confused with Osteobrama cunma and this means that its distribution is uncertain, although it is described as common in Pune and the surrounding areas and in Karnataka. Like O. cunma it was formerly treated as a subspecies of Osteobrama cotio.
