= Neobola =

Scientific classification
- Kingdom: Animalia
- Phylum: Chordata
- Class: Actinopterygii
- Order: Cypriniformes
- Family: Danionidae
- Subfamily: Chedrinae
- Genus: Neobola; Vinciguerra, 1895

Type species
- Neobola bottegoi Vinciguerra, 1895

Species
- 5, see text.

Genus of fishes

Neobola is a genus of freshwater ray-finned fishes belonging to the family Danionidae, the danios or danionins. The fishes in this genus are found mostly in East Africa. There are currently five species in this genus.

== Species ==
Neobola contains the following species;

- Neobola bottegoi Vinciguerra, 1895
- Neobola fluviatilis (Whitehead, 1962) (Athi Sardine)
- Neobola kinondo Bart, Schmidt, Nyingi & Gathua, 2019
- Neobola nilotica F. Werner, 1919
- Neobola stellae (Worthington, 1932)
