= Neobola bottegoi =

Conservation status
- Data Deficient (IUCN 3.1)

Scientific classification
- Kingdom: Animalia
- Phylum: Chordata
- Class: Actinopterygii
- Order: Cypriniformes
- Family: Danionidae
- Subfamily: Chedrinae
- Genus: Neobola
- Species: N. bottegoi

Binomial name
- Neobola bottegoi Vinciguerra, 1895

Synonyms
- Engraulicypris bottegi (Vinciguerra, 1895)

Species of fish

Neobola bottegoi is a species of ray-finned fish in the family Danionidae. It is endemic to Lake Turkana and the Omo River of Ethiopia. It can reach a maximum length of 7.3 cm.

== Etymology ==
Named in honor of Italian Army officer Vittorio Bottego (1860-1897), who led expedition to Somalia (1895-1897), during which type specimen was collected.
