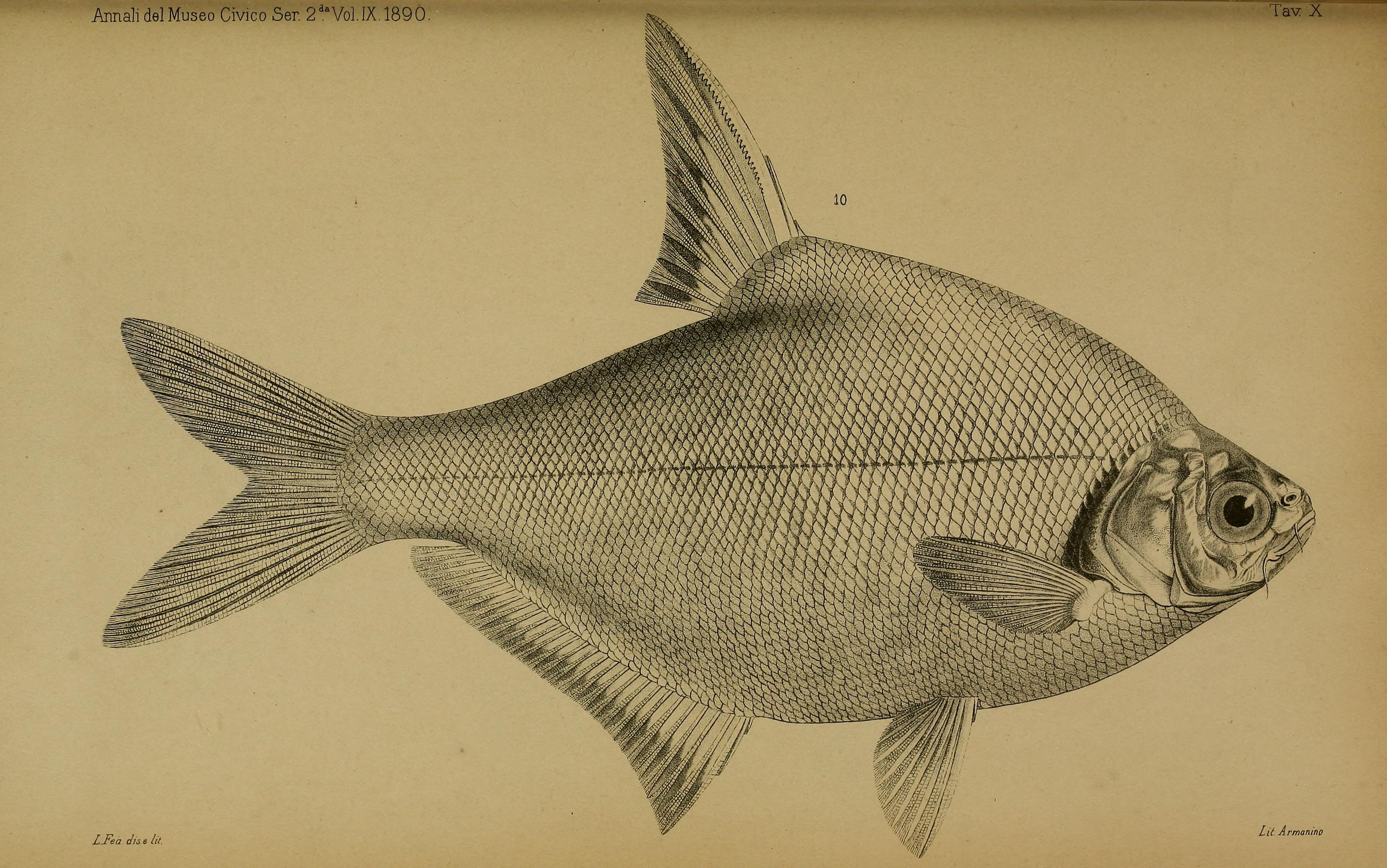
- Osteobrama feae (Vinciguerra, 1890)

Conservation status
- Least Concern (IUCN 3.1)

Scientific classification
- Kingdom: Animalia
- Phylum: Chordata
- Class: Actinopterygii
- Order: Cypriniformes
- Family: Cyprinidae
- Genus: Osteobrama
- Species: O. feae

Binomial name
- Osteobrama feae Vinciguerra, 1890

Synonyms
- Rohtee feae (Vinciguerra, 1890)

= Osteobrama feae =

Species of fish

Osteobrama feae is a species of ray-finned fish in the genus Osteobrama which is found in the Indian state of Manipur and in Myanmar, being common throughout its range. It grows to 15 cm in length and is of minor fisheries interest. This species has 65 lateral line scales and a very deep laterally compressed body which is bright silvery in colour becoming a more olive shade on the back. It has a rounded snout with a pair of mandibular barbels and a pair of maxillary barbels. The specific name honours the collector of the type, the Italian zoologist Leonardo Fea (1852-1903).
