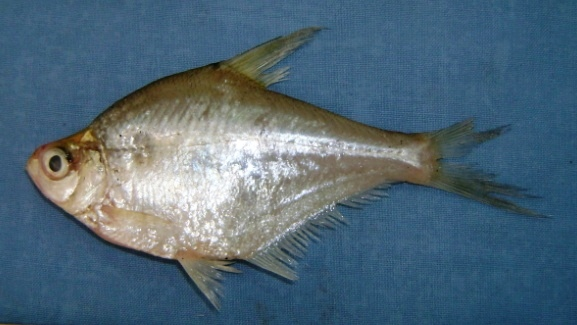

Conservation status
- Least Concern (IUCN 3.1)

Scientific classification
- Kingdom: Animalia
- Phylum: Chordata
- Class: Actinopterygii
- Order: Cypriniformes
- Family: Cyprinidae
- Genus: Osteobrama
- Species: O. cotio

Binomial name
- Osteobrama cotio (Hamilton, 1822)

Synonyms
- Cyprinus cotio Hamilton, 1822; Leuciscus cotio (Hamilton, 1822); Rohtee cotio (Hamilton, 1822); Leuciscus gangeticus Swainson, 1839; Abramis gangeticus (Swainson, 1839)

= Osteobrama cotio =

Species of fish

Osteobrama cotio is a species of ray-finned fish in the genus Osteobrama. This species had three subspecies named O. cotio cotio, O. cotio cunma and O. cotio peninsularis but these are now considered separate species. This species is found in the drainage basins of the Ganges-Brahmaputra including Jiri River in Manipur, Barak River in Silchar, in Brahmaputra River, Uzan Bazaar in Assam, and in Bihar, Madhya Pradesh, Uttar Pradesh, and Punjab in India, and in Bangladesh. The presence of O. cotio in southern India and from the Indus basin of India and Pakistan needs to be confirmed. This species is threatened by extensive loss of habitat caused by pollution and deforestation.

Adults of O. cotio inhabit rivers, lakes, ponds and ditches and have a largely insectivorous diet which means they may be useful in controlling mosquito larvae.
