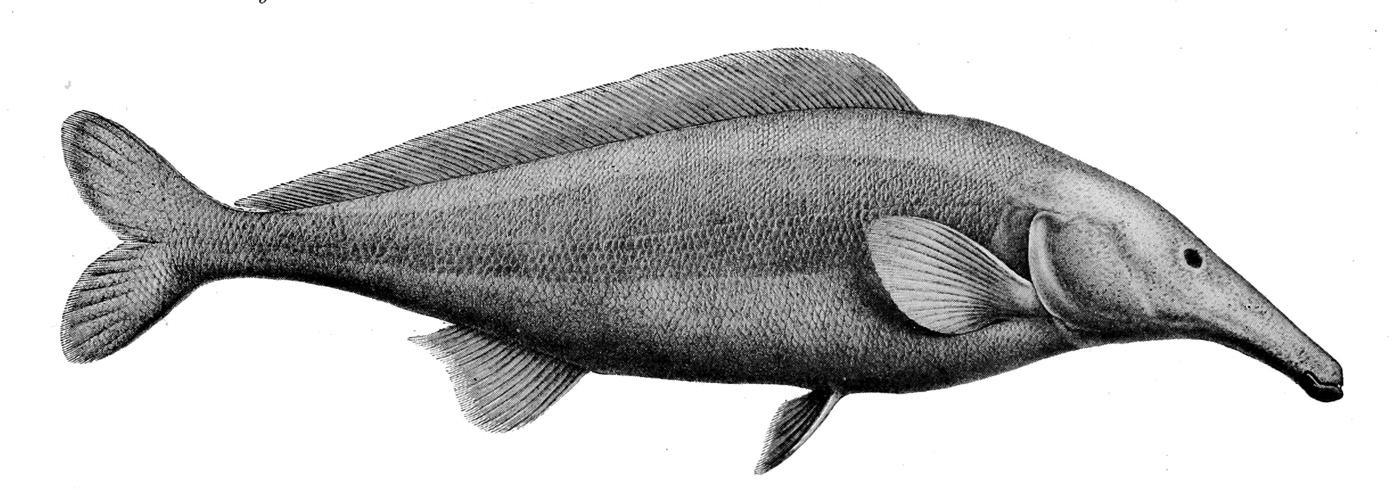
- Mormyrus rume

Conservation status
- Least Concern (IUCN 3.1)

Scientific classification
- Kingdom: Animalia
- Phylum: Chordata
- Class: Actinopterygii
- Order: Osteoglossiformes
- Family: Mormyridae
- Genus: Mormyrus
- Species: M. rume

Binomial name
- Mormyrus rume Valenciennes, 1847

Synonyms
- Mormyrops bozasi Pellegrin, 1903; Mormyrus bozasi (Pellegrin, 1903); Mormyrus jubelini Valenciennes, 1847; Mormyrus proboscirostris Boulenger, 1898

= Mormyrus rume =

Species of fish

Mormyrus rume is a species of electric fish in the family Mormyridae, found in the basins of the Gambia, Senegal, Niger, Volta, Chad, Bandama, Sassandra, Komoé, Mono, Ouémé, Ogun and Culufi rivers, among others.

This species contains the following subspecies:

- Mormyrus rume proboscirostris (Boulenger, 1898): can reach a size of approximately 60 mm (2.4 in);
- Mormyrus rume rume (Valenciennes, 1847): can reach a size of approximately 100 mm (3.9 in).
