= Giovanni Roncagli =

- Born: 1857
- Died: 1929 (aged 71–72)
- Occupation: Hydrographer

Giovanni Roncagli (1857–1929) was an Italian naval officer and hydrographer.

== Biography ==
Roncagli was born in 1857. He enlisted in the navy in 1875, attending the Royal Naval School of Naples. In his biography Vita di mare he tells of his early career, at a time when sailing ships were only slowly being replaced by steam. Roncagli was the hydrographer for the Italian expedition to explore Patagonia and Tierra del Fuego of 1881–1882, led by Giacomo Bove. Decio Vinciguerra was officially both zoologist and botanist, but in fact Carlos Luigi Spegazzini from Buenos Aires handled the botanical work. The geologist Domenico Lovisato made up the scientific party.

Giovanni Roncagli became a navy captain, an expert in commercial geography and a member of the Italian Naval League. He was secretary general of the Italian Geographic Society from 1897 until World War I (1914–1918). He also became director of the Navy's historical section. He was a pioneer in aeronautical topography in Italy, which quickly turned out to be of great importance in World War I. In 1913 Roncagli presented a report to the Tenth International Geographical Congress in Rome in which he discussed the need for an international aeronautical map.

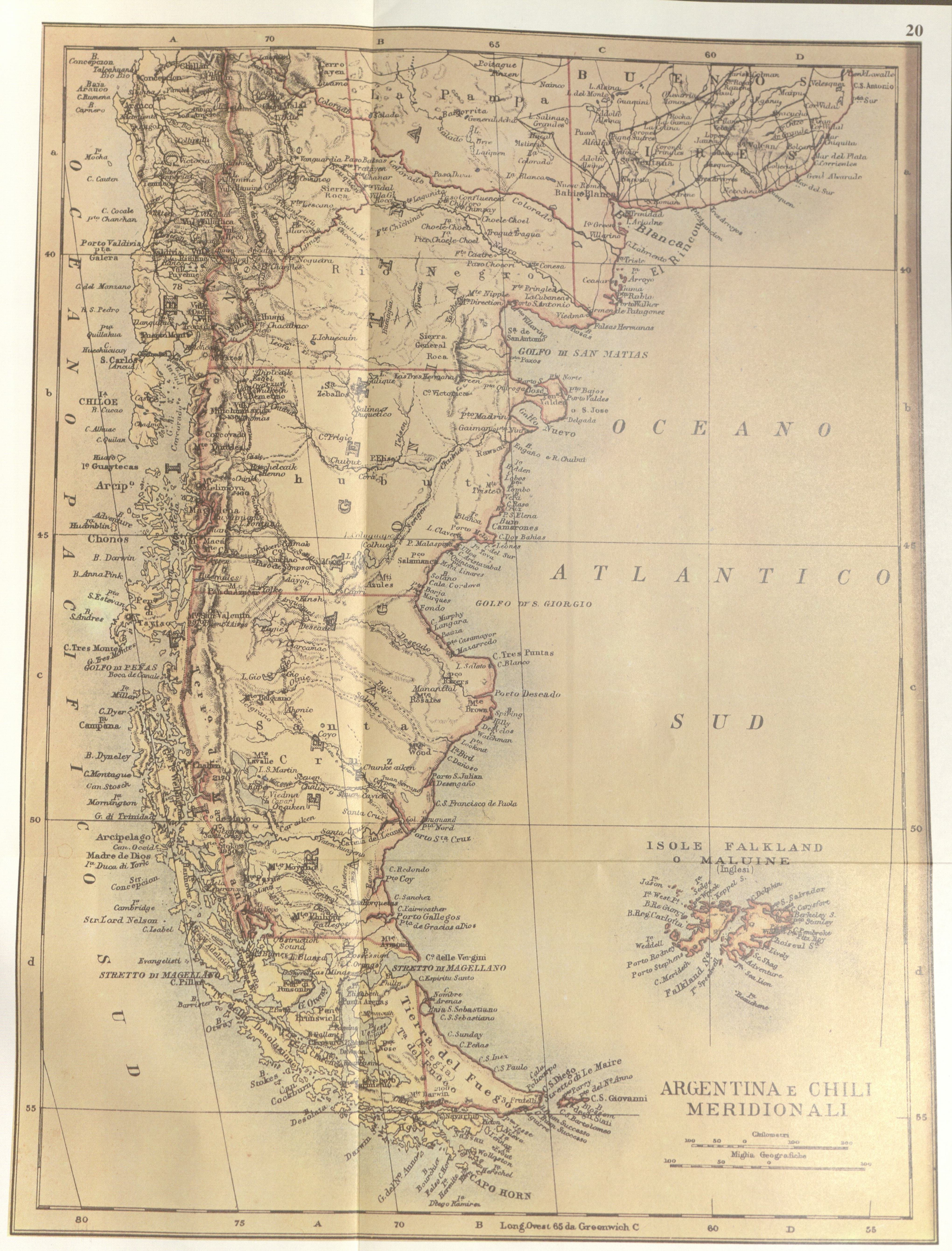
Southern Argentina and Chile from Roncagli's Atlante Mondiale Hoepli

== Bibliography ==
- Roncagli, Giovanni (1899). Atlante mondiale Hoepli di geografia moderna fisica e politica seconda edizione rifatta: 80 carte con indice generale completo e speciale per il sistema alpino ed una introduzione storica. Hoepli.
- Roncagli, Giovanni (1900). Giovanni Roncagli,... L'Italia in casa e fuori... carte e cartine... con indice completo dei nomi e brevi note geografico-statistiche. U. Hoepli.
- Roncagli, Giovanni (May 2010). Responsabilita Marittime (1906). Kessinger Publishing. ISBN 978-1-162-18873-7.
- Roncagli, Giovanni (1911). Vita di mare.
- Roncagli, Giovanni (1913). Per la cartografia aereonautica. Presso La Reale Società Geographica.
- Roncagli, Giovanni (1918). Le problème militaire de l'Adriatique vulgarisé. Reale societa geografica italiana.
- Giovanni Roncagli (1918). Dalle origini al decreto di sovranità su la Libia. Hoepli.
- Roncagli, Giovanni (1919). The strategical problem of the Adriatic: a popular explanation of Italy's defensive needs. Royal Italian Geographical Society.
- Roncagli, Giovanni (1922). Un condottiero, il generale Cadorna nelle sue memorie di guerra e negli atti della Commissione d'inchiesta ... La Vita italiana.
- Roncagli, Giovanni; Manfroni, Camillo (1926). Guerra Italo-turca: 1911–1912 : cronistoria delle operazioni navali. Dal decreto di sovranità sulla Libia alla conclusione della pace / Camillo Manfroni. U. Hoepli.

== Notes and references ==
Citations

Sources

- Akerman, James R. (2006-10-01). Cartographies of Travel and Navigation. University of Chicago Press. ISBN 978-0-226-01074-8.
- Andrea, G.M. (25 January 2009). "Vita Di Mare". Betasom.
- Bonasera, Francesco (1971). "BOVE, Giacomo". Dizionario Biografico degli Italiani (in Italian). Vol. 13. Trecanni.
- Bowman, Isaiah; Wrigley, G. M. (1917). Geographical Review. American Geographical Society.
- Gianassi, Elisa (2007). "La Spedizione De Filippi in India e Asia Centrale (1913–1914)" (PDF).
- Godley, E.J. (July 1970). "Botany of the Southern Zone Exploration, 1847–1891". Tuatara. 18 (2).
- "Grandi esploratori (sec. XIX-XX)". Christies.
