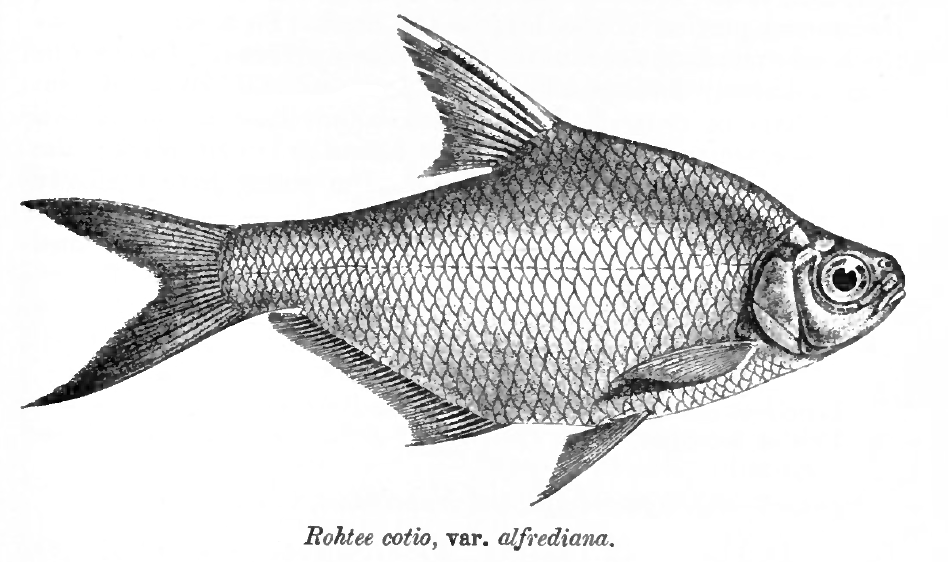
- Osteobrama alfredianus
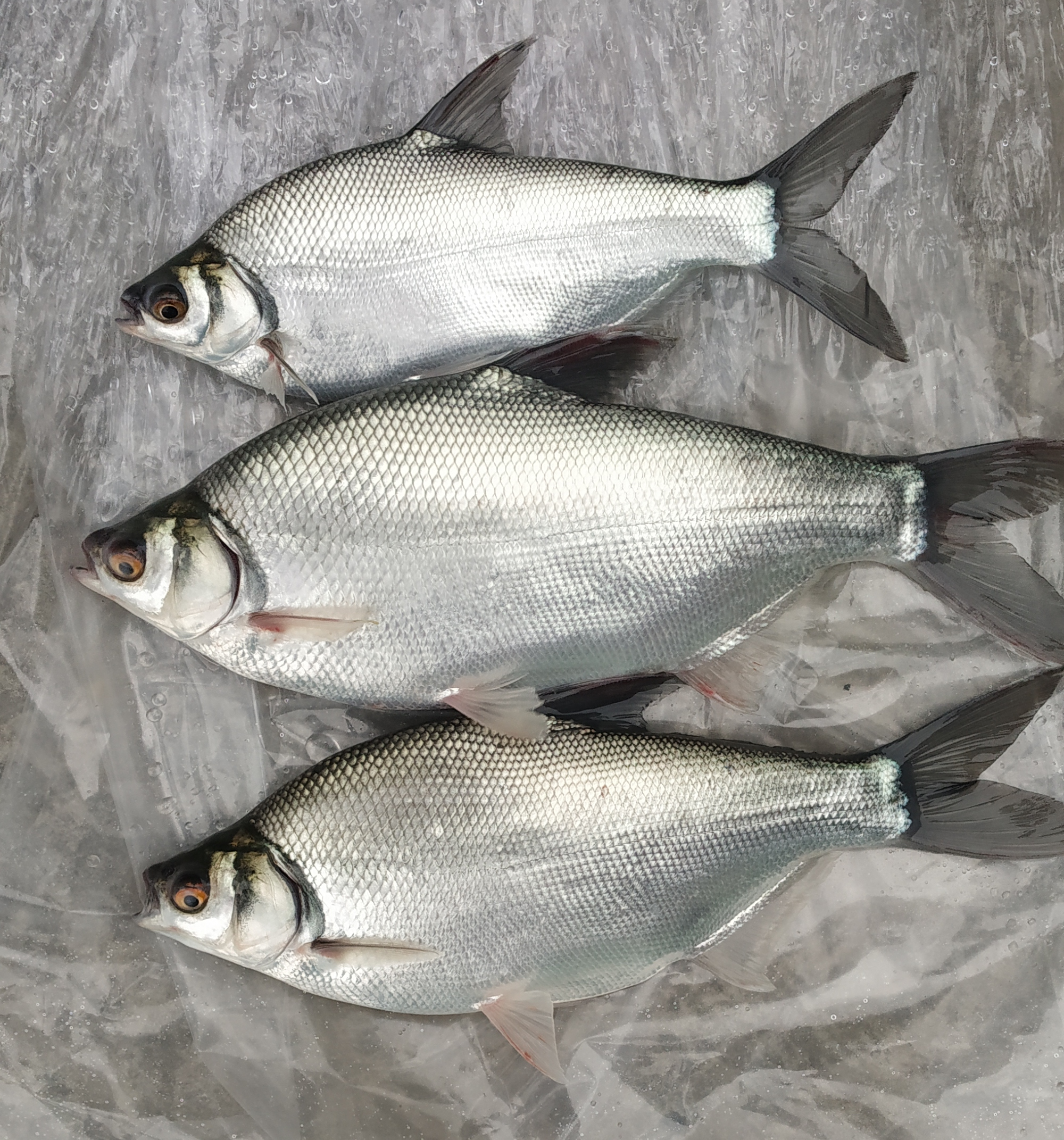
- Osteobrama belangeri

Scientific classification
- Kingdom: Animalia
- Phylum: Chordata
- Class: Actinopterygii
- Order: Cypriniformes
- Family: Cyprinidae
- Subfamily: Smiliogastrinae
- Genus: Osteobrama; Heckel, 1843

Type species
- Cyprinus cotio Hamilton, 1822

Species
- 11, see text.

Synonyms
- Smiliogaster Bleeker, 1860

= Osteobrama =

Genus of fishes

Osteobrama is a genus of cyprinid fish found in southern Asia consisting of eight species. The name is derived from the Greek word osteon, meaning "bone", and the Old French word breme, a type of freshwater fish.

== Species ==
These are the species in the genus:

- Osteobrama alfredianus (Valenciennes, 1844)
- Osteobrama bakeri (Day, 1873)
- Osteobrama belangeri (Valenciennes, 1844)
- Osteobrama cotio (Hamilton, 1822)
- Osteobrama cunma (Day, 1888)
- Osteobrama dayi (Hora & Misra, 1940)
- Osteobrama feae Vinciguerra, 1890
- Osteobrama neilli (Day, 1873)
- Osteobrama peninsularis Silas, 1952
- Osteobrama tikarpadaensis Shangningam, Rath, Tudu & Kosygin, 2020
- Osteobrama vigorsii (Sykes, 1839)

Fishbase formerly regarded O. bhimensis as a synonym of O. vigorsii, and also treats the former subspecies of O. cotio as distinct species: O. cunma and O. peninsularis, which is not supported by ITIS or WoRMS.
