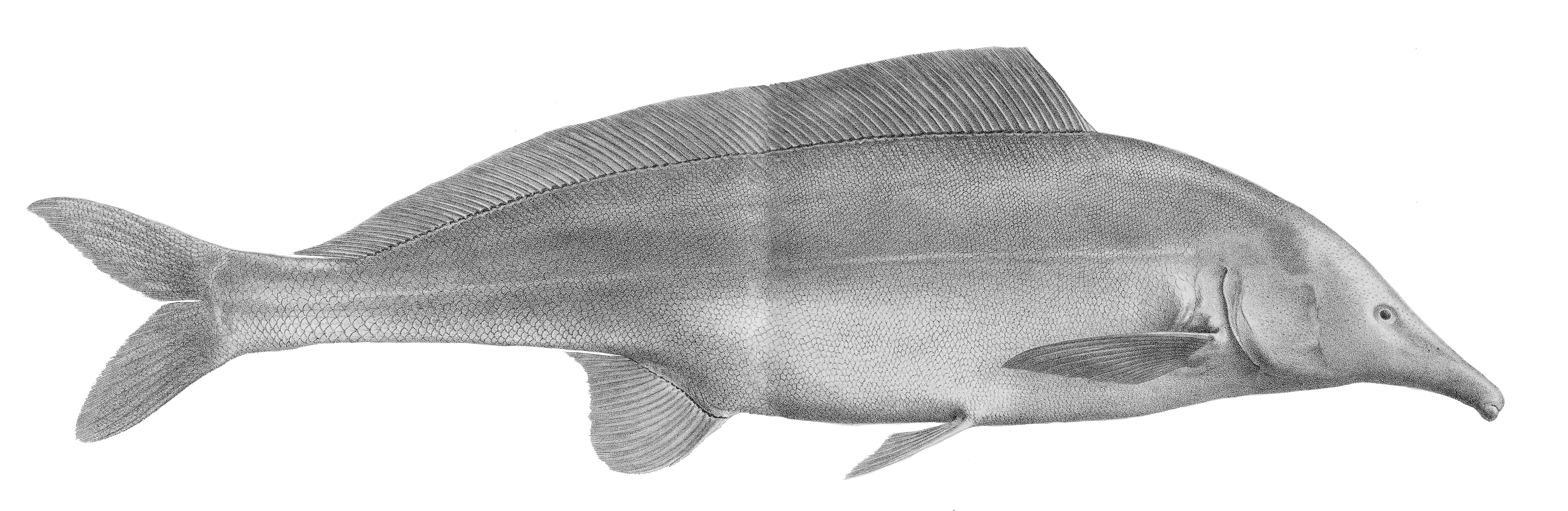

Conservation status
- Least Concern (IUCN 3.1)

Scientific classification
- Kingdom: Animalia
- Phylum: Chordata
- Class: Actinopterygii
- Division: Teleostei
- Order: Osteoglossiformes
- Family: Mormyridae
- Genus: Mormyrus
- Species: M. caschive

Binomial name
- Mormyrus caschive Linnaeus, 1758

= Mormyrus caschive =

Species of ray-finned fish

Mormyrus caschive, also known as the eastern bottlenose or elephant snout, is a species of ray-finned fish belonging to the family Mormyridae. This species inhabits the Nile basin, including the main river and various tributaries and lakes across Egypt, Ethiopia, South Sudan, Sudan and Uganda.
