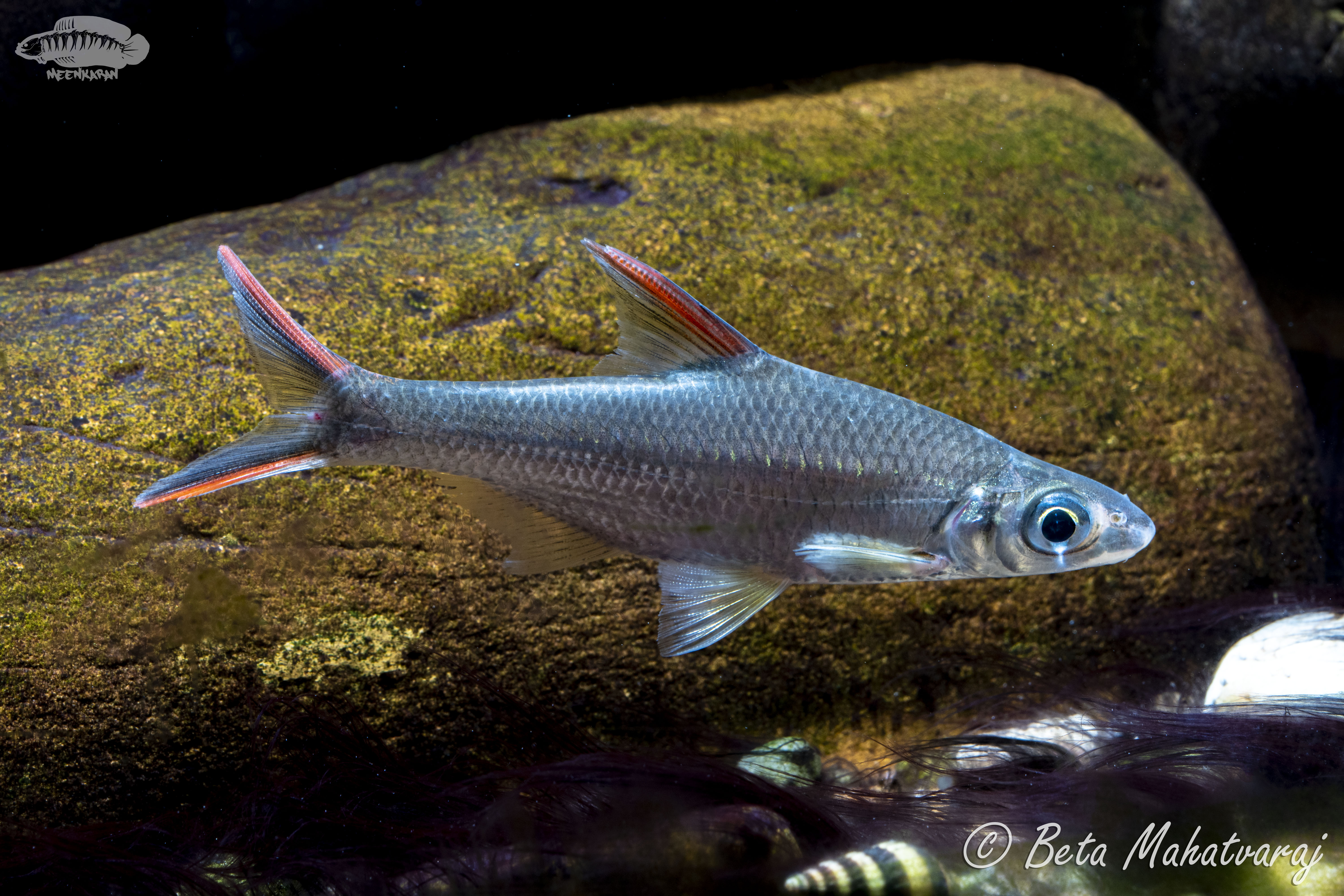

Conservation status
- Least Concern (IUCN 3.1)

Scientific classification
- Kingdom: Animalia
- Phylum: Chordata
- Class: Actinopterygii
- Order: Cypriniformes
- Family: Cyprinidae
- Genus: Osteobrama
- Species: O. bakeri

Binomial name
- Osteobrama bakeri (F. Day, 1873)

Synonyms
- Rohtee bakeri Day, 1873

= Osteobrama bakeri =

Species of fish

Osteobrama bakeri is a species of ray-finned fish in the genus Osteobrama. It is endemic to streams in the southern Western Ghats of Kerala where it has been recorded from the rivers Chaliyar; Periyar, Chalakudy, Karuvannur, Muvattupuzha, Meenachil, Manimala, Chandragiri, Bharathapuzha, Pamba, Kallada and Achenkovil.

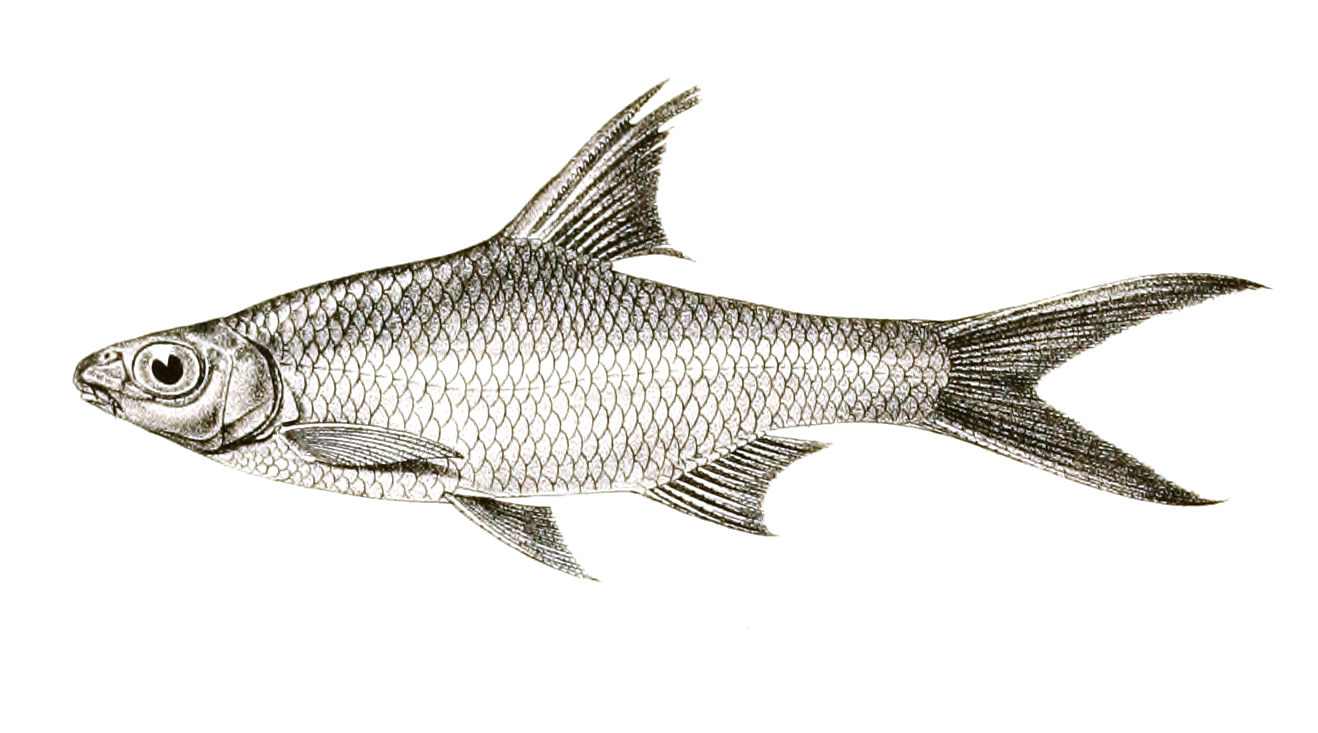
Illustration

== Footnotes ==
- Froese, Rainer; Pauly, Daniel (eds.). "Osteobrama bakeri". FishBase.
