= Domenico Lovisato =

Italian geologist

- Born: 12 August 1842; Isola, Istria
- Died: 23 February 1916 (aged 73); Cagliari, Italy
- Occupation: Geologist

Domenico Lovisato (12 August 1842 – 23 February 1916) was an Italian geologist. He was a very early proponent of the theory of continental drift.

== Education ==
Domenico Lovisato was born in Isola, in Istria, then part of the Austrian Empire on 12 August 1842. He was the third of five children. His father died when he was very young, leaving the family extremely poor. However, with the help of relatives and family friends, he was able to complete his primary and secondary education, enrolling in the University of Padua in 1862 to study mathematics. He was vocal in seeking independence, and was arrested eight times. In 1864 he was tried for high treason but acquitted for lack of evidence. In 1865 he was banned from all schools in the Habsburg Empire, but this was changed to suspension and a period of confinement. When war broke out against Austria in 1866 he fought as a volunteer in Trentino, and was noticed by Giuseppe Garibaldi. Returning to university. he graduated in January 1867.

== Career ==
Lovisato began assisting at the university and then teaching mathematics and physics in the secondary school in Sondrio. While at Sondrio he formed a working relationship with the geologist Torquato Taramelli and with the mining engineer and mountaineer Felice Giordano. A manuscript recording a speech that he made in Sondrio in 1874 is interesting since it proposes a theory of continental drift forty years before Alfred Wegener formally proposed his theory. Lovisato pointed out the extraordinary similarity between the coast of South America and Africa, and suggested that the two continents could once have been linked. His manuscript was, however, never published, perhaps because of a lack of a scientific framework for such a theory at the time. He moved on to teach at schools in Sassari in 1874, Girgenti (now Agrigento) in 1875 and Catanzaro in 1876. At Catanzaro he undertook significant research into geology and paleontology. Based on this work, in 1878 he was appointed professor of mineralogy at the University of Sassari.

Felice Giordano recommended that Lovisato be asked to join an expedition to Patagonia and Tierra del Fuego sponsored by the Italian Geographical Society and funded by the Argentine government. The expedition, led by Giacomo Bove, took place between December 1881 and September 1882. On this trip Decio Vinciguerra was officially both zoologist and botanist, but in fact Carlos Luigi Spegazzini from Buenos Aires handled the botanical work. The hydrographer Giovanni Roncagli made up the scientific party. Lovisato's diaries of the expedition cover a range of subjects other than geology, including palaeontology, botany and ethnography. The government of Argentina invited him to continue his work in Argentina, but he declined and returned to Italy.

In 1884 Lovisato was appointed professor of mineralogy and geology at the University of Cagliari in Cagliari, Sardinia, a position that he held for the next thirty years. During that period he taught, conducted research, and published over 100 titles, many on the geology of Sardinia. He died in Cagliari on 23 February 1916.
