= Mormyrus hildebrandti =

Conservation status
- Data Deficient (IUCN 3.1)

Scientific classification
- Kingdom: Animalia
- Phylum: Chordata
- Class: Actinopterygii
- Order: Osteoglossiformes
- Family: Mormyridae
- Genus: Mormyrus
- Species: M. hildebrandti

Binomial name
- Mormyrus hildebrandti W. K. H. Peters, 1882

Species of ray-finned fish

Mormyrus hildebrandti is a species of ray-finned fish in the family Mormyridae. It is endemic to Kenya. It is threatened by habitat loss.
