= Mormyrus cyaneus =

Conservation status
- Vulnerable (IUCN 3.1)

Scientific classification
- Kingdom: Animalia
- Phylum: Chordata
- Class: Actinopterygii
- Order: Osteoglossiformes
- Family: Mormyridae
- Genus: Mormyrus
- Species: M. cyaneus

Binomial name
- Mormyrus cyaneus T. R. Roberts & D. J. Stewart, 1976

Species of fish

Mormyrus cyaneus is a species of electric fish in the family Mormyridae. It is native to the Democratic Republic of the Congo and can reach a size of approximately 260 mm (10 in).

Regarding its conservation status, according to the IUCN, this species can be classified as "vulnerable (VU)".
