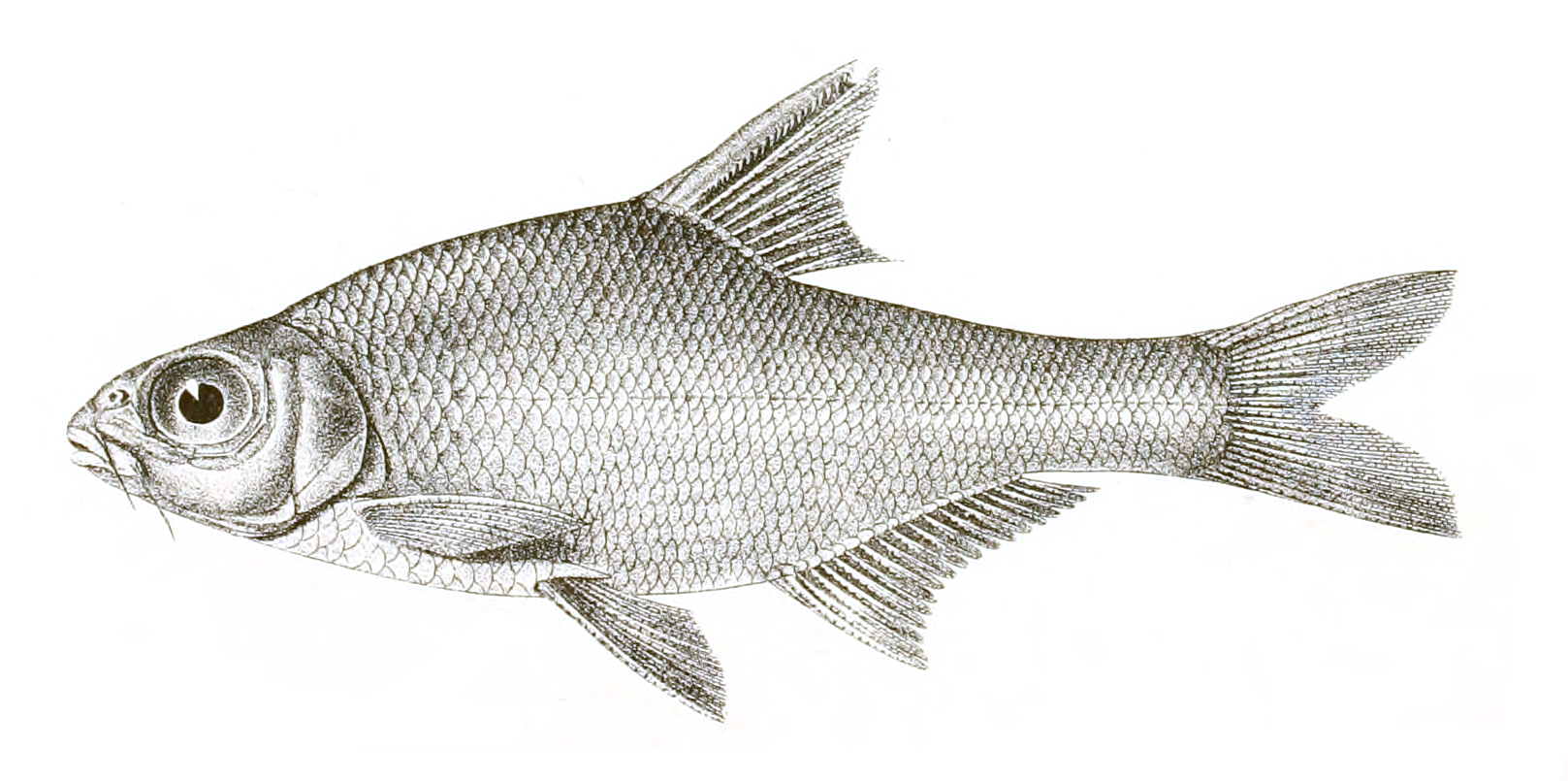

Conservation status
- Least Concern (IUCN 3.1)

Scientific classification
- Kingdom: Animalia
- Phylum: Chordata
- Class: Actinopterygii
- Order: Cypriniformes
- Family: Cyprinidae
- Genus: Osteobrama
- Species: O. neilli

Binomial name
- Osteobrama neilli (F. Day, 1873)

Synonyms
- Rohtee neilli Day, 1873

= Osteobrama neilli =

Species of fish

Osteobrama neilli is a species of ray-finned fish in the genus Osteobrama.

== Overview ==
Osteobrama neilli is a small freshwater Minnow endemic to fast flowing clear streams and rivers in the Western Ghats in the states of Maharashtra, Karnataka, Andhra Pradesh and Tamil Nadu. Fully growing to be no longer than 5 inches, the fish is inedible, and therefore only used as bait. Its appearance is a small silver colored minnow with black stripes perpendicular to its body. Osteobrama neilli is rated least concern by IUCN for endangerment.
