= Giacomo Bove =

Italian explorer (1852–1887)

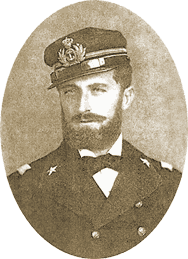
- Born: 23 April 1852; Maranzana
- Died: 9 August 1887 (aged 35); Verona
- Occupation: Explorer

Giacomo Bove (23 April 1852 – 9 August 1887) was an Italian explorer. He sailed with Adolf Erik Nordenskiöld on the first voyage through the north-east passage, and later explored Tierra del Fuego and the Congo River.

== Early years ==
Giacomo Bove was born in Maranzana, Asti, Piedmont, on 23 April 1852 to Francesco Bove and Antonia Garbarino. He was the eldest of five brothers. His family owned a vineyard and made wine for sale. He went to primary school in Maranzana and then in Acqui Terme, before being admitted to the Naval Academy in Genoa. He graduated with honors, and was able to serve as a midshipman on the scientific expedition of the Governolo to the Far East.

The Governolo mission (1872–1873) mapped the coast of Borneo, performed hydrological surveys, and studied the ethnography of the local people. The Governolo also visited Malaya, the Philippines, China and Japan. Apart from its scientific goals, Italy was interested in opening up trade with Japan, which was emerging from a long period of isolation, and if possible to obtain silk worms to replace those of northern Italy, which had been devastated by disease.

On 24 September 1876 Bove was promoted to the rank of Second Lieutenant. In April 1877 he was sent to the Strait of Messina on the Washington to study ocean currents.

== Northeast passage ==
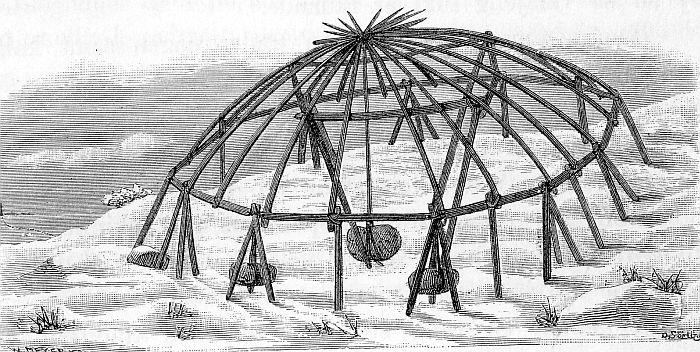
Yaranga frame of the Chukchi people near Pitlekaj, drawn by Bove

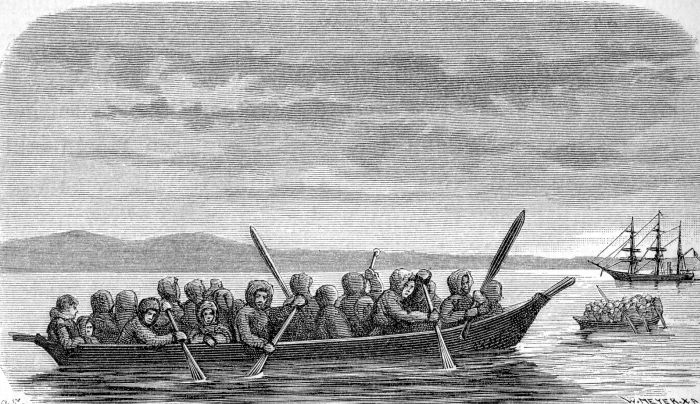
Chukchi boats by Olof Sörling, 1880, from Nordenskiöld's book of the expedition. The Vega in the background was equipped with sail as well as steam power.

In 1878 Lieutenant Giacomo Bove was chosen to participate in the Vega expedition of Adolf Erik Nordenskiöld to search for the north-east passage. Bove represented Italy on the expedition, and acted as sailing master. He was in charge of the chronometers and made the astronomical observations needed to fix the ship's position.

The steamer Vega left Karlskrona on 22 June 1878, picking up Nordenskiöld on 17 July at Tromsø. Vega crossed the Barents sea, and accompanied by three cargo vessels sailed along the northern coast of Russia, arriving at Dikson on 6 August 1878. Leaving two of the cargo ships to sail inland from that port to collect cargoes of grain, the Vega and Lena skirted the coast to the mouth of the Lena River, where the Lena left on 28 August 1878 to sail up the river to Yakutsk. The Vega continued onward, but was forced by worsening conditions to anchor on 28 September 1878 in Kolyuchinskaya Bay, only 130 miles (210 km) from the Bering Strait.

The Vega was icebound until 18 July 1879, but used the time to undertake scientific research and to study the ethnography of the local Chukchi people. The crew built shelters from blocks of ice, from which the scientists made magnetic and meteorological observations. Nordenskiöld records an account by Lieutenant Bove of a trip he made accompanied by the hunter Johnson on New Year's Day to check the condition of the ice towards the sea.

I left the vessel on the forenoon of 1st January and reached the open water after four hours' steady walking. The deep loose snow made walking very fatiguing, and three rows of torosses (Note: A torrosse is a large structure of ice formed when ice floes are pushed upward and stacked vertically.) also contributed to this, mainly in consequence of the often snow-covered cracks, which crossed the ice-sheet in their neighborhood. One of the torosses was ten meters high. The size of the blocks of ice, which were here heaped on each other, showed how powerful the forces were that had formed the torosses. These ice ramparts now afford a much-needed protection to the Vega's winter haven.

After leaving the winter stopping point, the ship steamed south via the Bering Strait, Chukotka peninsula, St. Lawrence Island and Commander Islands to Japan, then homeward via China, Singapore, Ceylon and the Suez Canal. The Vega reached Naples on 4 February 1880, then continued on to Stockholm. The round trip had covered a distance of 22,189 miles (35,710 km).

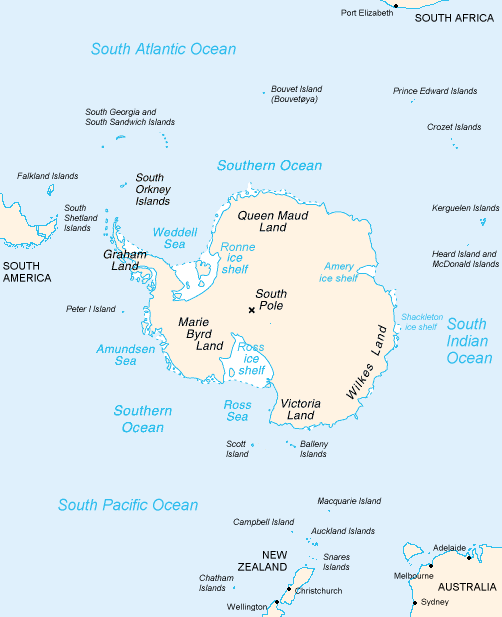
Antarctica. Bove planned to explore Graham Land, south of Argentina, then circumnavigate the continent at the highest latitude possible before sailing north to South Africa.

== Argentina ==
=== Planning ===
On his return to Europe, Bove was made a Knight of the Order of the Dannebrog by King Christian IX of Denmark. His home town of Maranzana gave him a gold medal and on 20 June 1880 he was appointed a Lieutenant of the Italian Royal Navy. Bove devoted his efforts to organizing an expedition to the Antarctic to continue the scientific observations that had been made by the English navigator James Clark Ross. He wanted to sail westward around Antarctica, staying as far south as possible. Bove's idea was endorsed by Cristoforo Negri, President of the Italian Geographic Society, but the newly formed Italian state was not able to afford the cost.

Bove visited Argentina, where he made contact with Dr. Estanislao Zeballos of the Argentine Geographic Institute. Zeballos was interested in his plans and raised the interest of the authorities in the "Argentine Austral Expedition". A commission was established to find funding. General Julio Argentino Roca, President of Argentina, assigned the corvettes Uruguay and Cabo de Horno to the expedition. Where Bove had wanted to stop at Tierra del Fuego, then explore the coast of Graham Land, circumnavigate Antarctica and return north to Cape Town, the modified plan for the Expedicion Austral Argentina had exploration of the coasts of Patagonia, Tierra del Fuego and Isla de los Estados (Staten Island) as its main goal. The first stage was to survey the region of Patagonia and Tierra del Fuego to improve navigation and find areas with good potential for fishery, and the second stage was to explore Graham Land to the south, if possible.

=== First expedition ===
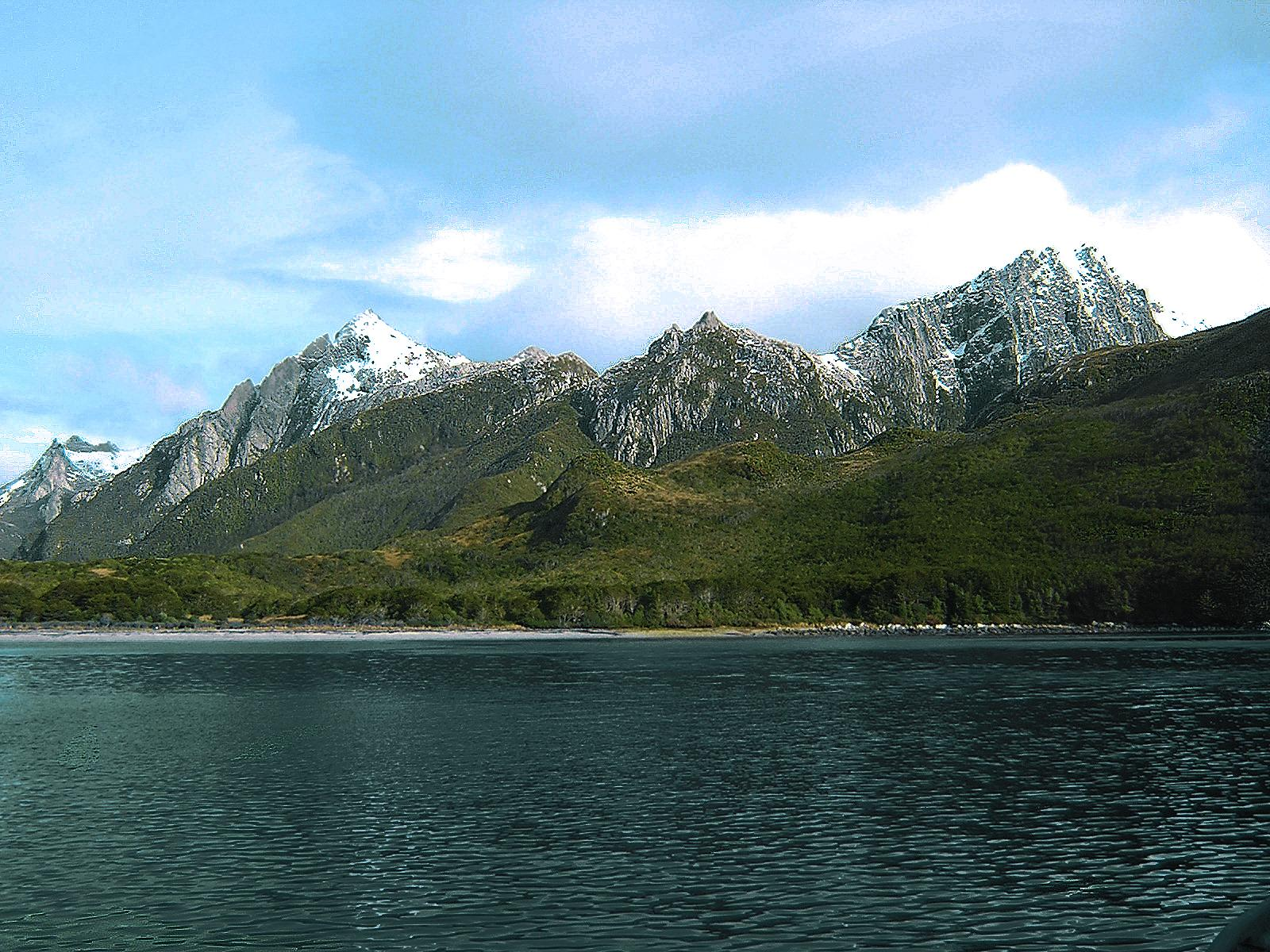
North coast of Isla de los Estados (Staten Island)

On 7 June 1881 Bove married Louise Bruzzone, a widow. Three months later, on 3 September 1881 he sailed for Argentina in the Europe. Bove's group left Buenos Aires on 17 December 1881 in the corvette Cabo de Hornos commanded by Luis Piedrabuena. On this trip Decio Vinciguerra was officially both zoologist and botanist, but in fact Carlos Luigi Spegazzini from Buenos Aires handled the botanical work. The geologist Domenico Lovisato and the hydrologist Giovanni Roncagli made up the scientific party. The expedition stopped at Puerto Santa Cruz, and reached Port Roca on the north of the Isla de los Estados on 8 February 1882.

By 10 April the Cabo de Hornos was in Possession Bay, leaving for Gregory Bay on 15 April. Bove became impatient with the corvette's slow progress and rode to Punta Arenas where he hired the San Jose, a smaller and more manoeuvrable vessel, more suitable for the local conditions. Leaving Punta Arenas on 1 May 1882, the San Jose was in Sloggett Bay by 28–31 May, where it was driven ashore in a storm. A cutter from the English Mission at Ushuaia picked them up and took them back to Punta Arenas, and they eventually got back to Buenos Aires on 3 September 1882. On this trip the expedition also visited the Malvinas, or Falkland Islands. Although some of the objects collected were lost in the shipwreck, the expedition made useful hydrographic and meteorological observations, and collected ethnographic information on the Fuegans, described in a report published in 1883. Some of the information on their religious beliefs were supplied by the local missionaries.

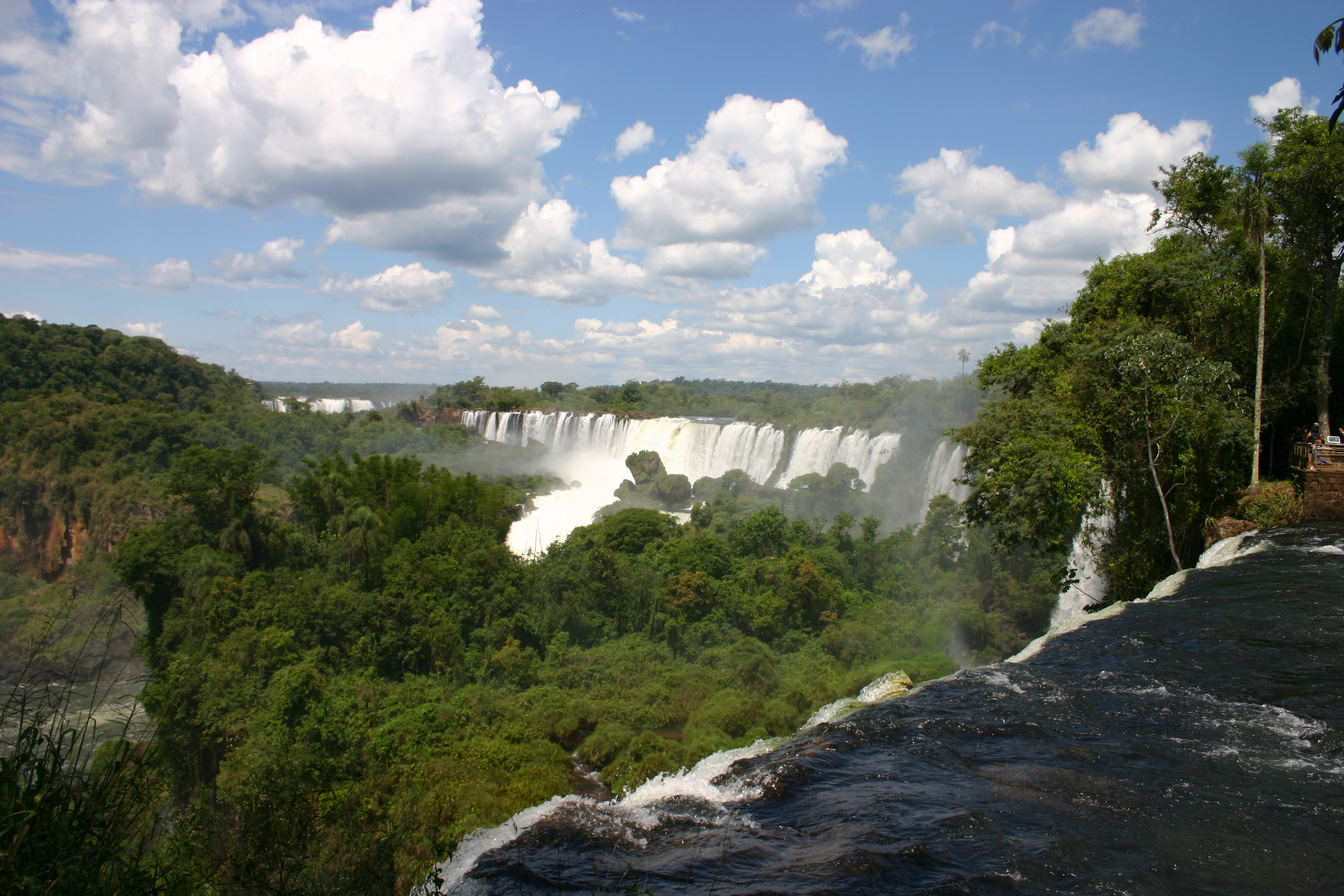
Iguazu Falls from the Argentine side

=== Second expedition ===
On 28 January 1883 Bove was named an honorary member of the Italian Geographic Society. Bove made a second voyage to Argentina, again funded by Argentina, sailing from Genoa on 3 July 1883 on the steamer Sud America. He reached Buenos Aires later that month with two Italians, Carlo Bossetti and Adam Lucchesi. They reached the northeast territory of Misiones on 20 September 1883, sailed up the Paraná River to Ituzaingó and explored the territory between there and the Iguazu Falls, giving Italian names to many of the Iguazu cataracts.

Bove and his companions returned to Buenos Aires on 10 January 1884. Accompanied by his wife, Bove conducted a new survey of the Tierra del Fuego region in the schooner Cilota. On this expedition Bove was able to collect 25 large boxes of anthropological, ethnographic, zoological and botanical material. While in Argentina, Bove again tried to get backing for an Antarctic exploration voyage from members of the growing and prosperous Italian community in Buenos Aires, but did not manage to get an expedition organized.

== Congo ==
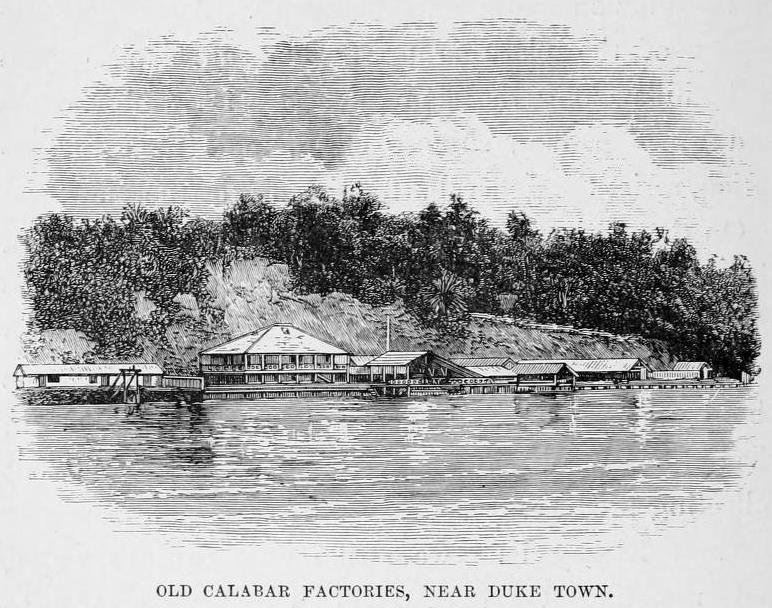
Old Calabar Factories, near Duke Town, around 1885

On 2 December 1885 Bove set out to examine the Congo River in Africa. The purpose of his mission, which was sponsored by the Ministry of Foreign Affairs, was to investigate the possibility for Italian trade on the Congo River. Bove, accompanied by Captain Giuseppe Fabrello and Enrico Stassano, left Liverpool, England, on 2 December 1885. They made a leisurely voyage around West Africa, stopping at the Canary Islands, Sierra Leone, Liberia, Accra, Keta, Lagos and Fernando Po. Bove observed that England, France and Germany were well-established, leaving little room for an Italian presence. The two Italians visited King Orok, king of Old Calabar in Duke Town, who received them while reclining on a couch.

Reaching the Congo, they sailed as far as Matadi, where they remained during the rainy season. They then traveled on foot to Stanley Pool, from where they took the steamer further inland. Bove was disappointed by the Lower Congo region, which does not have rich vegetation, and had few people and little wildlife. Eventually they reached Leopoldville, but Bove was unable to continue due to fever. He returned to Italy on 17 October 1886.

== Death ==
Bove made a pessimistic report on the potential for Italian involvement in the Congo, stressing the difficulty of the climate. Wracked with fever contracted on the Congo trip, he resigned from the navy and was made a director of La Veloce, a shipping company. Continuing to suffer severely from his illnesses, on 9 August 1887 Bove committed suicide in Verona at the age of 35.

There is a small museum named after Giacomo Bove in Maranzana, his place of birth. His publications and many unpublished manuscripts have considerable scientific and historical interest. A glacier, a mountain and a river in Tierra del Fuego are named after him, as are an island in the Yukon and the northwestern tip of Dickson Island in the Vega Archipelago. There was also a creation of a trail in the Val Grande National Park as a memorial to his legacy: the Bove Path.

== Bibliography ==
- Negri, Cristoforo; Bove, Giacomo (1880). Idea Sommaria Della Spedizione Antartica Italiana.
- Bove, Giacomo (1883). Patagonia – Terra del Fucco, mari australi. Rapporto ... al Comitato centrale por le esplorazioni antartiche. Tip. del R. Istituto de' Sordo-Muti.
- Bove, Giacomo (1885). Note di un viaggio nelle Missioni ed Alta Paranà.
- Bove, Giacomo; Fresa, Alfonso (1940). Il passaggio del nord-est: spedizione artica svedese della "Vega". Società Italiana Arti Grafiche.

== Notes and references ==
Notes

Citations

Sources

- Benson, Keith Rodney; Rehbock, Philip F. (2002-07-01). Oceanographic History: The Pacific and Beyond. University of Washington Press. ISBN 978-0-295-98239-7.
- Bompiani, Sofia (1891). Italian explorers in Africa. The Religious tract society. p. 165.
- Bonasera, Francesco (1971). "BOVE, Giacomo". Dizionario Biografico degli Italiani (in Italian). Vol. 13. Trecanni.
- Bosco, Piero (July 2006). "The Giacomo Bove Museum, Maranzana, Italy". Polar Record. 42 (3): 260–261. doi:10.1017/s0032247406215559. S2CID 131124539.
- Godley, E.J. (July 1970). "Botany of the Southern Zone Exploration, 1847–1891". Tuatara. 18 (2).
- Griffes (2007). Baltic Sea (Southern Part). ProStar Publications. ISBN 978-1-57785-762-4.
- Leslie, Alexander (1879). The Arctic voyages of Adolf Erik Nordenskiöld: 1858–1879 ... Macmillan and Co.
- Mills, William J. (2003). Exploring Polar Frontiers: A Historical Encyclopedia. ABC-CLIO. ISBN 978-1-57607-422-0.
- Mornese, Michele (2008). "Omaggio a Giacomo Bove grande esploratore italiano" (PDF) (in Italian).
- Puddinu, Paolo (2014). Un viaggiatore italiano in Borneo. Il giornale particolare di Giacomo Bove (parte I), Astigrafica
- Puddinu, Paolo (1998). Un viaggiatore italiano in Giappone nel 1873 : il Giornale particolare di Giacomo Bove, IEOKA Editore
- Nordenskiöld, Adolf Erik (1885). The voyage of the Vega round Asia and Europe: with a historical review of previous journeys along the north coast of the Old World. Macmillan and Co.
- Pettazzoi, Rattaele (1956). The All Knowing God: Researches Into the Early Religion and Culture. Arno Press. ISBN 978-0-405-10559-3.
- Proceedings of the Royal Record of Geography – Vol. V, 1883. 1883.
- Proceedings. Vol. IX. Royal Geographical Society. 1887. p. 584.
- "Vita de Giacomo Bove" (in Italian). Associazione Culturale Giacomo Bove & Maranzana.
