= Bernhard's elephant-snout fish =

Conservation status
- Data Deficient (IUCN 3.1)

Scientific classification
- Kingdom: Animalia
- Phylum: Chordata
- Class: Actinopterygii
- Order: Osteoglossiformes
- Family: Mormyridae
- Genus: Mormyrus
- Species: M. bernhardi

Binomial name
- Mormyrus bernhardi Pellegrin, 1926

Species of ray-finned fish

Bernhard's elephant-snout fish (Mormyrus bernhardi) is a species of ray-finned fish in the family Mormyridae. It is endemic to Athi-Galana-Sabaki River, Kenya; it is threatened by fishing.
