= Neobola nilotica =

Conservation status
- Data Deficient (IUCN 3.1)

Scientific classification
- Domain: Eukaryota
- Kingdom: Animalia
- Phylum: Chordata
- Class: Actinopterygii
- Order: Cypriniformes
- Family: Danionidae
- Subfamily: Chedrinae
- Genus: Neobola
- Species: N. nilotica

Binomial name
- Neobola nilotica Werner, 1919

Species of fish

Neobola nilotica is a species of ray-finned fish in the family Danionidae. It is found in the White Nile River in Sudan. It can reach a maximum length of 2.0 cm.
