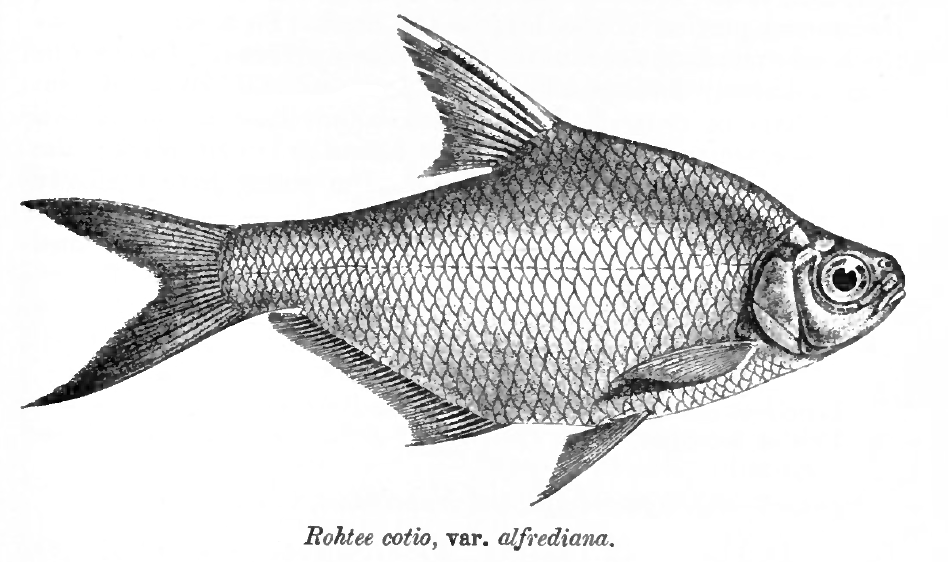

Scientific classification
- Kingdom: Animalia
- Phylum: Chordata
- Class: Actinopterygii
- Order: Cypriniformes
- Family: Cyprinidae
- Genus: Osteobrama
- Species: O. alfredianus

Binomial name
- Osteobrama alfredianus (Valenciennes, 1844)

Synonyms
- Leuciscus alfredianus Valenciennes, 1844; Osteobrama alfrediana (Valenciennes, 1844); Rohtee alfrediana (Valenciennes, 1844)

= Osteobrama alfredianus =

Species of fish

Osteobrama alfredianus, the rohtee, is a species of ray-finned fish in the genus Osteobrama. It is found in the River Salween basin in south-east Asia

== Footnotes ==
- Froese, Rainer; Pauly, Daniel (eds.). "Osteobrama alfredianus". FishBase.
