= Neobola kinondo =

Conservation status
- Vulnerable (IUCN 3.1)

Scientific classification
- Kingdom: Animalia
- Phylum: Chordata
- Class: Actinopterygii
- Order: Cypriniformes
- Family: Danionidae
- Genus: Neobola
- Species: N. kinondo

Binomial name
- Neobola kinondo Bart, Schmidt, Nyingi & Gathua, 2019

Species of fish

Neobola kinondo, the Athi sardine, is a species of freshwater ray-finned fish belonging to the family Danionidae, the danios or danionins. This species is endemic to the Tana River in Kenya. This taxon was separated from N. fluviatilis in 2019, meaning that the potentially extinct N. fluviatilis is restricted to the Athi River.
