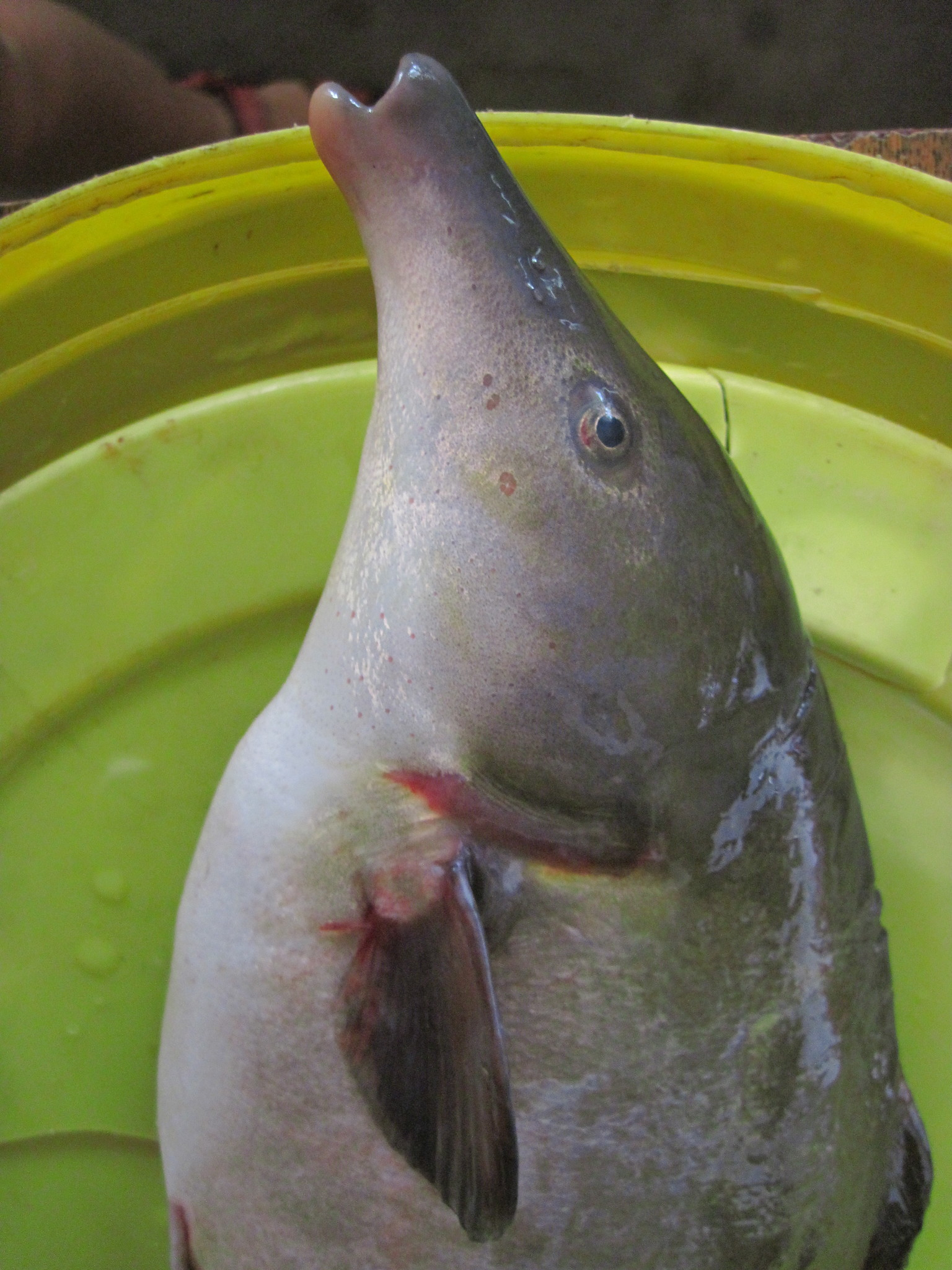

Conservation status
- Least Concern (IUCN 3.1)

Scientific classification
- Kingdom: Animalia
- Phylum: Chordata
- Class: Actinopterygii
- Order: Osteoglossiformes
- Family: Mormyridae
- Genus: Mormyrus
- Species: M. longirostris

Binomial name
- Mormyrus longirostris W. K. H. Peters, 1852

= Mormyrus longirostris =

Species of ray-finned fish

Mormyrus longirostris, commonly referred as the eastern bottle-nosed mormyrid, is a medium-sized ray-finned fish species belonging to the family Mormyridae.

== Description ==
This species grows to a maximum length of 75 centimetres (30 in) and can weigh up to 10 kilograms (22 lb). The dorsal fin is more than twice the length of the anal fin. The dorsal origin is nearer to the tip of the snout than to the caudal fin base.

== Ecology ==
It primarily feeds on weeds and insects, but also on small vertebrates, such as small fish and fish eggs. They hunt using electricity and can give a mild electric shock to defend itself.

== Range and habitat ==
M. longirostris can be found in abundance across the plains of Africa in freshwater habitats, including the lower and middle Zambezi, lower Sabi and Ludi rivers and in the Luapula-Moero-Bangwelo (Zambian-Congo system). It inhabits the Ruvuma and Rufiji rivers in Tanzania, lakes Malawi, Tanganyika and Rukwa and other eastward-flowing rivers in Tanzania.

The species lives in caves and muddy areas with soft bottoms. It hides in weeds and characteristically forms small shoals.

== Reproduction ==
Active mostly at night, it breeds during the summer rainy season, moving upstream in rivers after water has receded, with migrations at irregular intervals. Females carry 10,000–70,000 eggs at a time.

== Relationship to humans ==
The fish is harvested for food with bait and hook.

== Taxonomy ==
It was originally described by Wilhelm Peters in Monatsberichte der Akad. Wiss. Berlin, 1852.
