= International Fishery Congress =

The International Fishery Congress was a series of conferences before World War I at which representatives of countries involved in the fishing industry exchanged views.

== Precursors ==
At the International Fisheries Exhibition in London in May 1883 it was proposed to hold an International Fishery Conference. An International Fishery Congress was held in 1898 in Bergen, and another was held in Dieppe. At both of these there were unsuccessful attempts to launch the publication of an International Review of Fisheries and Fish Culture as a vehicle for communication between scientists in different countries. International Fisheries Congresses met in 1896, 1898, 1899, 1901 and in Copenhagen in 1902, where the International Council for the Study of the Sea was established.

== Conferences ==
A new series of conferences began with a broader basis at the start of the twentieth century. The First International Conference on Agriculture and Fisheries was held in Paris in 1900. It recommended setting up an international commission to regulate fisheries, but nothing was done to implement this apart from the International Bureau of Whaling Statistics founded in Oslo in 1931. The second and third Conferences were held in Saint Petersburg (1903) and Vienna (1906). The ichthyologist Borodin Nikolai Andreevich was Secretary General of the Petersburg conference.

In 1909 the United States Bureau of Fisheries hosted the fourth conference, which mainly discussed fish hatching. The fourth congress was held in Washington, D.C., on 22–26 September 1908. About twenty countries sent representatives. S.G. Worth of North Carolina presented a paper praising the freshwater grass shrimp as "a natural source of abundance and cheapness". Dr. Paul Reighard presented a paper discussing the planting of whitefish fry in the Great Lakes as a means of increasing the catch. Decio Vinciguerra represented Italy at the Fourth Congress, where he reported on the decision to undertake an "international oceanographic exploration of the Mediterranean Sea in the interest of fisheries" and asked whether the Congress approved this decision. Mr Charles E. Fryer asked whether membership of the body would be restricted to litoral countries, and Vinciguerra confirmed that all countries with an interest in the Mediterranean should be represented.

The fifth International Fisheries Congress was held in Rome in May 1911, attended by delegates of the main countries of the world. The Seventh congress was to have been held in Santander, Spain, in 1921, but was cancelled.

== See also ==
World Council of Fisheries Societies

== Notes and references ==
Citations

Sources

- Bingham, Joseph Walter; Riesenfeld, Stefan Albrecht (1938). International Law of Pacific Coastal Fisheries. Stanford University Press. ISBN 978-0-8047-0533-2.
- Boyle, Robert H. (June 1998). "The best bait of all?". Field & Stream.
- Canada. Dept. of Fisheries (1913). Annual Report. The Department.
- Ciriacy-Wantrup, Siegfried V. (1968). Resource Conservation: Economics and Policies. University of California Press. GGKEY:L5WYTJ3E67R.
- Fisheries exhibition literature. William Clowes & Sons. 1884. p. 246.
- Hays, Alice Newman (1952). David Starr Jordan: A Bibliography of His Writings, 1871-1931. Stanford University Press. p. 140. ISBN 978-0-8047-0429-8.
- "International Fishery Congress at Washington". Nature. 79 (2039): 109–111. 26 November 1908. doi:10.1038/079109a0.
- Lockyer, Sir Norman (1899). Nature. Macmillan Journals Limited.
- "Organization and Sessional Business of the Fourth International Fishery Congress" (PDF). Washington, U. S. A.: FOURTH INTERNATIONAL FISHERY CONGRESS. September 22–26, 1908.
- Smith, Tim D. (1994-07-21). Scaling Fisheries: The Science of Measuring the Effects of Fishing, 1855-1955. Cambridge University Press. p. 177. ISBN 978-0-521-39032-3.
- Wisconsin. Commissioners of Fisheries (1886). Report. 1874-1912/14.
- Zonn, I. S. (2010). The Caspian Sea Encyclopedia. Springer. p. 88. ISBN 978-3-642-11524-0.
