= Società Geografica Italiana =

Italian geographic society

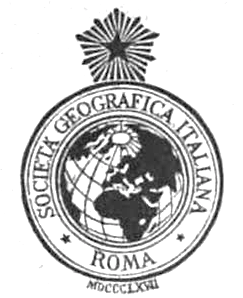
Emblem of the Società Geografica Italiana

The Società Geografica Italiana formed as a geographic society in 1867 in Florence, Italy, and moved to Rome in 1872. As of 1924 it operated from headquarters in Villa Mattei in the Celio rione. The society began publishing a journal in 1868, and also sponsored scientific expeditions, such as one to Ethiopia in 1876, led by Orazio Antinori. In 1892 its members were among the first participants of the triennial Congresso geografico italiano.

== Presidents of the society ==
- Cristoforo Negri, 1867-1872
- Cesare Correnti, 1873-1879
- Onorato Caetani, 1879-1887
- Francesco Nobili Vitelleschi, 1887-1891
- Giacomo Doria, 1891-1900
- Giuseppe Dalla Vedova, 1900-1906
- Antonino di San Giuliano, 1906
- Raffaele Cappelli, 1907-1915
- Scipione Borghese, 1916-1921
- Paolo Thaon di Revel, 1921-1923
- Luigi Federzoni, 1923-1926
- Pietro Lanza di Scalea, 1926-1928
- Nicola Vacchelli, 1928-1932
- Corrado Zoli, 1933-1944
- Roberto Almagià, 1944-1945
- Orazio Toraldo di Francia, 1945-1955
- Giovanni Boaga, 1955-1961
- Riccardo Riccardi, 1962-1969
- Ferdinando Gribaudi, 1969-1971
- Carlo Della Valle, 1971-1977
- Ernesto Massi, 1978-1987
- Gaetano Ferro, 1987-1997
- Franco Salvatori, 1997-2013
- Sergio Conti, 2013-2015
- Filippo Bencardino, 2015–present

== See also ==
- Biblioteca della Società geografica italiana (library)

== Bibliography ==
=== Issued by the society ===
- Bollettino della Società geografica italiana. ISSN 1121-7820. 1868-
- Giuseppe dalla Vedova (1904). La Società geografica italiana e l'opera sua nel secolo XIX (in Italian).

=== About the society ===
- Maria Carazzi (1972). La Società Geografica Italiana e l'esplorazione coloniale in Africa, 1867-1900 (in Italian). Florence: La Nuova Italiana. OCLC 895281639.
- Giuliano Bertuccioli (1987). "Chinese Books from the Library of the Italian Geographical Society in Rome Illustrating the Lives of Ethnic Minorities in South-West China". East and West. 37 (1/4). Istituto Italiano per l'Africa e l'Oriente: 399–438. JSTOR 29756826.
- Maria Mancini (1995). "Il fondo fotografico africano della Società Geografica Italiana". In Alessandro Triulzi (ed.). Fotografia e storia dell'Africa (in Italian). Università degli Studi di Napoli "L'Orientale". OCLC 34610996.
- Carla Ghezzi (1997). "Gli organismi geografici e di esplorazione e le origini del colonialismo italiano" [Geographical organizations and the origins of Italian colonialism]. Africa: Rivista trimestrale di studi e documentazione dell'Istituto italiano per l'Africa e l'Oriente (in Italian). 52 (1): 96–107. JSTOR 40761270.
- Daniele Natili (2008). Un programma coloniale: La Società geografica italiana e le origini dell'espansione in Etiopia (1867-1884) (in Italian). Gangemi Editore.
- Matteo Salvadore (2011). "'At the borders of "dark Africa': Italian expeditions to Ethiopia and the Bollettino della Società Geografica Italiana, 1867-1887". In Ann Caesar; et al. (eds.). Printed media in fin-de-siècle Italy. London. ISBN 9781906540746.
- Douglas Richardson, ed. (2017). "Italy: Società Geografica Italiana". International Encyclopedia of Geography. Wiley. ISBN 978-0-470-65963-2.

== Images ==
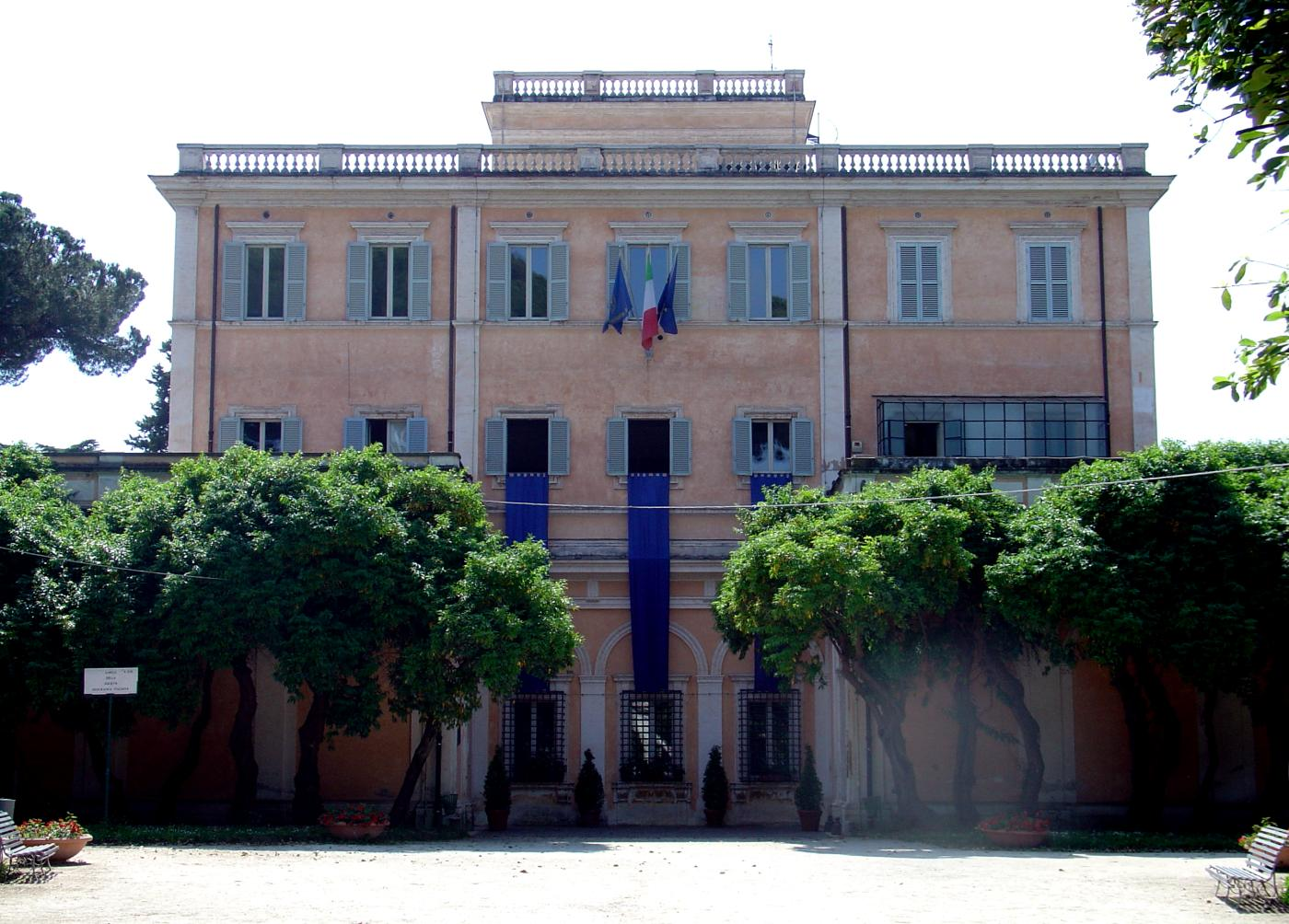
Villa Celimontana, Rome, which houses the society, 2007

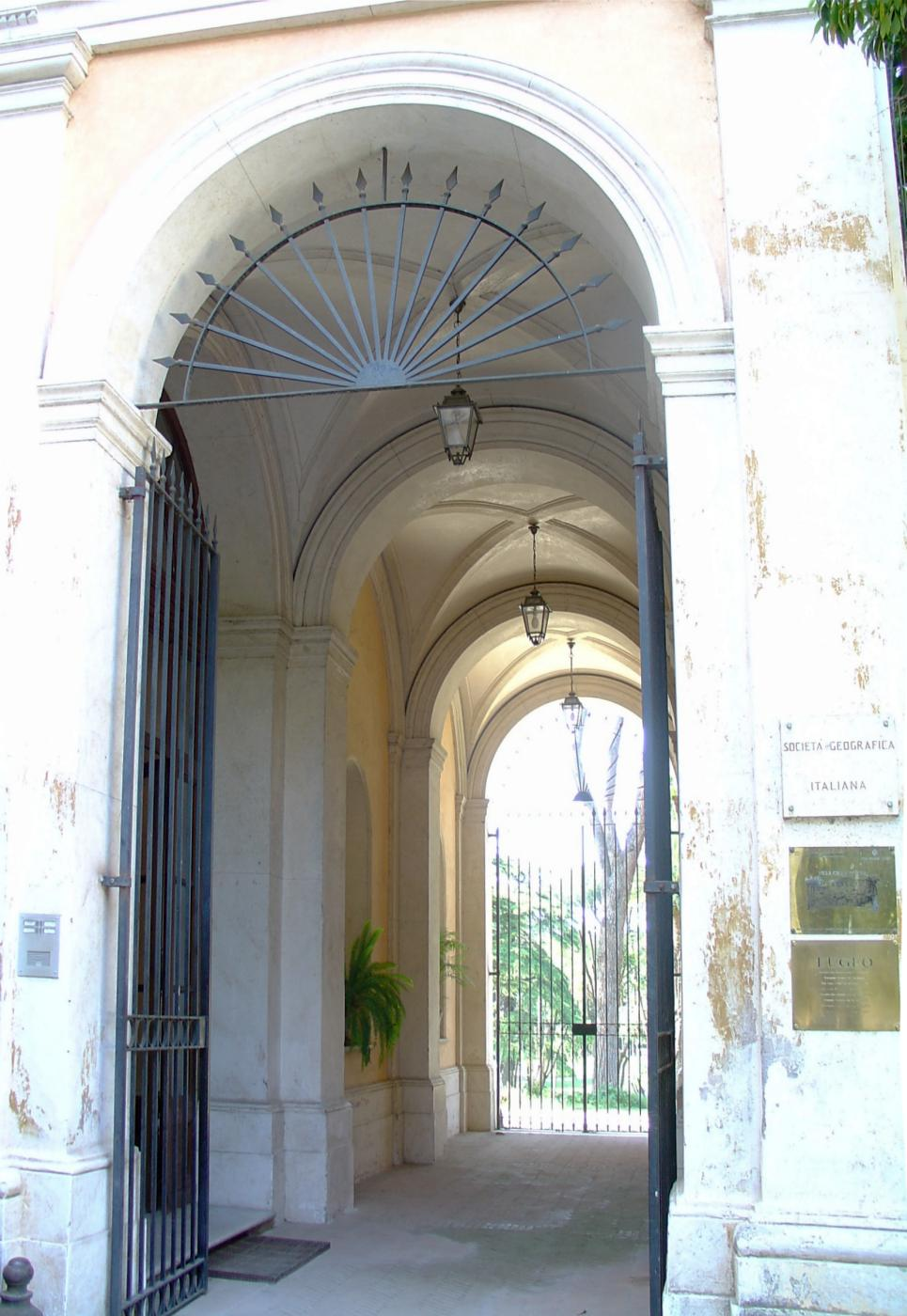
Entrance to the society's offices in the Villa Celimontana, 2007

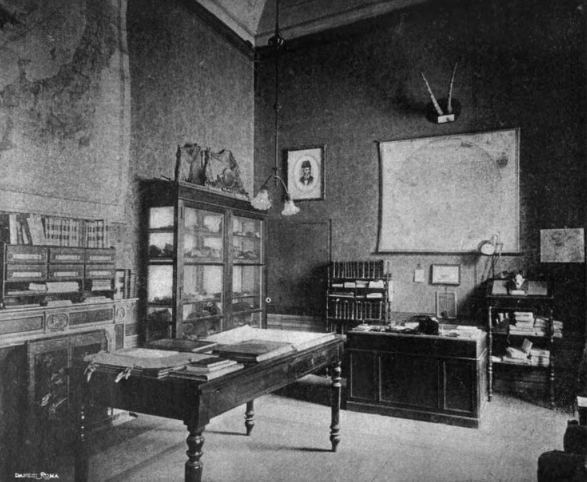
Office, 1904

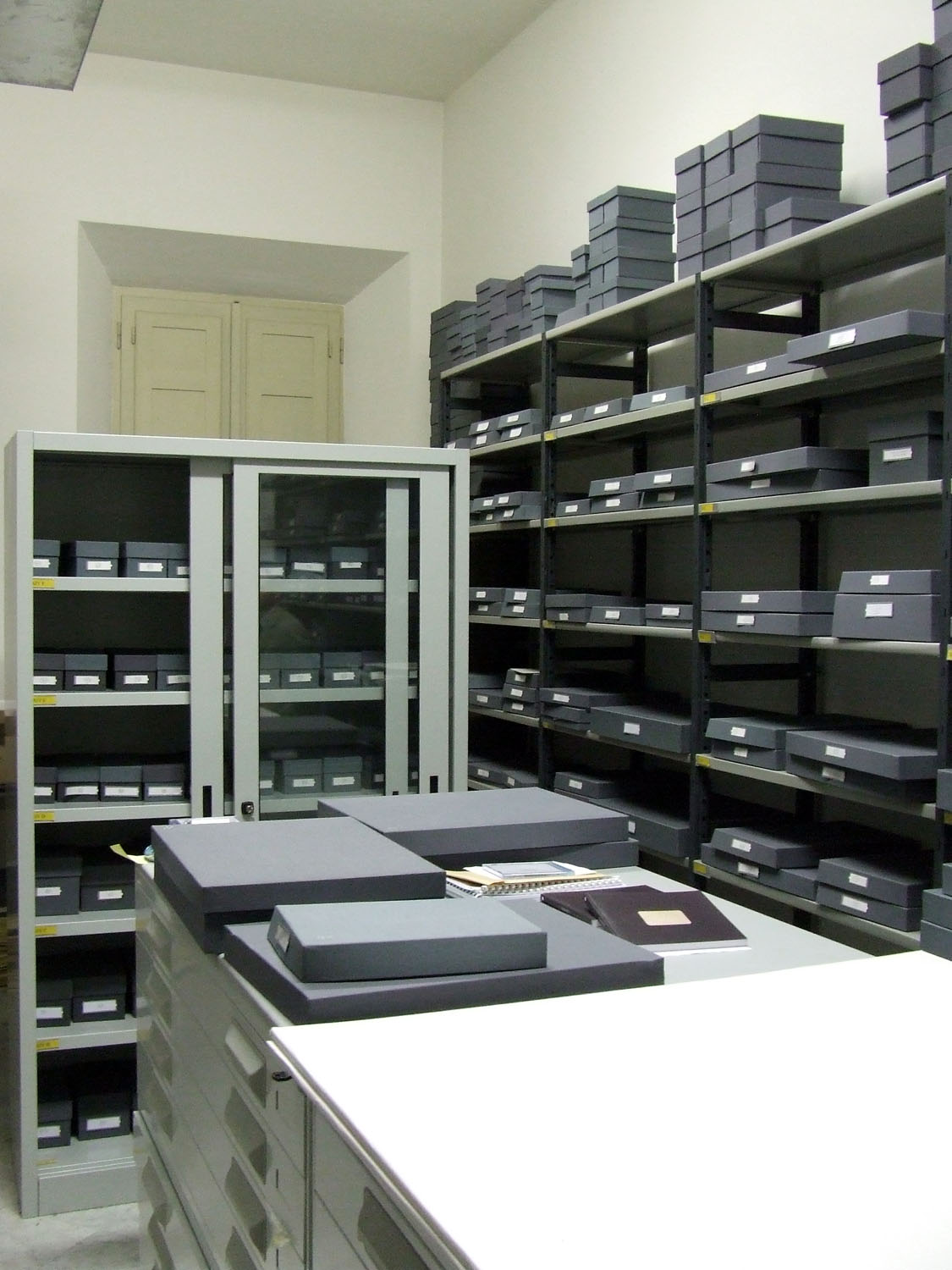
Photo archive of the society, 2007
