= Neobola stellae =

Conservation status
- Least Concern (IUCN 3.1)

Scientific classification
- Kingdom: Animalia
- Phylum: Chordata
- Class: Actinopterygii
- Order: Cypriniformes
- Family: Danionidae
- Genus: Neobola
- Species: N. stellae

Binomial name
- Neobola stellae Worthington, 1932

Species of fish

Neobola stellae is a species of ray-finned fish in the family Danionidae.

== Location ==
It is endemic to Lake Turkana in Ethiopia and Kenya.

== Length ==
It can reach a maximum length of 2.3 cm.

== Etymology ==
Named in honor of Worthington's wife Stella, a member of the expedition that collected the type specimen.
