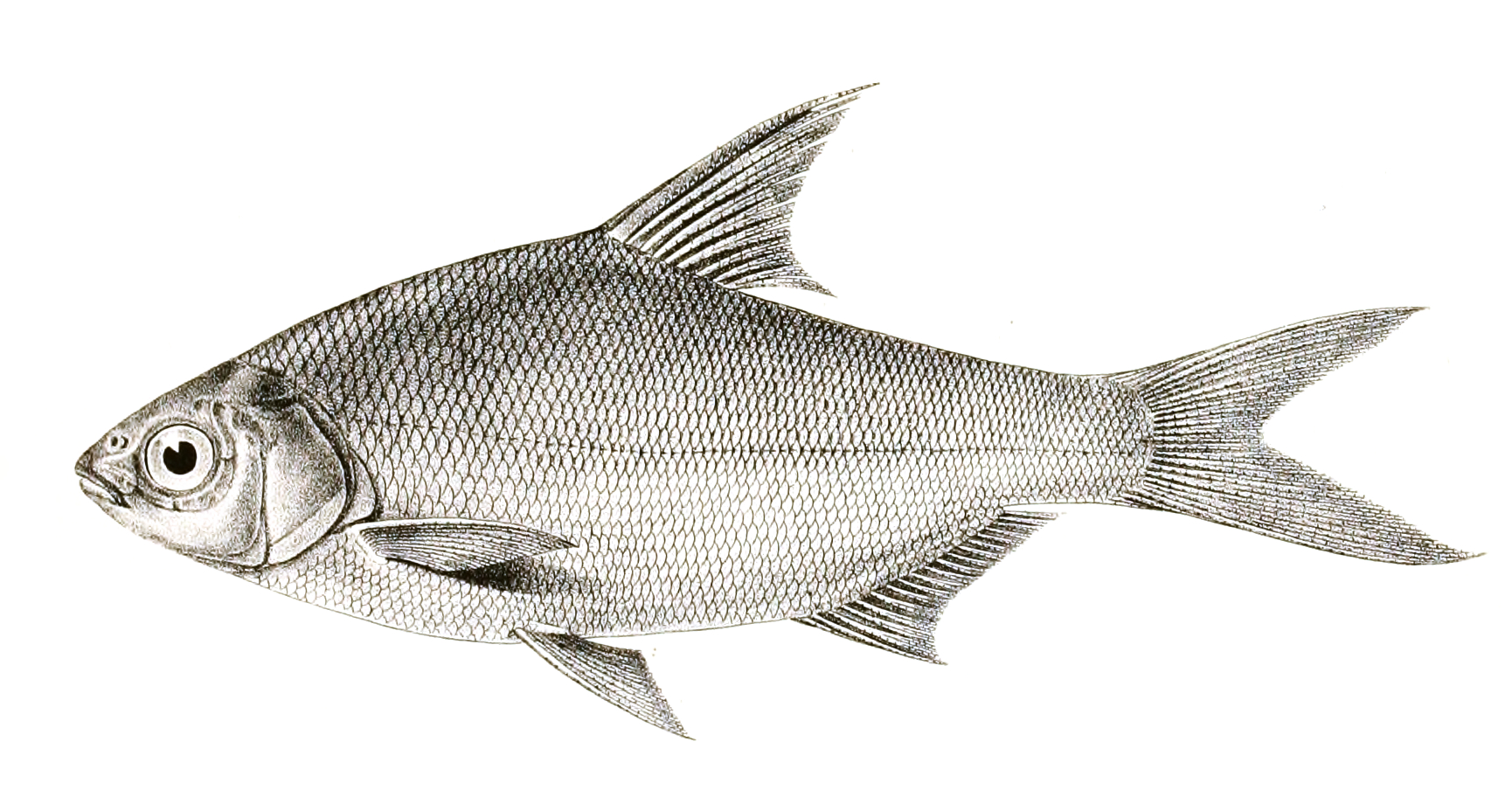

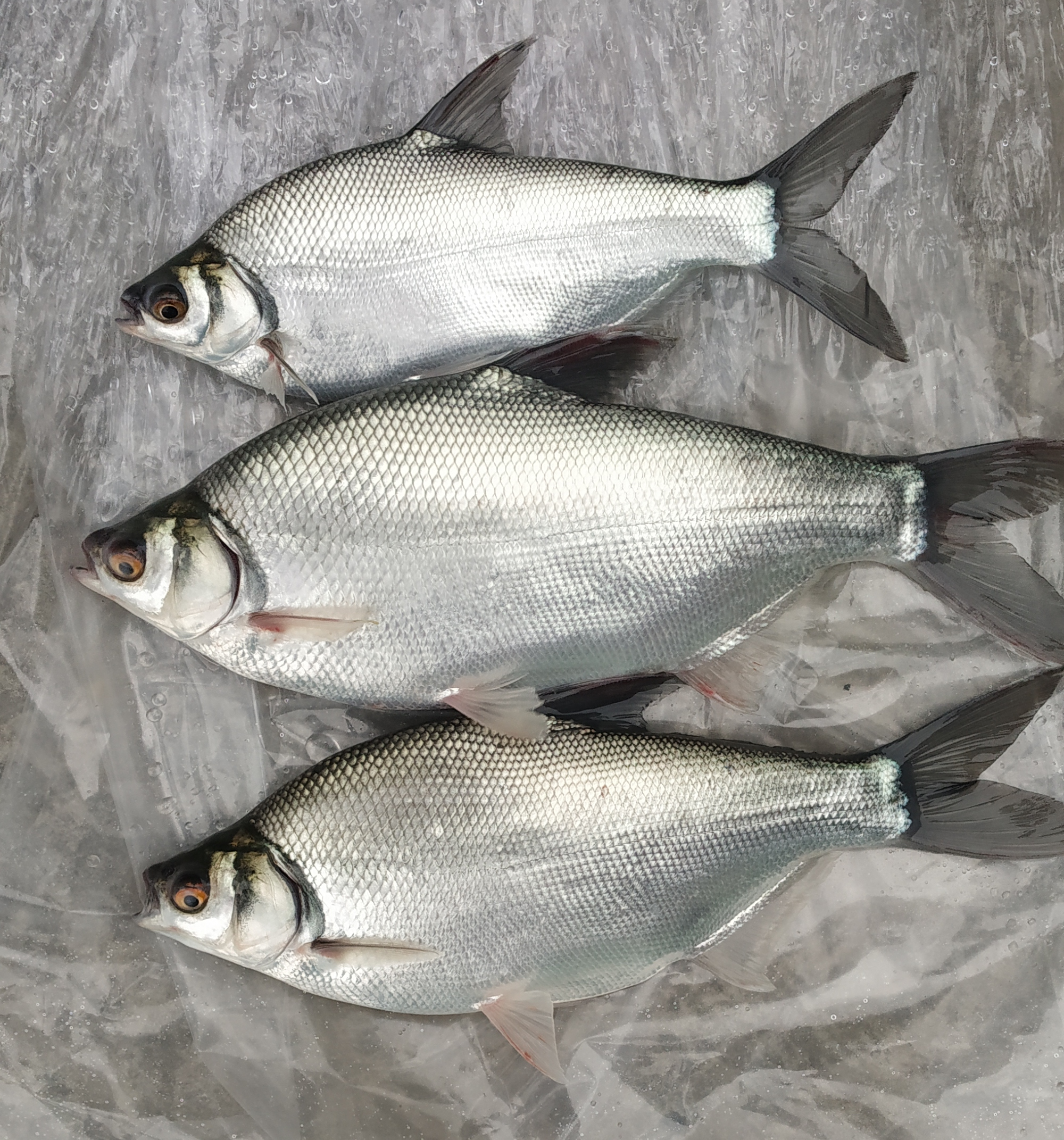

Conservation status
- Near Threatened (IUCN 3.1)

Scientific classification
- Kingdom: Animalia
- Phylum: Chordata
- Class: Actinopterygii
- Order: Cypriniformes
- Family: Cyprinidae
- Genus: Osteobrama
- Species: O. belangeri

Binomial name
- Osteobrama belangeri (Valenciennes, 1844)

Synonyms
- Leuciscus belangeri Valenciennes, 1844; Rohtee belangeri (Valenciennes, 1844); Similiogaster belangeri (Valenciennes, 1844); Systomus microlepis Blyth, 1858; Osteobrama microlepis (Blyth, 1858); Rohtee microlepis (Blyth, 1858); Rohtee blythi Bleeker, 1860; Osteobrama brevipectoralis (Tilak & Husain, 1989)

= Osteobrama belangeri =

Species of fish

Osteobrama belangeri (Meitei: Pengba) is a species of ray-finned fish in the genus Osteobrama. It was found in the Indian state of Manipur, but has been extirpated there and as of 2022 is found in the wild only in Myanmar. Farmed populations in Manipur and wild-caught fish from in Myanmar are used as food. The extirpation from Manipur was caused by dam building, habitat degradation and the introduction of alien species which caused the populations to fragment.

== Etymology ==
The fish is named in honor of botanist and explorer Charles Paulus Bélanger (1805-1881), who collected the type specimen.

== Footnotes ==
- Froese, Rainer; Pauly, Daniel (eds.). "Osteobrama belangeri". FishBase.
