= Mormyrus macrocephalus =

Conservation status
- Vulnerable (IUCN 3.1)

Scientific classification
- Kingdom: Animalia
- Phylum: Chordata
- Class: Actinopterygii
- Order: Osteoglossiformes
- Family: Mormyridae
- Genus: Mormyrus
- Species: M. macrocephalus

Binomial name
- Mormyrus macrocephalus Worthington, 1929

Species of ray-finned fish

Mormyrus macrocephalus is a species of ray-finned fish in the family Mormyridae.

== Information ==
The average length of Mormyrus macrocephalus is about 32 centimeters or 12 inches. Mormyrus macrocephalus is recorded to be of least concern to being an endangered species with no threat to its population to be identified, and there are not any conservation actions happening to help conserve the species.

== Location ==
It is endemic to Uganda. Its natural habitats are rivers and freshwater lakes. Mormyrus macrocephalus can be found in the areas of Uganda in the lakes of Kyoga and Kwania, the Victoria Nile, and the dams in the Teso district. They occupy freshwater environments.
