= Cristoforo Negri =

Italian geographer, economist and diplomat (1809–1896)

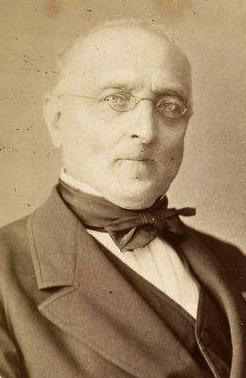
- Born: 13 June 1809; Padua
- Died: 1896 (aged 86–87); Florence
- Occupations: Geographer, economist and diplomat
- Known for: First president of the Italian Geographical Society

Cristoforo Negri (1809-1896) was an Italian geographer, economist and diplomat for the Kingdom of Sardinia.

== Biography ==
Cristoforo Negri was born in Padua in 1809. He became a professor of constitutional law at the University of Padua. Following the upheavals of 1848, he fled to Piedmont, where he was appointed to the consular division of the Ministry of Foreign Affairs by Vincenzo Gioberti. He was confirmed in this position by Massimo d'Azeglio. From 1859, he held various government posts in the course of which he visited many cities in the Mediterranean to develop Italian political and economic relationships.

In 1867, Negri was one of the founders of the Italian Geographical Society, and was the President of this society for its first four years. Commenting on the 1867 expedition of the corvette Magenta to the Pacific, Negri pointed out that it was far too heavily loaded with arms and far too short of maps, books and scientific instruments to truly be meant as a voyage of exploration. He was the Italian consul general in Hamburg from 1874 to 1875. After retiring, he continued to represent his country. He participated in the 1876 conference held by King Leopold II of Belgium on founding the International African Association, in a conference on the construction of the Panama Canal, and in the Berlin Conference of 1884-1885 in which Africa was carved up among the European colonial powers.

In 1880, Negri was again President of the Geographical Society. He endorsed a plan by the explorer Giacomo Bove to undertake a circumnavigation of Antarctica. However, the newly formed Italian state was not able to afford the cost. In 1890 he was made a senator. He died in Florence in 1896.

== Writings ==
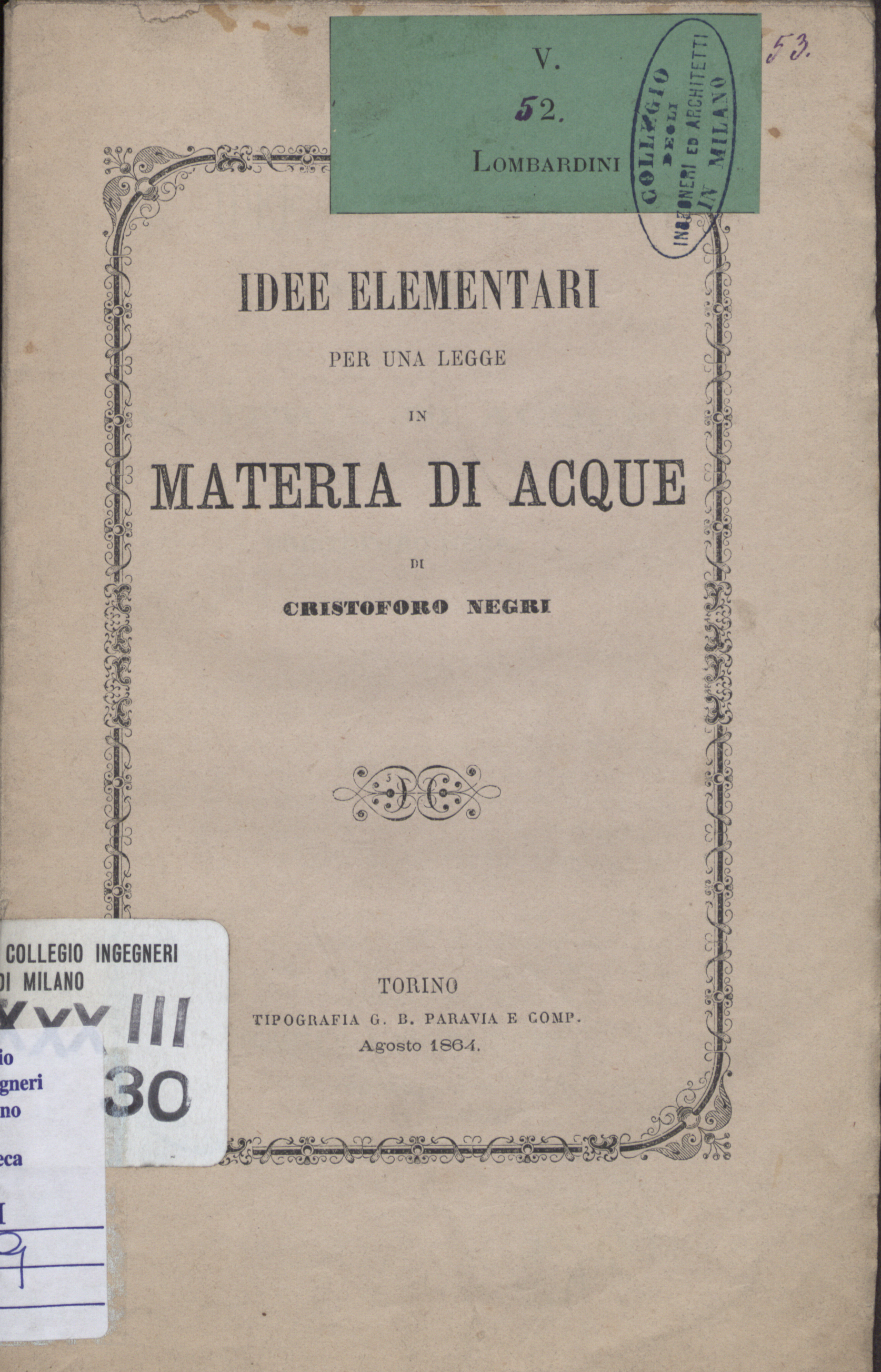
Idee elementari per una legge in materia di acque (1864)

- Negri, Cristoforo (1841). Del vario Grado d'Importanza degli Stati odierni. - Milano, Bernardoni 1841. Giuseppe Bernardoni di Gio.
- Memorie storico-politiche dei Greci e dei Romani (Historical and political memories of the Greeks and Romans), Turin, 1842.
- Negri, Cristoforo (1864). La grandezza italiana, studi, confronti e desiderii (Italian grandeur, studies, comparisons and desires). Tipografia Paravia e Comp.
- Negri, Cristoforo (1864). Memorie storico-politiche: sugli antichi greci e romani. G. B. Paravia e comp.
- Negri, Cristoforo (1864). Idee elementari per una legge in materia di acque. Torino: Tipografia G. B. Paravia e Comp.
- Negri, Cristoforo (1865). La Storia antica: restituita a verità e raffrontata alla moderna. Stamp. dell'Unione Tipografico-Editrice.
- Cristoforo Negri (1866). La Storia politica dell'Antichità paragonata alla moderna: Nuova Collezione di opere storiche. Vol. 10 - 12. Antonelli.
- Negri, Cristoforo (1867). Scritti varii (Writings). Tipografia di G.B. Paravia e comp.
- Negri, Cristoforo (1868). Relazione ... sullo stato della società geografica italiana... Stab. Civilli.
- Negri, Cristoforo (1871). Discorso del comm. Cristoforo Negri presidente della società geografica italiana: letto all'assemblea generale tenuta il 30 aprile 1871 nella sala degli arazzi del ministero della pubblica istruzione. Regia Tipografia.
- Negri, Cristoforo (1871). Due mesi di escursione alle coste belgiche, olandesi e germaniche. Tip. della gazz. d'Italia.
- I passati viaggi antartici e l'ideata spedizione italiana: Riflessi (Past Antarctic travel and concept of an Italian expedition: Reflections), Genova, Istituto de' Sordo-Muti, 1880.
- Negri, Cristoforo; Bove, Giacomo (1880). Idea sommaria della spedizione antartica italiana, proposta da Cristoforo Negri e dal sottotenente di vascello Giacomo Bove. Tip. del R. Istituto de' sordo-muti.
- Negri, Cristoforo (1882). Le memorie di Giorgio Pallavicino: considerazioni. Roux e Favale.
- Negri, Cristoforo (1864). Idee elementari per una legge in materia di acque. Torino: Tipografia G. B. Paravia e Comp.

== Notes and references ==
Citations

Sources

- Benson, Keith Rodney; Rehbock, Philip F. (2002-07-01). Oceanographic History: The Pacific and Beyond. University of Washington Press. ISBN 978-0-295-98239-7.
- Bonnier Corporation (September 1896). "Cavaliere Cristoforo Negri". Popular Science. Bonnier Corporation. ISSN 0161-7370.
- Mornese, Michele (2008). "Omaggio a Giacomo Bove grande esploratore italiano" (PDF) (in Italian).
- "Negri, Cristoforo". Treccani (in Italian). 2011.
