= Osteobrama cunma =

Conservation status
- Least Concern (IUCN 3.1)

Scientific classification
- Kingdom: Animalia
- Phylum: Chordata
- Class: Actinopterygii
- Order: Cypriniformes
- Family: Cyprinidae
- Genus: Osteobrama
- Species: O. cunma

Binomial name
- Osteobrama cunma F. Day, 1888

Synonyms
- Rohtee cunma Day, 1888; Rohtee roeboides Myers, 1924

Species of fish

Osteobrama cunma is a species of freshwater ray-finned fish from the carp and minnow family, the Cyprinidae. It occurs in the drainage of the River Chindwin in Manipur, India and Myanmar. It was formerly considered a subspecies of the more widespread Osteobrama cotio.

This species has a deep, laterally compressed body with a steep dorsal profile. 48 scales on the lateral line with 9 scale rows between the base of the dorsal fin and the lateral line and 8 scale rows between the pelvic fin and the lateral line. It has a ventral keel which runs from the origin of the pelvic fin to the anal fin, being rounded in front of the pelvic fin. It is silvery in colour shading to olive dorsally.
