= Athi elephant-snout fish =

Conservation status
- Least Concern (IUCN 3.1)

Scientific classification
- Kingdom: Animalia
- Phylum: Chordata
- Class: Actinopterygii
- Order: Osteoglossiformes
- Family: Mormyridae
- Genus: Mormyrus
- Species: M. tenuirostris

Binomial name
- Mormyrus tenuirostris W. K. H. Peters, 1882

Species of ray-finned fish

The Athi elephant-snout fish (Mormyrus tenuirostris) is a species of ray-finned fish in the family Mormyridae. It is endemic to Kenya. Its natural habitat is rivers.
