= Athi sardine =

Conservation status
- Critically endangered, possibly extinct (IUCN 3.1)

Scientific classification
- Kingdom: Animalia
- Phylum: Chordata
- Class: Actinopterygii
- Order: Cypriniformes
- Family: Danionidae
- Subfamily: Chedrinae
- Genus: Neobola
- Species: N. fluviatilis

Binomial name
- Neobola fluviatilis (Whitehead, 1962)

Synonyms
- Engraulicypris fluviatilis Whitehead, 1962

Species of fish

The Athi sardine (Neobola fluviatilis) is a species of freshwater ray-finned fish belonging to the family Danionidae.

It is endemic to Kenya. Its natural habitat is in the Athi and Tena Rivers. Studies in the 21st century have shown that this species was restricted to the Athi River near Kithimani in Kenya. This species has not been recorded since 1961 and my be extinct. The population in the Tana River is now regarded as a separate species, N. kinondo.
