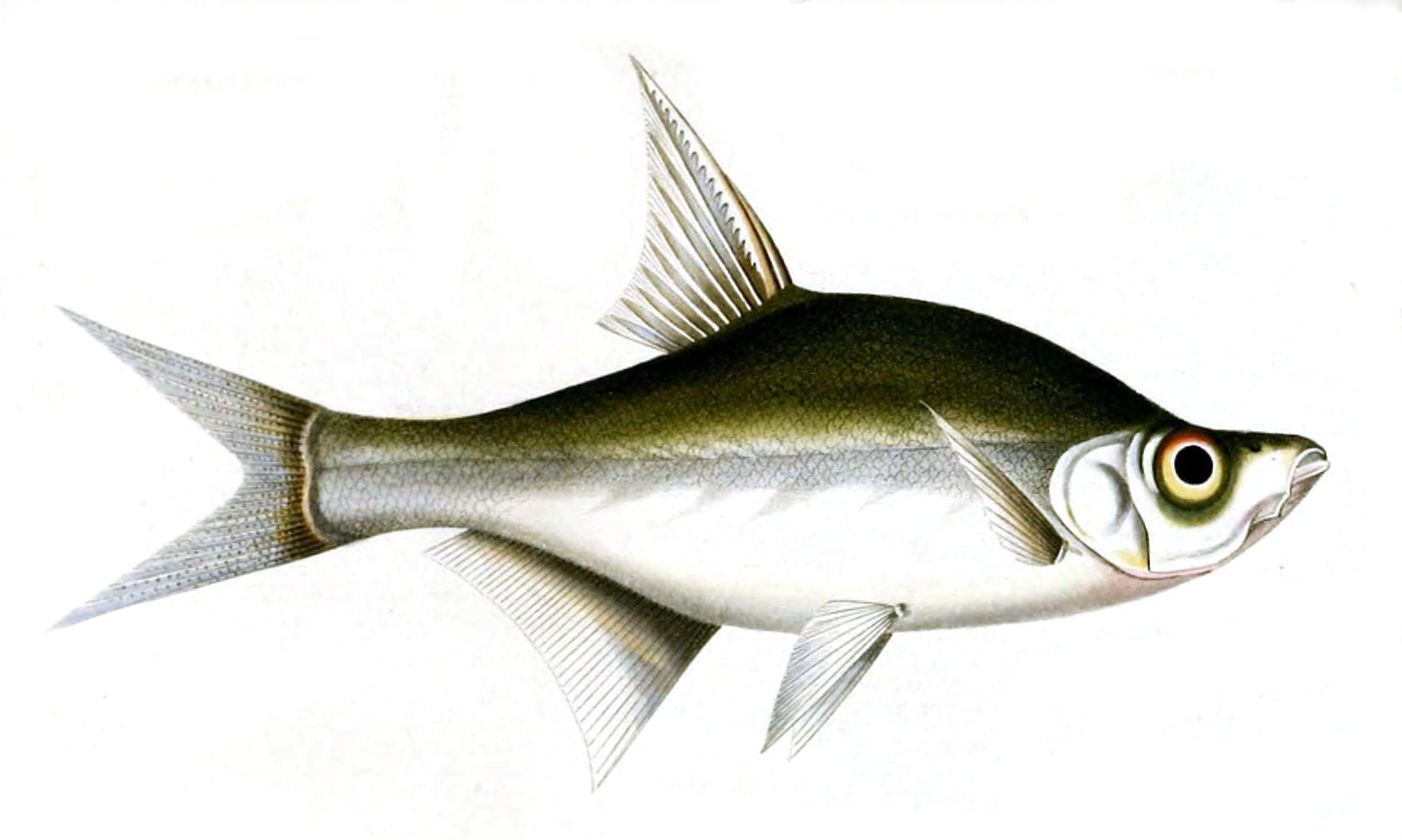

Conservation status
- Least Concern (IUCN 3.1)

Scientific classification
- Kingdom: Animalia
- Phylum: Chordata
- Class: Actinopterygii
- Order: Cypriniformes
- Family: Cyprinidae
- Genus: Osteobrama
- Species: O. vigorsii

Binomial name
- Osteobrama vigorsii (Sykes, 1839)

Synonyms
- Rohtee vigorsii Sykes, 1839; Abramis vigorsii (Sykes, 1839); Systomus vigorsii (Sykes, 1839); Rohita duvaucelii Valenciennes, 1842; Leuciscus duvaucelii (Valenciennes, 1842); Osteobrama rapax Günther, 1868

= Osteobrama vigorsii =

Species of fish

Osteobrama vigorsii is a species of ray-finned fish in the genus Osteobrama. It is known to occur in the states of Andhra Pradesh, Chhattisgarh, Karnataka, Madhya Pradesh, Maharashtra and Orissa in the drainage systems of the Krishna, Godavari and Mahanadi. It is found in fast flowing streams and rivers as well as reservoirs. It attains a total length of 30 cm and its prey is smaller fish and insects.

== Footnotes ==
- Froese, Rainer; Pauly, Daniel (eds.). "Osteobrama vigorsii". FishBase.
