= Decio Vinciguerra =

Italian physician and ichthyologist

- Born: 23 May 1856; Genoa, Kingdom of Sardinia (now Italy)
- Died: 5 October 1934 (aged 78); Padua, Italy
- Occupation: Ichthyologist
- Known for: Director of the Aquarium of Rome

Decio Vinciguerra (23 May 1856 – 5 October 1934) was an Italian physician and ichthyologist who for many years was Director of the Aquarium of Rome.

== Early years ==
Vinciguerra was born in Genoa on 23 May 1856. He studied at the University of Genoa, and in 1878 obtained a degree in Medicine and Surgery. Immediately after graduating he was appointed assistant to the Chair of Zoology and Comparative Anatomy in the University of Genoa. He was naturally attracted to zoology, which he studied further, obtaining a doctorate degree. He became a botanist and a zoologist with particular interest in ichthyology.

Vinciguerra was a member of the Italian expedition to Tierra del Fuego in 1882 led by Giacomo Bove. Although officially both zoologist and botanist, in fact Carlos Luigi Spegazzini from Buenos Aires handled the botanical work. The geologist Domenico Lovisato and the hydrologist Giovanni Roncagli made up the scientific party. Vinciguerra made valuable collections and observations of fauna and their distribution in the region. He visited Germany several times to study fish breeding, and attended conferences, mostly related to fishing, in Bergen, Vienna, Graz and Washington, D.C.

== Teaching and research ==
Decio Vinciguerra was a member of the Museo Civico di Storia Naturale di Genova from 1883 to 1931. In 1884 he made the first inventory of the fish fauna of Tunisia. In 1887 he was appointed Director of the fish breeding station in Rome, holding this position until 1921. There he undertook research into crayfish and Salmonidae. From the early 1890s he was a professor at the Sapienza University of Rome, and was also Director of the Acquario Romano. Vinciguerra also taught fish breeding in Forest Institute at the former Vallombrosa Abbey and in the Higher Agricultural Institute of Perugia.

An 1895 book on Oceanic ichthyology described Vinciguerra as one of the most active and scholarly of the naturalists of Italy. Vinciguerra was instrumental in restocking inland waters in Italy with lake trout and whitefish. He also became a recognized expert on marine fisheries. In 1901 he was sent by the Ministry to the Red Sea, at the invitation of the Italian pearl society, to perform research and observations around the Dahlak Archipelago.

In the scientific field of herpetology, Vinciguerra is known for having described three new species of lizards and one new species of snake. Also, Vinciguerra's writhing skink (Mochlus vinciguerrae) is named in his honor.

== Administration ==
Vinciguerra believed that oceanographic exploration of the Mediterranean Sea would help the fishing industry. Based on Vinciguerra's proposal, the 9th International Geographical Union in Geneva endorsed the principle of a commission in July 1908 and formed a committee that included Vinciguerra to define the organization, leading to establishment of the Mediterranean Science Commission (CIESM). Vinciguerra represented Italy at the Fourth International Fishery Congress in Washington, D.C., in September 1908, where he reported on the decision to undertake an "international oceanographic exploration of the Mediterranean Sea in the interest of fisheries" and asked whether the Congress approved this decision. Mr Charles E. Fryer asked whether membership of the body would be restricted to litoral countries, and Vinciguerra confirmed that all countries with an interest in the Mediterranean should be represented.

In 1911 Vinciguerra organized the International Congress of fishing. At the outbreak of World War I he was in Greece, where he organized fish breeding and made interesting studies on the Greek ichthyofauna. He returned to this work in Greece after the armistice. In 1920 he represented Italy at the Oceanographic Congress in Madrid, and in 1924 he represented the geographical society at the International Geographical Congress in Cairo. In 1921 Vinciguerra returned to Italy to become Deputy Director of the Museum of Genoa.

Vinciguerra died in Padua on 5 October 1934. During the course of his long career he published 210 papers on ichthyology and fisheries, bringing him wide recognition in Italy and other countries. Vinciguerria is a genus of bristlemouths in the family Phosichthyidae. It is named for Dr. Decio Vinciguerra.

== Taxon described by him ==
- See Category:Taxa named by Decio Vinciguerra

== Taxon named in his honor ==
- The catfish Exostoma vinciguerrae is named after him.

== Notes and references ==
Citations

Sources

- Beolens, Bo; Watkins, Michael; Grayson, Michael (2011). The Eponym Dictionary of Reptiles. Baltimore: Johns Hopkins University Press. xiii + 296 pp. ISBN 978-1-4214-0135-5.
- Bonasera, Francesco (1971). "BOVE, Giacomo". Dizionario Biografico degli Italiani (in Italian). Vol. 13. Trecanni.
- Coudre, Christian (2012). "Decio VINCIGUERA 1856 - 1934". Côte Bleue. (in French).
- "Decio Vinciguerra". Bolletino di Zoologia. 5 (1): 239–240. 1934. doi:10.1080/11250003409426277. (in Italian).
- Godley, E.J. (July 1970). "Botany of the Southern Zone Exploration, 1847-1891". Tuatara. 18 (2).
- Goode, G. Brown; Bean, Tarleton H. (1895). Oceanic ichthyology, a treatise on the deep-sea and pelagic fishes of the world, based chiefly upon the collections made by the steamers Blake, Albatross, and Fish Hawk in the northwestern Atlantic, with an atlas containing 417 figures. Special Bulletin of the United States National Museum. Washington, DC: Washington, Govt. Print. Off.
- "History". CIESM.
- "Organization and Sessional Business of the Fourth International Fishery Congress" (PDF). Washington, U. S. A.: FOURTH INTERNATIONAL FISHERY CONGRESS. September 22–26, 1908.
- "Vinciguerria (Genus)". ZipcodeZoo. January 2, 2010. Archived from the original on 14 June 2012.
