= Anti-Hebbian learning =

In neuroethology and the study of learning, anti-Hebbian learning describes a particular class of learning rule by which synaptic plasticity can be controlled. These rules are based on a reversal of Hebb's postulate, and therefore can be simplistically understood as dictating reduction of the strength of synaptic connectivity between neurons following a scenario in which a neuron directly contributes to production of an action potential in another neuron.

== Evidence from neuroethology ==
Neuroethological study has provided strong evidence for the existence of a system which adheres to an anti-Hebbian learning rule. Research on the mormyrid electric fish has demonstrated that the electrosensory lateral-line lobe (ELL) receives sensory input from knollenorgans (electroreceptive sensory organs) which utilize a self-generated electrical discharge (called an EOD; electric organ discharge) to extract information from the environment about objects in close proximity to the fish.

In addition to information from sensory receptors, the ELL receives a signal from the area of the brain responsible for initiating the electrical discharges, known as the EOD command nucleus. This efference copy diverges, transmitted through two separate pathways, before the signals converge along with electrosensory input on Purkinje-like Medium Ganglion cells in the ELL. These cells receive information through extensive apical dendritic projections from parallel fibers that signal the transmission of an order to release an EOD. These cells also receive information from neurons conveying electrosensory information.

Important to anti-Hebbian learning, the synapses between the parallel fibers and the apical dendrites of Medium Ganglion cells show a specific pattern of synaptic plasticity. Should activation of the dendrites by parallel fibers occur in a short time period preceding the initiation of a dendritic broad spike (an action potential which travels through the dendrites), the strength of the connection between the neurons at these synapses will be reduced. Activation by the parallel fibers in all other circumstances – including activation significantly preceding as well as any activation following the broad spike – will result in the strengthening of the synapse.

== Significance ==
Since the neurons of the ELL receive both a corollary discharge (another term for an efference copy) of the motor output commands sent to the EOD, and afferent input from the electrosensory receptors, the animal is able to eliminate predictable inputs produced by its own motor output. The system is able to filter the expected input from the EOD, while signals which are unexpected, arriving at odd intervals with regard to the motor command are effectively strengthened by the learning rule. This allows the extraction of information about objects which cause an alteration in the flow of the electric field around the fish, highlighting changes while discarding uninformative sensory inputs.

The adaptation of these synapses, though, will only increase the strength of a synaptic connection until the resulting excitation aids in activation of a broad-spike wave. As a result, if changes in external environment are consistent, the connections between the neurons previously described will reach a level at which excitation, similar to the initial state, is once again held at a threshold, so that slight changes in the incoming sensory information will result in contribution to broad-spike initiation. In this manner, the organism is able to learn to ignore redundant sensory information in the environment. The eventual desensitization to these consistencies is essential to prevent excessive noise from masking important sensory information. Numerous potential causes which could result in a consistent alteration in the reception of EOD signals include: growth, changes in water conductance (salinity), low water levels (where the shallow bottom of the body of water would interfere with electrical currents), and possibly injuries.

== Predicted application ==
Synaptic plasticity operating under the control of an anti-Hebbian learning rule is thought to occur in the cerebellum. Understanding the operation of neural learning could provide valuable insights for the treatment of cerebellar-related disorders. The knowledge could also serve a significant function in the computer-based collection of data, repeatedly adjusting to redundant inputs while emphasizing the appearance of alterations.

== Example ==
The following algorithm was proposed by (Péter Földiák, 1990). In this algorithm, there are input neurons $(x_1, \dots, x_n)$ and output neurons $(y_1, \dots, y_m)$. Each input neuron is connected to an output neuron by a weight $Q_{ij}$. Also, the output neurons are connected to each other by weights in a symmetric weight matrix $W$. The neural activation of the output neurons is defined as a fixed point of the following stable state equation:
$$y_j = f\left(\sum_i x_i Q_{ij} + \sum_i y_i W_{ij} - t_j\right)$$
where $f(t) = \frac{1}{1 + e^{-\lambda t}}$ is the logistic activation function, and $t_j$ is the activation threshold of the $j$-th output neuron.

This can be more succinctly written in matrix notation as $y = f(xQ + yW - t)$.

The algorithm is as follows:

- Take a set of input vectors.
- Initialize $Q, W, t$.
- For each input vector $x$,
  - Solve for the output vector $y$ that satisfies $y = f(xQ + yW - t)$. This can be done by integrating along the vector field $\dot y = y - f(xQ + yW - t)$.
  - Anti-Hebbian update $\Delta W_{i j}=-\alpha\left(y_i y_j-p^2\right)$. If $i=j$ or $w_{i j}>0$, then $w_{i j}$ is set to 0.
  - Hebbian update:$\Delta Q_{i j}=\beta y_i\left(x_j-q_{i j}\right)$
  - Threshold update: $\Delta t_i=\gamma\left(y_i-p\right)$.

Here, $p$, $\alpha$, $\beta$, and $\gamma$ are hyperparameters. $p$ can be interpreted as the target probability for each output neuron to be activated. If a certain input pattern $x$ is very common, the anti-Hebbian term forces its output to be very sparse. In this way, the anti-Hebbian term automatically generates efficient sparse codes, analogous to an emergent Huffman code.

== See also ==
- Hebbian theory
- Active sensory systems
- Synaptic plasticity
- Learning rule
