= Merlin Tuttle =

American ecologist (born 1941)

Merlin Devere Tuttle
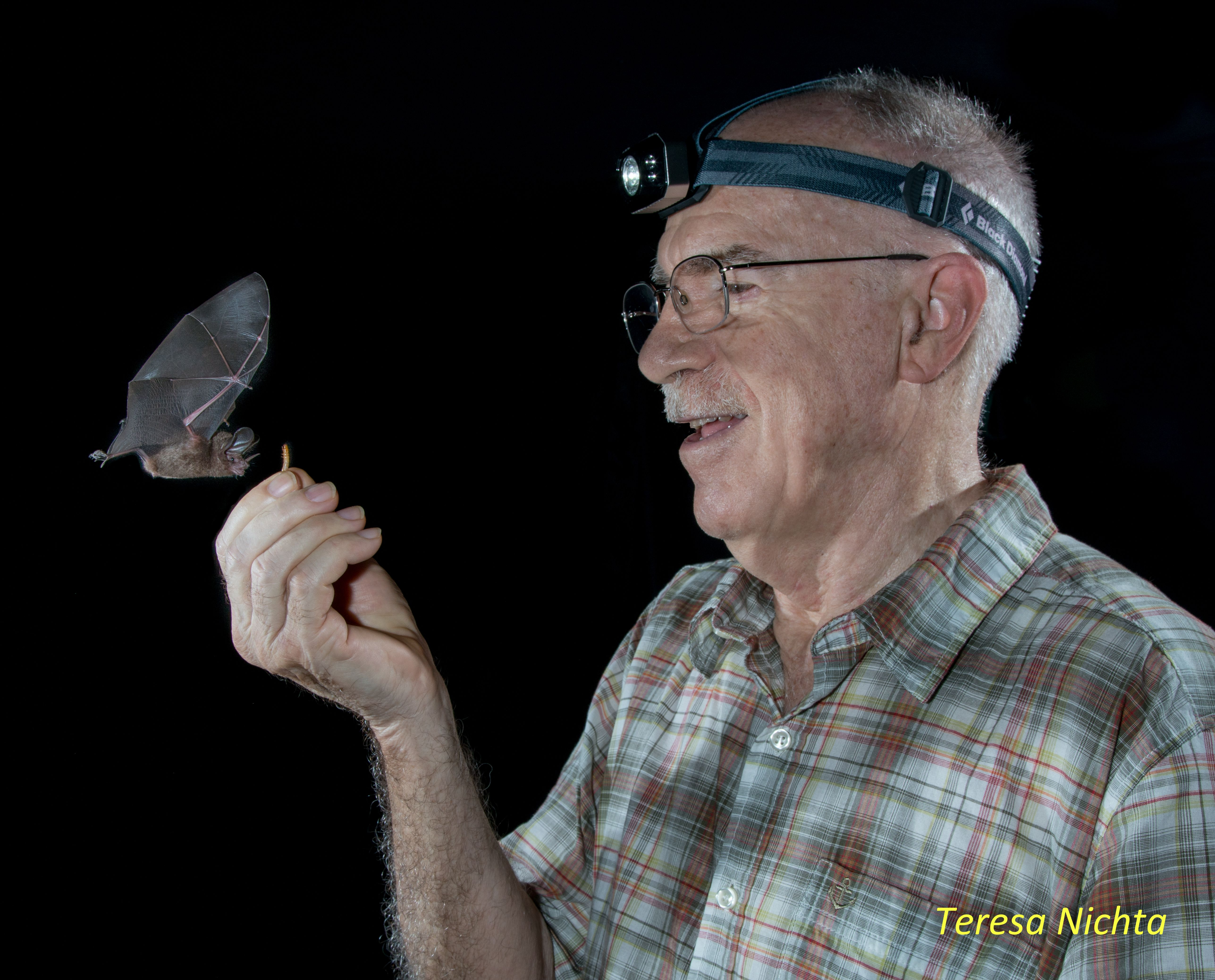
- Merlin feeding a mealworm to a little big-eared bat (Micronycteris megalotis) in Trinidad, 2016
- Born: August 26, 1941 (age 85); Honolulu, Hawaii
- Known for: Bat ecology and photography, conservationism
- Title: Founder & Executive Director, Merlin Tuttle's Bat Conservation; Founder & Former Director, Bat Conservation International; Advisory Board Member, Disney's Animal Kingdom; Former Curator of Mammals, Milwaukee Public Museum; Research Fellow, Department of Integrative Biology, The University of Texas at Austin; Co-Director, Smithsonian Venezuelan Project
- Awards: Gerrit S. Miller, Jr. Award; National Fish and Wildlife Foundation's Chuck Yeager Award; Chevron/Times-Mirror Conservation Award; Texas 77th Legislature House Resolution No. 1008 Commendation; Margaret Douglas Medal; The National Speleological Society Honorary Life Member; Honorary Doctorate Andrews University; Honorary Life Membership North American Society for Bat Research

Academic background
- Education: Andrews University (BA); University of Kansas (MA, Ph.D.)

Merlin Devere Tuttle (born August 26, 1941) is an American ecologist, conservationist, writer and wildlife photographer who has specialized in bat ecology, behavior, and conservation. He is credited with protecting the Austin Congress Avenue Bridge bat colony from extermination. Tuttle is currently active as founder and executive director of Merlin Tuttle's Bat Conservation (MTBC) in Austin, Texas.

He also founded the conservation organizations Bat Conservation International, from which he retired in 2009, and helped establish the National Park of American Samoa. Tuttle has also published research on gray bat population ecology migration, gray bat foraging habits and the frog-eating bats Trachops cirrhosus.

Tuttle's photography of bats has been featured in numerous National Geographic Society publications, including 100 Best Pictures and 100 Years of Adventure and Discovery. In 2002, the United States Postal Service released a commemorative stamp series featuring Tuttle's photographs. In 2019, Tuttle served as science editor and photographer for the Smithsonian Books publication BATS: an illustrated guide to all species. He has received accolades for his research and conservation work, including the Gerritt S. Miller Jr. Award, and has been honored by the Texas State House of Representatives.

In 2015, Tuttle published his memoir, The Secret Lives of Bats: My Adventures With the World's Most Misunderstood Mammals.

== Early life ==
External audio
- Adventures With a Bat Biologist, 12:29, To the Best of Our Knowledge

External videos
- "Merlin Tuttle shares bats with David Letterman", YouTube video
- "The importance of bats", YouTube video

Tuttle was born in Honolulu, Hawaii. According to his autobiography The Secret Lives of Bats, he has always been fascinated by nature for as long as he can remember. He was raised around Knoxville, Tennessee with his two siblings and parents Horace and June Tuttle. In April 1959 at age 17, Tuttle learned of a bat cave near his home in Knoxville. After convincing his father to venture into the cave with him, he found himself surrounded by a swarm of gray bats while climbing through a hole that served as the bat's exit route. He describes this as his introduction to the gentle nature of bats, which did not scratch or bite him as they swarmed around him attempting to exit the cave. Curious about where the bats traveled after they emerged from the cave, Tuttle repeatedly returned with his parents to watch them emerge and noticed that they disappeared for months at a time. Despite reading in textbooks that gray bats were non-migratory, he became convinced by his observations that the bats must be migrating during these periods of absence. After documenting field notes and collecting two museum-type specimens from the cave, Tuttle's mother drove him to meet with scientists from the Smithsonian's Division of Mammals in Washington, D.C., who equipped him with several thousand bat bands for him to track the gray bat movements. This experience served as Tuttle's introduction to bat research.

== Education ==
Tuttle earned a Bachelor of Arts degree in zoology from Andrews University, located in Berrien Springs, Michigan. He then entered graduate school at the University of Kansas, where he studied systematics, ecology, and evolution. His master's thesis focused on zoogeography of Peruvian bats. He obtained his Ph.D. in 1974, completing his dissertation on population ecology and migration of gray bats. He subsequently published several academic papers based on his research, as well as numerous books about bats (many of which are aimed at lay readers).

== Career ==
=== Smithsonian Venezuelan Project ===
In 1965, Tuttle was hired by the U.S. Army and the Smithsonian Institution to co-direct an expedition into the Amazonian Rainforest territory of Venezuela. The project, coordinated by Charles O. Handley, Jr., curator of mammals at National Museum of Natural History, was intended to collect a large, representative sample of Venezuelan mammals and their ectoparasites in order to study mammal-parasite-habitat relationships.

=== Ann W. Richards Congress Avenue Bridge ===
In March 1986, Tuttle resigned from his position as Curator of Mammals at the Milwaukee Public Museum in Wisconsin and relocated his fledgling conservation organization, Bat Conservation International, to Austin, which had been making national headline news for its urban bat population. At the time, the Ann W. Richards Congress Avenue Bridge bats were widely unpopular and the colony was at risk of extermination. Tuttle's public education campaign to save the bats through dispelling myths and misconceptions about their threats to the citizens of Austin was met with widespread skepticism and earned him the 1986 Texas Monthly Bum Steer Award. However, with help from a coalition of leaders in the Austin community, the Public Health Department, and news media, Tuttle's persistent education efforts successfully reversed public opinion about the bats and turned the Congress Avenue Bridge bat colony into the highly-profitable tourist attraction for the city of Austin that it is today.

=== National Park of American Samoa ===
In 1985, BCI trustees Verne and Marion Read, Paul Cox, a professor of botany at Brigham Young University and Tuttle traveled to American Samoa to investigate the decline of Samoan Flying Fox populations due to the decimation of their habitat and commercial hunting. Their work evolved into a successful two-year initiative to create the National Park of American Samoa with the aid of American Samoa Governor A.P. Lutali, Lt. Governor Eni Hunkin, Samoan chiefs and a coalition of legislators and supporters. On October 31, 1988, U.S. President Ronald Reagan signed the Samoan park bill into law, establishing the first-ever tropical rainforest protected by the U.S. National Park Service and included 8,500 acres of pristine rainforest, coastal habitat, and coral atolls.

== Selected bibliography ==
- Tuttle, Merlin (2005). America's Neighborhood Bats: Understanding and Learning to Live in Harmony with Them (2nd revised ed.). Austin, TX: University of Texas Press. ISBN 978-0-292-71280-5.
- Tuttle, Merlin; Kiser, Mark; Kiser, Selena (2005). The Bat House Builder's Handbook (2nd ed.). Austin, TX: University of Texas Press. ISBN 978-0-9742379-1-6.
- Tuttle, Merlin (2015). The Secret Lives of Bats: My Adventures with the World's Most Misunderstood Mammals. Boston, MA: Houghton Mifflin Harcourt. ISBN 978-0-544-38227-5.
- Taylor, Marianne; Tuttle, Merlin, eds. (2019). Bats: An Illustrated Guide to All Species. Washington, DC: Smithsonian Books. ISBN 978-1-58834-647-6.
- Tuttle, M.D. "Curriculum Vitae". MerlinTuttle.org.
- Tuttle, M.D. (1970). "Distribution and Zoogeography of Peruvian Bats with Comments on Natural History". University of Kansas Science Bulletin. 49 (2). University of Kansas: 45–86. doi:10.5962/bhl.part.9197.
- Tuttle, M.D. (1975). "Population Ecology of the Gray Bat (Myotis grisescens): Factors Influencing Preflight Growth and Development". Occasional Papers of the Museum of Natural History of the University of Kansas (36). University of Kansas: 1–24.
- Tuttle, M.D. (1976). "Population Ecology of the Gray Bat (Myotis grisescens): Factors Influencing Growth and Survival of Newly Volant Young". Occasional Papers of the Museum of Natural History of the University of Kansas. 57 (56). University of Kansas: 587–595. Bibcode:1976Ecol...57..587T. doi:10.2307/1936443. JSTOR 1936443.
- Tuttle, M.D. (1976). "Population Ecology of the Gray Bat (Myotis grisescens): Philopatry, Timing and Patterns of Movement, Weight Loss During Migration, and Seasonal Adaptive Strategies". Occasional Papers of the Museum of Natural History of the University of Kansas (54). University of Kansas: 1–38.
- Tuttle, M.D. (1978). "Variation in the Cave Environment and its Biological Implications". In R. Zuber; J. Chester; S. Gilbert; D. Rhodes (eds.). National Cave Management Symposium Proceedings. Albuquerque, NM: Adobe Press. pp. 108–121.
- Tuttle, M.D. (1979). "Status, Causes of Decline, and Management of the Endangered Gray Bat". Journal of Wildlife Management (44): 955–960.
- Tuttle, M.D. (1982). "Gray Bat". In D.E. Davis (ed.). Handbook of Census Methods for Terrestrial Vertebrates. Boca Raton, Florida: CRC Press. pp. 127–128.
- Tuttle, M.D. (2005). America's Neighborhood Bats: Understanding and Learning to Live in Harmony with Them (2nd revised ed.). Austin, TX: University of Texas Press. ISBN 978-0-292-71280-5.
- Tuttle, M.D. (2015). The Secret Lives of Bats: My Adventures with the World's Most Misunderstood Mammals. Boston, MA: Houghton Mifflin Harcourt. ISBN 978-0-544-38227-5.
- Tuttle, M.D.; Kiser, M.; Kiser, S. (2005). The Bat House Builder's Handbook: Second Edition (2nd ed.). Austin, TX: University of Texas Press. ISBN 978-0-9742379-1-6.
- Tuttle, M.D.; Robertson, P.B. (1969). "The Gray Bat, Myotis grisescens, East of the Appalachians". Journal of Mammalogy (50): 37.
- Tuttle, M.D.; Ryan, M.J. (1981). "Bat Predation and the Evolution of Frog Vocalizations in the Neotropics". Science. 214 (4521): 677–678. Bibcode:1981Sci...214..677T. doi:10.1126/science.214.4521.677. PMID 17839660. S2CID 5627264.
- Tuttle, M.D.; Ryan, M.J. (1982). "The Role of Synchronized Calling, Ambient Light, and Noise in Anti-Bat-Predator Behavior of a Tree Frog". Behavioral Ecology and Sociobiology (11): 125–131. doi:10.1007/BF00300101. S2CID 29430974.
- Tuttle, M.D.; Ryan, M.J.; Belwood, J.J. (1985). "Acoustical Resource Partitioning by Two Species of Phyllostomatid Bats (Trachops cirrhosus and Tonatia sylvicola)". Animal Behaviour. 33 (4): 1369–1270. doi:10.1016/S0003-3472(85)80204-9. S2CID 53160674.
- Tuttle, M.D.; Stevenson, D.E. (1977). "An Analysis of Movement as a Mortality Factor in the Gray Bat, Based on Public Recoveries of Banded Bats". American Midland Naturalist (97): 235–240. doi:10.2307/2424704. JSTOR 2424704.
- Tuttle, M.D.; Taft, L.K.; Ryan, M.J. (1982). "Evasive Behavior of a Frog in Response to Bat Predation". Animal Behaviour. 30 (2): 393–397. doi:10.1016/S0003-3472(82)80050-X. S2CID 53161327.

== Sources ==
- Allen, W.L. (2001). "National Geographic 100 Best Pictures (Collector's Edition)". National Geographic. 1.
- Barclay, R.M.; Fenton, M.B.; Tuttle, M.D.; Ryan, M.J. (1981). "Echolocation Calls Produced by Trachops cirrhosis (Chiroptera: Phyllostomatidae) while Hunting for Frogs". Canadian Journal of Zoology. 59 (5): 750–753. Bibcode:1981CaJZ...59..750B. doi:10.1139/z81-107.
- Bryan, C.D.B. (1994). The National Geographic Society, 100 years of adventure and discovery. New York: Abradale Press/Harry N. Abrams. p. 484. ISBN 0-8109-8135-1.
- Humphrey, S.R.; Tuttle, M.D. (1978). "Myotis grisescens". Rare and endangered biota of Florida. Gainesville, Florida: University Press of Florida. pp. 1–3.
- Miller, Paula. "Adventures of a Real Batman: 1966-1967". www.pkmillerwriter.com.
- National Park Feasibility Study, American Samoa (PDF) (Report). National Park Service and American Samoa Government. July 1988.
- Ryan, M.J.; Tuttle, M.D. (1982). "Bat Predation and Sexual Advertisement in a Neotropical Anuran". The American Naturalist. 119 (119): 136–139. doi:10.1086/283899. S2CID 84122867.
- Ryan, M.J.; Tuttle, M.D. (1983). "The Ability of the Frog-Eating Bat to Discriminate among Novel and Potentially Poisonous Species Using Acoustic Cues". Animal Behaviour (31): 827–833. doi:10.1016/S0003-3472(83)80239-5. S2CID 54335606.
- Ryan, M.J.; Tuttle, M.D. (1987). "The Role of Prey-Generated Sounds, Vision and Echolocation in Prey Localization by the African Bat (Megaderma cor megadermatidae)". Journal of Comparative Physiology (161): 59–66. doi:10.1007/BF00609455. S2CID 31682842.
- Ryan, M.J.; Tuttle, M.D.; Barclay, R.M.R. (1983). "Behavioral Response of the Frog-Eating Bat, Trachops cirrhosus to Sonic Frequencies". Journal of Comparative Physiology. 150 (4): 413–418. doi:10.1007/BF00609567. S2CID 37404628.
- Ryan, M.J.; Tuttle, M.D.; Taft, L.K. (1981). "The Costs and Benefits of Frog Chorusing Behavior". Behavioral Ecology and Sociobiology. 8 (4): 273–278. Bibcode:1981BEcoS...8..273R. doi:10.1007/BF00299526. S2CID 39431995.
- Stevenson, D.E.; Tuttle, M.D. (1981). "Survivorship in the Endangered Gray Bat (Myotis grisescens)". Journal of Mammalogy. 62 (2): 244–257. doi:10.2307/1380702. JSTOR 1380702.
- Taylor, Marianne; Tuttle, Merlin, eds. (2019). Bats: An Illustrated Guide to All Species. Washington, DC: Smithsonian Books. ISBN 978-1-58834-647-6.
- "The Best Wildlife Photographers of the World". Digital Photographer. 2007.
