= Hans Lissmann (zoologist) =

British zoologist

- Born: 30 April 1909; Mykolaiv, Ukraine, Russian Empire
- Died: 21 April 1995 (aged 85); Cambridge, England
- Education: Hamburg
- Occupation: Zoologist
- Spouse: Corinne Ceresole Foster-Barham

Hans Werner Lissmann FRS (30 April 1909 – 21 April 1995) was a British zoologist of Ukrainian provenance, specialising in animal behaviour.

He was elected a Fellow of the Royal Society in 1954, following breakthrough research with his assistant Kenneth E. Machin identifying the electric field generated by the African knifefish (Gymnarchus), and the uses which the fish makes of it.

He was Reader, Department of Zoology, University of Cambridge, 1966–1977, then Reader Emeritus, and Director, Sub-Department of Animal Behaviour, 1969–1977.

== Life ==
=== Early years ===
Hans Werner Lissmann was born into a wealthy German family in Mykolaiv, Ukraine, which was then part of Russia. As members of the ethnic German minority the family fell under suspicion when war broke out in 1914. Lissmann and his elder brother were sent into "internal exile" in Siberia, separated from their parents, Robert and Ebba Lissmann. At the end of the war they were permitted to return home, but by 1922 the family had relocated to Hamburg in Germany, which is where Lissmann received his school-level education.

=== Hamburg and Cambridge ===
At the end of the 1920s, Lissmann moved on to study Biology at the University of Hamburg. Next he worked under Jakob von Uexküll at the Hamburg Institute for Environmental Research. He received his doctorate in 1932 for work on the Siamese fighting fish. In 1933 he was sent with a travel bursary to the Hungarian Scientific Academy's biological research station at Lake Balaton. While he was there Germany underwent significant régime change. Lissmann rejected a government requirement that he should disseminate Nazi propaganda and instead chose to relocate again. He made his way to India. Here he obtained a stipend from the recently established Academic Assistance Council which enabled him to travel to Great Britain and to obtain, in 1934, a post in the Research Department of the Cambridge University Zoological Institute, headed up by James Gray. The focus of his research during his early Cambridge years was on the interplay between movement sequencing, the sensory organs and the nervous systems of animals.

After his emigration, the police authorities in Nazi Germany identified Lissmann as a public enemy. Early in 1940 the Reich Security Main Office included him on the Special "British" list of more than 2,000 individuals who should, as a top priority, be picked out, arrested and detained by a special detachment of SS commandos, following any successful invasion and occupation of the British Isles.

=== Electrolocation in the African knifefish ===
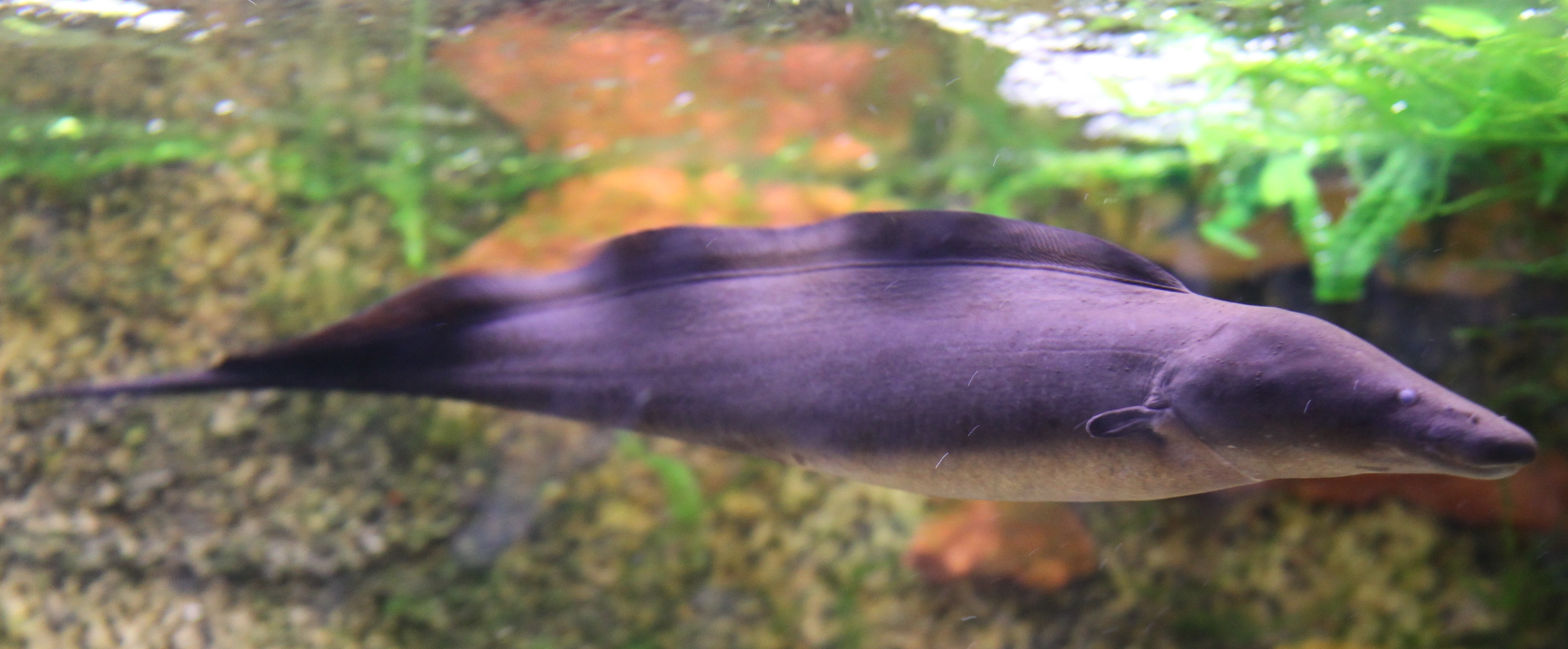
Lissman noticed that the African knife fish, Gymnarchus niloticus, could swim equally well forwards or backwards, implying a "sixth sense", which he went on to investigate in detail.

A particularly important research finding took place in 1950. The previous year, on a visit to London Zoo, Lissmann had noticed that the African knifefish (Gymnarchus) was able repeatedly to swim backwards at the same speed and with exactly the same corporeal dexterity around obstacles in its fish tank as when it swam forwards, while avoiding collision. He inferred that the fish must have what in human terms would be seen as some form of "sixth sense", something which he also thought he detected in the electric eel in another aquarium tank nearby: he thought the phenomenon might well involve electricity. Towards the end of 1949 Lissmann married, and as a wedding present from one friend he was given his own knife fish, which he now went on to study in his laboratory. He placed the fish in a large fish tank into which he inserted electrodes. With these he was able to detect a naturally occurring electric current emanating from the fish, albeit far too weak to be felt by a person. He found ways to increase the current to a point where it could be measured with a conventional oscilloscope. One story - not universally accepted - reports that the fish generated a measurably increased electrical charge when a student combed her hair beside the fish tank. The fish died soon after this, but replacements were acquired, and working with his research assistant Kenneth E Machin (1924-1988), whose PhD had covered radio-astronomy, Lissmann was able, through observation and measurement, to demonstrate that the variable electrical field was produced by the knife fish itself, and that the fish reacted to any change in the electric field around it, even when produced close to, but outside, the fish tank itself. They were helped in their work by a perspex model of an African knife fish constructed by Machin, with two electrodes attached to it permitting the perspex fish to generate an electric field equivalent to that produced by the real fish. Machin struggled and failed to produce for the perspex fish an intricate variability in the strength and shape of its magnetic field comparable to the produced by the real fish, but observations involving the perspex fish nevertheless provided a large additional amount of valuable data. A key conclusion was that the African knifefish was using changes in resistance within the electric field with which it surrounded itself to detect changes in its surroundings, and was using the information to trigger appropriate behavioural responses.

== Personal ==
Lissmann married Corinne Ceresole Foster-Barham at Cambridge in 1949. Their son Martin, an amateur flautist, became a physician in Essex.

== Works ==
- "Die Umwelt des Kampffisches (Betta splendens Regan)", in: Zeitschrift für vergleichende Physiologie, 18:1 (1932) pp 65–111.
- "Körperhaltung und Bewegungsform eines Myriopoden im Zusammenhang mit seiner Autotomie", in: Zeitschrift für vergleichende Physiologie 21 (1935), pp. 751–766.
- "Continuous Electrical Signals from the Tail of a Fish, Gymnarchus Niloticus Cuv", in: Nature, 167, 4240 (1951), pp. 201–202.
- "The Mechanism of Object Location in Gymnarchus Niloticus and Similar Fish", in: Journal of Experimental Biology, 35 (1958), pp. 451–486. (with Ken E. Machin)
- "The Mode of Operation of the Electric Receptors in Gymnarchus Niloticus", in: Journal of Experimental Biology 37:4 (1960), pp. 801–811. (with Ken E. Machin)
- "Electric Location by Fishes", in: Scientific American, 208, pp 50–59, March 1963.
- "James Gray. 14 October 1891-14 December 1975", in: Biographical Memoirs of Fellows of the Royal Society, 24 (1978), pp. 54–70.
