= Behavioral ecology (disambiguation) =

Behavioral ecology is the study of the evolutionary basis for animal behavior due to ecological pressures.

Behavioral ecology may also refer to:

- Behavioral Ecology (journal), a scientific journal
- Behavioral Ecology and Sociobiology journal
- Human behavioral ecology
