= J. Comp. Phys. =

J. Comp. Phys. may be an erroneous abbreviation for:

- J. Comp. Physiol., Journal of Comparative Physiology
- J. Comput. Phys., Journal of Computational Physics
