= Active sensory systems =

Type of sensory system

Active sensory systems are sensory receptors that are activated by probing the environment with self-generated energy. Examples include echolocation of bats and dolphins and insect antennae. Using self-generated energy allows more control over signal intensity, direction, timing and spectral characteristics. By contrast, passive sensory systems involve activation by ambient energy (that is, energy that is preexisting in the environment, rather than generated by the user). For example, human vision relies on using light from the environment.

Active sensory systems receive information with or without direct contact. Teleceptive active sensory systems collect information by directing propagating energy and detecting objects using cues such as time delay and intensity of return signal. Examples include echolocation of bats and electrosensory detection of electric fish. Contact active sensory systems use physical contact between stimuli and organism. Insect antennae and whiskers are examples of contact active sensory systems.

== Examples ==
=== Active electrolocation ===
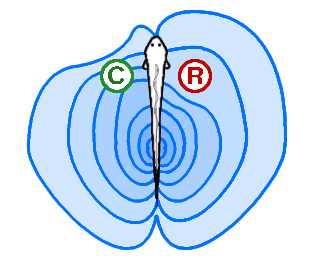
Active electrolocation. Conductive objects concentrate the field and resistive objects spread the field.

Electroreception and electrogenesis: Electric fishes probe the environment and create active electrodynamic imaging.

=== Bioluminescence ===
Bioluminescence: Adult firefly uses self-generated light to locate mates. In deep oceans, barbeled dragonfish produces near infrared light.

=== Mechanosensory ===
Active touching: Nocturnal animals depend on whiskers to navigate by gathering information about position, size, shape, orientation and texture of objects. Insects use antennae to probe the environment during locomotion. Human's reaching out to objects with hands is an analogy.

=== Echolocation ===
Echolocation: Active acoustic sensing of self-produced sounds. Bats emit echolocation calls for detecting prey in flight. Toothed whales use echolocation in water.

=== Chemical ===
Because propagation of chemicals take longer than other sources, only organisms with slow locomotion can utilize chemical signals to probe the environment. The slime mold Dictyostelium discoideum uses ammonia to probe the environment to avoid obstacles during formation of fruiting body. Deploying chemical signal is also limited by lack of return signals.

== Physical and ecological constraints ==
=== Energy propagation ===
An important constraint in teleceptive active sensory systems is generating energy with return signal above threshold of detection. Self-generated energy needs to be strong enough to detect objects at a distance. Due to geometric spreading, energy emitted uniformly will spread over a sphere of increasing surface area. Signal strength depends on the square of distance between organism and target. In teleceptive active sensing, geometric spread cost is doubled, because signal is emitted and returned. As a result, fraction of energy returned decreases as the fourth power of the distance between organism and target.

Directionality also plays a role in energy expenditure in producing signals. Increase in directionality and narrow range result in longer attenuation length. A bat has a wider detection range to target small insects flying at high velocity. A dolphin produces a more narrow echolocation beam which propagates further. Electric fishes emit signals that envelope the whole body, thus have a shorter propagation distance.

=== Attenuation ===
Attenuation: In addition to geometric spreading, absorption and scattering of energy during propagation results in the loss of energy. The attenuation length is the distance at which intensity drops to 1/e (37%) to initial intensity. Environmental factors such as fog, rain and turbulence disturb signal transmission and decreases attenuation length.

=== Length of appendages ===
For contact sensory system, only targets within reach of contact appendages are detectable. Increase in length of appendages adds physical energy costs by adding weight during locomotion and investment for growth. As a compromise, whiskers of rats cover only 35% of their body. To minimize cost, rhythmic movements are coupled with stepping mechanisms of insects.

=== Conspicuousness ===
Energy released into the environment by organisms is prone to detection by other organisms. The detection by predators and competing individuals of same species provides a strong evolutionary pressure. When active sensing is used, energy levels detected at the target are greater than those of the returning signal. Prey or predators evolved to eavesdrop on active sensing signals. For example, most flying insect preys of bats developed sensitivity to echolocation call frequency. When stimulated by a high-pitched sound, moths engage in dodging flight pathway. Dolphins can also detect killer whales' ultrasonic clicks. In return, killer whales produce more irregular, isolated sonar clicks to make less conspicuous signals. In case of barbeled dragonfish, it utilizes red light that other deep-sea fishes can't detect.

== Related concepts ==
Corollary discharge is the ability to differentiate one's own movements and responses to external motor events. Orientation and actions are mapped at the neuronal level and remembered in the brain. Corollary discharge allows one to incorporate sensory intake as a result of sensory system and serves as a feedback system.
Jamming Avoidance Response: Conspecific signals interfere active sensing of individuals sharing habitats. Electric fishes such as Eigenmannia developed reflexive shift in discharge frequencies in order to avoid frequency interference.

== See also ==
- Sense
- Sensory system
- Perception
