= Journal of Comparative Physiology B =

- Discipline: Comparative physiology
- Language: English
- Edited by: Gerhard Heldmaier

Publication details
- History: 1984–present
- Publisher: Springer Science+Business Media
- Frequency: Monthly
- Impact factor: 2.517 (2017)

Standard abbreviations
- ISO 4: J. Comp. Physiol. B

Indexing
- CODEN: JPBPDL
- ISSN: 0174-1578 (print); 1432-136X (web)
- LCCN: 90656005

Links
- Journal homepage; Online access

The Journal of Comparative Physiology B: Biochemical, Systemic, and Environmental Physiology is a monthly peer-reviewed scientific journal of comparative physiology. It was established in 1984, when it was split off from the Journal of Comparative Physiology. The editor-in-chief is Gerhard Heldmaier (Universität Marburg). The journal become electronic only in 2017.

== Abstracting and indexing ==
The journal is indexed and abstracted in the following bibliographic databases:

- Academic Search Premier
- Agricultural & Environmental Science Database
- Animal Behavior Abstracts
- Aquatic Science & Fisheries Abstracts
- Arctic & Antarctic Regions
- BIOSIS
- CAB Abstracts
- EMBASE
- Environment Index
- MEDLINE
- Veterinary Science Database
- Science Citation Index Expanded
- Scopus

According to the Journal Citation Reports, the journal has a 2017 impact factor of 2.517.
