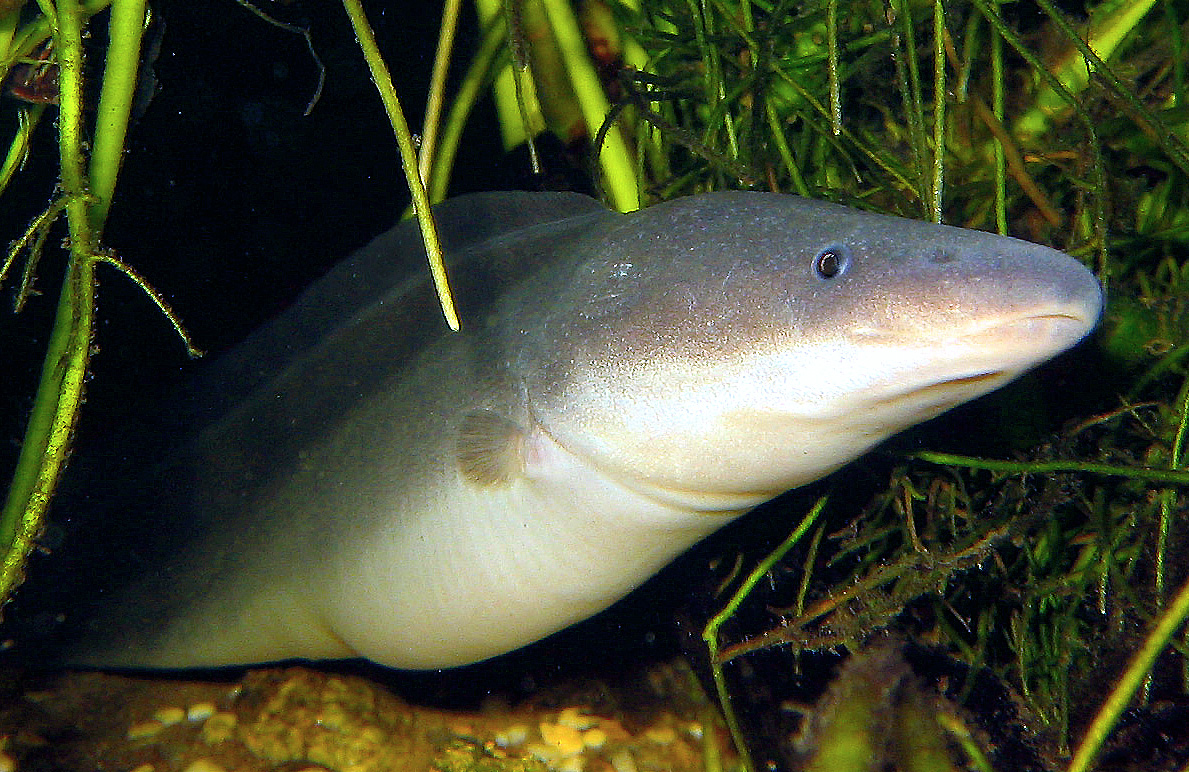

Conservation status
- Least Concern (IUCN 3.1)

Scientific classification
- Kingdom: Animalia
- Phylum: Chordata
- Class: Actinopterygii
- Order: Osteoglossiformes
- Family: Gymnarchidae; Bleeker, 1859
- Genus: Gymnarchus; Cuvier, 1829
- Species: G. niloticus

Binomial name
- Gymnarchus niloticus Cuvier, 1829
- Aba IUCN range Extant (resident) Presence uncertain & introduced

= Gymnarchus =

Gymnarchus niloticus Temporal range: Lutetian–present

Genus of ray-finned fishes

Gymnarchus niloticus – the aba, aba aba or frankfish – is an electric fish, living at the bottoms of rivers and lakes. It is the only species in the genus Gymnarchus and the family Gymnarchidae, within the order Osteoglossiformes. It is a long slender fish with no pelvic or anal fins, and a tail fin shaped like a rat's tail. It swims using its elongated dorsal fin, allowing it to keep its body straight while it moves. This in turn enables it to produce a steady but weak electric field, which it uses to locate its prey. It is large for a river fish; adults can reach 1.6 m (5.2 ft) in length and 19 kg (42 lb) in weight.

In 1950, Hans Lissmann noticed that the fish could swim equally well forwards or backwards, clearly relying on a sense other than vision. He demonstrated that it could locate prey by electroreception, making it the first fish known to have this ability.

The fish is considered good to eat in West Africa, where it has a wide but scattered distribution. It is important culturally, as it is given as a gift in community celebrations and marriages. Globally, its conservation status is 'least concern' but it faces local threats in West Africa from human activities including overfishing and pollution.

== Taxonomy ==
Gymnarchus niloticus was described by Georges Cuvier in 1829, along with the monospecific genus Gymnarchus. The monogeneric family Gymnarchidae was erected by Pieter Bleeker in 1859. The synonym Gymnarchus electricus was accidentally created by Henri Émile Sauvage in 1880, intending to write G. niloticus. The generic name is from Greek gymnos, 'naked', and archos, 'anus'. The specific name is Latin, meaning 'from the River Nile'.

The Gymnarchidae is sister to another family of weakly electric fishes, the Mormyridae; both are within the superfamily Mormyroidea. The ability to generate an electric field is shared and basal to the group.

- Mormyroidea electric organ
  - Mormyridae
    elephantfishes
  - Gymnarchidae
    Gymnarchus

The earliest known fossil remains of Gymnarchus are from the Middle Eocene (Lutetian) of Libya, although its lineage likely diverged from the Mormyridae during the Late Cretaceous.

== Biology ==
=== Description ===
Gymnarchus niloticus is a part of the ancient taxon of bony-tongue fishes (Osteoglossomorpha). It has a long and slender body, with brown/grey coloration on the top half of its body and a white underside. Four small and bony gills are present on both the left and right sides of the body, but the species is an obligate air-breather. There is a single lung on the right of the body, which arises via a slit on the right of the throat; the body is covered in small round cycloid scales. Their anguilliform swimming mode helps them swim effectively in open water as well as more viscous media like thick mud or sand.

This species uniquely has no pelvic or anal fins, while its caudal fin is shaped like a rat's tail. Its pectoral fins are small and rounded. The dorsal fin is elongated, running along the back of the fish towards the blunt, finless tail. The dorsal fin is the main source of propulsion, whereas typical fishes use their tail fin, powered by the large muscles of the back and tail, to generate thrust. This enables it to swim backwards as easily as forwards.

Adults grow up to 1.6 m (5.2 ft) in length and 19 kg (42 lb) in weight. They show signs of negative allometric growth, meaning they get slimmer as they increase in size. The larval fish has an unusual arrangement of nerves in the head.

The fish's karyotype is either 2n=34 or 2n=54 chromosomes, reported from different locations, suggesting there could be two species in the genus.

=== Electroreception ===
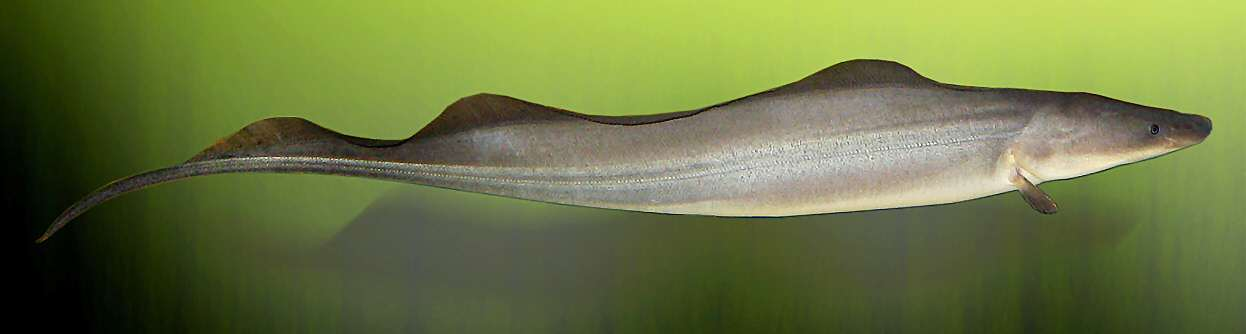
Gymnarchus swims with its back straight, propelling itself with its dorsal fin, not its tail. This allows it to generate a steady electric field to navigate and to detect its prey.

Gymnarchus niloticus is nocturnal and has poor vision. Instead, it navigates and hunts smaller fish using a weak electric field, as demonstrated by the zoologist Hans Lissmann in 1950. He noticed that it could swim equally well forwards or backward, clearly relying on a sense other than vision. This opened up research into electroreception and electrogenesis in fish. He demonstrated by experiment that it could locate prey in the dark, using only the prey's electrical conductivity. Like the related elephantfish, which hunts the same way, it possesses an unusually large brain, which allows it to interpret the electrical signals. G. niloticus makes its tail negatively charged with respect to its head. This produces a symmetrical electric field around its body, provided it keeps its back straight; it does this by swimming using its fins. This electric field enables the fish to navigate and find prey as nearby objects distort this field, and it can sense the distortion on its skin. The electric organ is derived from striated muscle in a developmental process which makes the filaments thicker, loses the striations, and creates positive and negative ends of the constituent electroplates.

Nearby fish with similar electric discharge frequencies can affect the ability to electrolocate. To avoid this, fish shift their discharge frequencies apart from each other in a jamming avoidance response. Eigenmannia, a South American electric fish, processes sensory information extremely similar to G. niloticus and likewise employs a jamming avoidance response, evolved convergently.

=== Ecology ===
Gymnarchus niloticus is predatory both as a juvenile and as an adult. Juveniles mainly catch aquatic insects and decapod crustaceans. Adults catch a variety of small prey including aquatic insects (28%) and fish (27%), with smaller quantities of copepods, shrimps, crabs, frogs, and snails. The species is bottom-dwelling and lives in fresh water.

=== Reproduction ===
Gymnarchus niloticus females possess a singular ovary and the males possess a singular testis, i.e. both sexes have unpaired gonads. The sperm cells lack a flagellum, moving like an amoeba instead. They breed in swamps during the high water season when their rivers' floodplains are under water. They build large elliptical nests up to 1.5 m (4.9 ft) across at a depth of around 1–1.5 m (3.3–4.9 ft), selecting thickly-vegetated swamps as their preferred nest sites. They use the waterside plant Echinochloa pyramidalis (antelope grass) as nesting material, available to the fish only during floods. Spawning is triggered by flooding. The female lays between 620 and 1378 eggs in the nest. The eggs, at around 4.7 or 5.4 mm (in two different populations), are the largest of any species in the Mormyroidea. The sex ratio, biased in favour of males, may help to guarantee that the small number of large eggs are fertilised. Along with Pollimyrus, the genus is distinctive among the Mormyroidea in providing parental care to its young. The adults continue to guard the young after hatching. Males are more common than females, with a sex ratio of 1:1.4.

== Distribution ==
Gymnarchus niloticus is a freshwater fish endemic to the tropical freshwaters of Africa. It is found in lakes and rivers in the Nile, Turkana, Chad, Niger, Volta, Senegal, and Gambia basins.

== Conservation status ==
The conservation status of this species is not very clear. The IUCN Red List last assessed G. niloticus in 2019, where they were listed as 'least concern'. They also claim that the current population trend for this species is unknown. While they are classified as least concern in most of the countries in Africa, Nigeria has listed them as an endangered species. The decline of this species in Nigeria is thought to be due to the destruction of habitat, unauthorized and irregular fishing practices, overfishing, and human activities near the river. A specific threat is that the young are often captured along with their parent; since they die in captivity, the population is in danger from this unsustainable fishing approach. Ongoing regional threats for G. niloticus are ecosystem stresses and habitat degradation. Causes of these may be local pollution (waste water, and agricultural and forestry effluents), natural system modifications (dams and water management/use), biological resource use (logging/wood harvesting, and fishing/harvesting aquatic resources), and climate change/severe weather (droughts).

== Human use ==
=== Food ===
With good taste and large body size with a lot of meat, Gymnarchus niloticus is a highly valued food source in several West African countries. It is often eaten raw or smoked, and the eggs (which are very large) are edible as well. Due to its rapid growth and demand, it has the potential to be a good fish for aquaculture farming.

The fish is highly valued in customary rites for community celebrations and marriages in the Yoruba culture of West Africa, as they are given as gifts from suitors to the bride's family, and to leaders during celebrations.

=== Biomimetic inspiration ===
The fish's unusual mode of swimming has inspired a biomimetic study that has resulted in a prototype undulating robotic fin called RoboGnilos, enabling detailed examination of the swimming mechanism.
