= Jamming avoidance response =

Behavior of some weakly electric fishes

Two neighboring Eigenmannia perform the jamming avoidance response: When two fish with around the same frequency meet, one fish shifts its frequency upward and the other shifts its frequency downward.

The jamming avoidance response is a behavior of some species of weakly electric fish. It occurs when two electric fish with wave discharges meet – if their discharge frequencies are very similar, each fish shifts its discharge frequency to increase the difference between the two. By doing this, both fish prevent jamming of their sense of electroreception.

The behavior has been most intensively studied in the South American species Eigenmannia virescens. It is also present in other Gymnotiformes such as Apteronotus, as well as in the African species Gymnarchus niloticus. The jamming avoidance response was one of the first complex behavioral responses in a vertebrate to have its neural circuitry completely specified. As such, it holds special significance in the field of neuroethology.

== Discovery ==
The jamming avoidance response (JAR) was discovered by Akira Watanabe and Kimihisa Takeda in 1963. The fish they used was an unspecified species of Eigenmannia, which has a quasi-sinusoidal wave discharge of about 300 Hz. They found that when a sinusoidal electrical stimulus is emitted from an electrode near the fish, if the stimulus frequency is within 5 Hz of the fish's electric organ discharge (EOD) frequency, the fish alters its EOD frequency to increase the difference between its own frequency and the stimulus frequency. Stimuli above the fish's EOD frequency push the EOD frequency downwards, while frequencies below that of the fish push the EOD frequency upwards, with a maximum change of about ±6.5 Hz. This behavior was given the name "jamming avoidance response" several years later in 1972, in a paper by Theodore Bullock, Robert Hamstra Jr., and Henning Scheich.

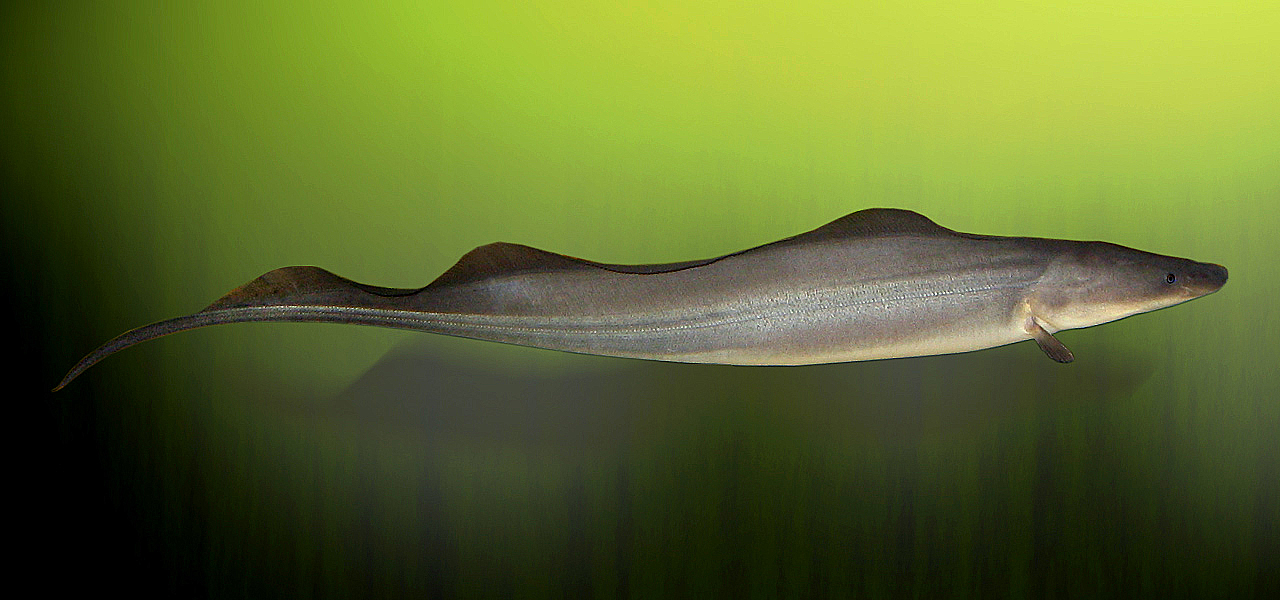
Gymnarchus niloticus also has a jamming avoidance response, evolved convergently.

In 1975, Walter Heiligenberg discovered a JAR in the distantly-related Gymnarchus niloticus showing that the behavior had convergently evolved in two separate lineages.

== Behavior ==
Eigenmannia and other weakly electric fish use active electrolocation – they can locate objects by generating an electric field and detecting distortions in the field caused by interference from those objects. Electric fish use their electric organ to create electric fields, and they detect small distortions of these fields using special electroreceptive organs in the skin. All fish with the JAR are wave-discharging fish that emit steady quasi-sinusoidal discharges. For the genus Eigenmannia, frequencies range from 240 to 600 Hz. The EOD frequency is very steady, typically with less than 0.3% variation over a 10-minute time span.

If a neighboring sinusoidal electric field is discharging close to the fish's EOD frequency, it causes interference which results in sensory confusion in the fish and sufficient jamming to prevent it from electrolocating effectively. Eigenmannia typically are within the electric field range of three to five other fish of the same species at any time. If many fish are located near each other, it is beneficial for each fish to distinguish between their own signal and those of others; this can be done by increasing the frequency difference between their discharges. Therefore, it seems to be the function of the JAR to avoid sensory confusion among neighboring fish.

To determine how close the stimulus frequency is to the discharge frequency, the fish compares the two frequencies using its electroreceptive organs, rather than comparing the discharge frequency to an internal pacemaker; in other words, the JAR relies only on sensory information. This was determined experimentally by silencing a fish's electric organ with curare, and then stimulating the fish with two external frequencies. The JAR, measured from the electromotor neurons in the spinal cord, depended only on the frequencies of the external stimuli, and not on the frequency of the pacemaker.

== Neurobiology ==
=== Pathway in Eigenmannia (Gymnotiformes) ===
Most of the JAR pathway in the South American Gymnotiformes has been worked out using Eigenmannia virescens as a model system.

==== Sensory coding ====
Eigenmannia sensory coding for jamming avoidance response. The fish avoids interference with its electrolocation signal by changing its frequency when a jamming signal is detected. This is mediated by a T-unit tuberous receptor which fires at the signal frequency, and a P-unit tuberous receptor which fires fastest near the peak of the beat cycle caused by the interference of two signals with similar frequencies.

When the stimulus frequency and discharge frequency are close to each other, the two amplitude-time waves undergo interference, and the electroreceptive organs perceive a single wave with an intermediate frequency. In addition, the combined stimulus-EOD wave has a beat pattern, with the beat frequency equal to the frequency difference between the stimulus and EOD.

Gymnotiforms have two classes of electroreceptive organs, the ampullary receptors and the tuberous receptors. Ampullary receptors respond to low-frequency stimulation less than 40 Hz and their role in the JAR is currently unknown. Tuberous receptors respond to higher frequencies, firing best near the fish's normal EOD frequency. Tuberous receptors themselves have two types, the T-unit and P-unit. The T-unit (T standing for time, meaning phase in the cycle) fires synchronously with the signal frequency by firing a spike on every cycle of the waveform. P-units (P standing for probability) tend to fire when the amplitude increases and fire less when it decreases. Under conditions of jamming, the P-unit fires on the amplitude peaks of the beat cycle where the two waves constructively interfere. So, a combined stimulus-EOD signal causes T-units to fire at the intermediate frequency, and causes P-unit firing to increase and decrease periodically with the beat.

==== Processing in the brain ====
The time-coding T-units converge onto neurons called spherical cells in the electrosensory lateral line lobe. By combining information from multiple T-units, the spherical cell is even more precise in its time coding. Amplitude-coding P-units converge onto pyramidal cells, also in the electrosensory lateral line lobe. Two types of pyramidal cells exist: excitatory E-units, which fire more when stimulated by P-units, and inhibitory I-units, which fire less when stimulated by inhibitory interneurons activated by P-units.

Spherical cells and pyramidal cells then project to the torus semicircularis, a structure with many laminae (layers) in the mesencephalon. Phase and amplitude information are integrated here to determine whether the stimulus frequency is greater or less than the EOD frequency. Sign-selective neurons in the deeper layers of the torus semicircularis are selective to whether the frequency difference is positive or negative; any given sign-selective cell fires in one case but not in the other.

==== Output ====
Sign-selective cells input into the nucleus electrosensorius in the diencephalon, which then projects onto two different pathways. Neurons selective for a positive difference (stimulus greater than EOD) stimulate the prepacemaker nucleus, while neurons selective for a negative difference (stimulus less than EOD) inhibit the sublemniscal prepacemaker nucleus. Both prepacemaker nuclei send projections to the pacemaker nucleus, which ultimately controls the frequency of the EOD.

=== Pathway in Gymnarchus (Osteoglossiformes) ===
The neural pathway of JAR in Gymnarchus is nearly identical to that of the Gymnotiformes, with a few minor differences. S-units in Gymnarchus are time coders, like the T-units in Gymnotiformes. O-units code the signal's intensity, like P-units in Gymnotiformes, but respond over a narrower range of intensities. In Gymnarchus, phase differences between EOD and stimulus are calculated in the electrosensory lateral line lobe rather than in the torus semicircularis.

== Phylogeny and evolution of weakly electric fish ==
There are two main orders of weakly electric fish, Gymnotiformes from South America and Osteoglossiformes from Africa. Electroreception most likely arose independently in the two lineages. Weakly electric fish are mostly pulse-dischargers, which do not perform the JAR, while some are wave-dischargers. Wave-discharge evolved in two taxa: the superfamily Apteronotoidea (order Gymnotiformes), and the species Gymnarchus niloticus (order Osteoglossiformes). Notable genera in Apteronotoidea that perform JAR include Eigenmannia and Apteronotus. Though they evolved the JAR separately, the South American and African taxa (boldface in the tree) have convergently evolved nearly identical neural computational mechanisms and behavioral responses to avoid jamming, with only minor differences. The phylogeny of the weakly electric fish clades, omitting non-electric and strongly-electric fishes, shows major events in their evolution. In the tree, "sp" means "a species" and "spp" means "multiple species".

- Vertebrates
  - Chondrichthyes 430 mya
    Rajiformes (skates) (~200 spp) Pulse:
  - Bony fishes 425 mya
    - - Osteoglossiformes
        - Mormyridae knollenorgans
          elephantfishes (~200 spp) Pulse:
        - Gymnarchidae knollenorgans
          **Gymnarchus** (1 sp) Wave:
      - - - Gymnotiformes ampullary, tuberous
            - **S. American knifefishes**
              (>100 spp) Wave:
          - Siluriformes
            - Electric catfish
              (11 spp) Pulse:

== See also ==
- Electric fish
- Electroreception and electrogenesis
