= Stefano Lorenzini =

Italian physician and ichthyologist

- Born: around 1652; Florence, Italy
- Education: University of Pisa
- Known for: Discovery of the ampullae of Lorenzini in sharks
- Scientific career
- Fields: Physician, Ichthyologist

Stefano Lorenzini (born around 1652, Florence, Italy — date of death unknown) was an Italian physician and noted ichthyologist. He studied medicine in Pisa and surgery at the Hospital of St. Florence Maria Nuova, with teachers including Francesco Redi, Nicholas Steno, John Fynch among other prominent scholars. He fell into disgrace with the Grand Duke Cosimo III de' Medici, who imprisoned him along with his brother Lorenzo Lorenzini, a famous mathematician.

His observations on sharks, published in Florence in 1678, was an in-depth study of the animals' anatomy and physiology, based on new mechanistic and corpuscular perspectives applied to the study of the living organism. He is most famous for the discovery of the ampullae of Lorenzini, special electromagnetic sense organs possessed by the Elasmobranchii (sharks and rays), which are located in front of the head and form a network of canals filled with gel.

== Works ==
- Stefano Lorenzini Fiorentino: Osservazioni intorno alle torpedini, l'Onofri, Florenz 1678 (online)
