= Knollenorgan =

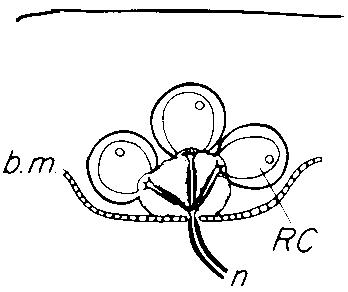
A knollenorgan drawn by the German anatomist Viktor Franz, 1921. RC=receptor cell; b.m.= basal membrane; n=nerve. Line at top=skin surface. The organ is embedded in the skin of mormyrid fishes, which actively electrolocate by generating brief electrical pulses with their electric organ. The returns from the pulses, distorted by any nearby objects such as prey, are detected by the knollenorgans distributed around the fish's body.

A Knollenorgan is an electroreceptor in the skin of weakly electric fish of the family Mormyridae (Elephantfish) from Africa. The structure was first described by Viktor Franz (1921), a German anatomist unaware of its function. They are named after "Knolle", German for "tuberous root" which describes their structure.

== Structure and function ==
Knollenorgans contain modified epithelial cells that act as sensory transducers for electric fields. Besides these, there are supporting cells and a sensory neuron. The neuron projects to the fish's brain, specifically to the nucleus of the electrosensory lateral line lobe (nELL) of the medulla via the posterior branch of the lateral line nerve.

The organs are embedded in the thickened epidermis. The receptor cells lie buried in the deeper layers of the epidermis, where they expand into a pocket in the superficial layers of the corium. The sense organ is surrounded by a basement membrane which separates corium from epidermis. Epithelial cells form a loose plug over the sensory receptors, allowing capacity-coupled current to pass from the external environment to the sensory receptor.

Knollenorgans lack the jelly-filled canal leading from sensory receptor cells to the external environment characteristic of the ampullae of Lorenzini found in sharks and other basal groups of fishes. Knollenorgans are sensitive to electrical stimuli at frequences between 20 hertz and 20 kilohertz, with electric fields as small as 0.1 millivolt per centimetre. They are used to detect the weak electric organ discharges of other electric fish, usually of their own species.

== See also ==
- Ampullae of Lorenzini – the ancestral type of electroreceptor in vertebrates
