= Behavioral Ecology and Sociobiology =

- Discipline: Ecology, ethology, sociobiology
- Language: English
- Edited by: Theo C. M. Bakker, James F. A. Traniello

Publication details
- History: 1976-present
- Publisher: Springer Science+Business Media
- Frequency: Monthly
- Impact factor: 2.980 (2020)

Standard abbreviations
- ISO 4: Behav. Ecol. Sociobiol.

Indexing
- CODEN: BESOD6
- ISSN: 0340-5443 (print); 1432-0762 (web)
- LCCN: 76647864
- JSTOR: 03405443
- OCLC no.: 39604965

Links
- Journal homepage; Online access

Behavioral Ecology and Sociobiology is a peer-reviewed scientific journal covering quantitative, empirical, and theoretical studies in the field of analysis of animal behavior at the levels of the individual, population, and community.

== Abstracting and indexing ==
The journal is abstracted and indexed in:

- Abstracts in Anthropology
- Academic OneFile
- AGRICOLA
- Biological Abstracts
- BIOSIS Previews
- CAB Abstracts
- CAB International
- Criminal Justice Abstracts
- Current Contents
- EBSCOdatabases
- Elsevier BIOBASE
- EMBiology
- FRANCIS
- GEOBASE
- GeoRef, Global Health
- International Bibliography of Book Reviews
- International Bibliography of Periodical Literature
- ProQuest
- PsycINFO
- Science Citation Index
- Scopus
- VINITI Database RAS
- The Zoological Record

According to the Journal Citation Reports, the journal has a 2020 impact factor of 2.980.
