= Journal of Comparative Physiology =

- Language: English

Publication details
- Former name(s): Zeitschrift für vergleichende Physiologie
- History: 1972–1983
- Publisher: Springer
- Frequency: 16/year

Standard abbreviations
- ISO 4: J. Comp. Physiol.

Indexing
- CODEN: JRCPA3
- ISSN: 0302-9824
- LCCN: 74644886

Journal of Comparative Physiology was a journal that split into Journal of Comparative Physiology A and Journal of Comparative Physiology B in 1984. It was the continuation of Zeitschrift für vergleichende Physiologie (ISSN 0044-362X) published from 1924 to 1972.
