= Jörg-Peter Ewert =

German neurophysiologist and researcher

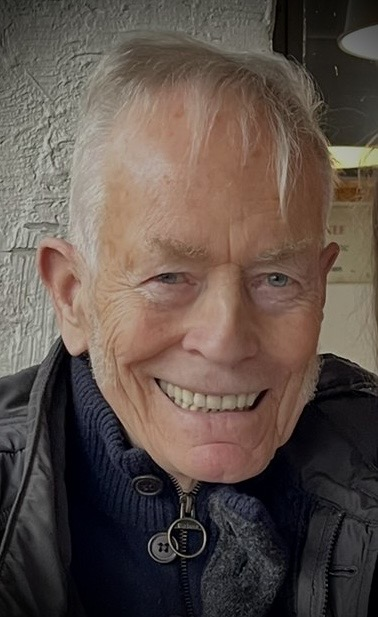
Jörg-Peter Ewert, 2022

Jörg-Peter Ewert (born 1938) is a German neurophysiologist and researcher in the field of Neuroethology. From 1973 to 2006, he served as a university professor (Chair of Zoology/Physiology) in the Faculty of Natural Sciences at the University of Kassel, Germany.

== Career ==
From 1958 to 1965, Jörg-Peter Ewert studied the specialties biology, chemistry, and geography at the University of Göttingen. He graduated in 1965 and took up the specialty of zoology under the direction of the behavior physiologist Georg Birukow. The subject of Ewert's PhD (Dr.rer.nat.) dissertation was: "The influence of peripheral sensory and central nervous system responses on the readiness of the orienting movement in the common toad". Later, he passed the state examination for the lecturing at secondary schools.

After 1966, he was a scientific assistant at the zoological institute of the Darmstadt University of Technology at Darmstadt. First, he worked under the developmental physiologist Wolfgang Luther and continued under the sense physiologist Hubert Markl. In 1968, he received an invitation from the neurophysiologist Otto-Joachim Grüsser offering him a research visit for neuron recordings at the physiological institute of the Free University of Berlin. He used the methodological knowledge acquired to begin recording neurons from the visual system of the common toad.

In 1969, he obtained his Habilitation degree, the Venia Legendi for Zoology (focus on Physiology), at the Darmstadt University of Technology.

During a research project 1970–71, he worked as a Fellow of the Foundations' Fund for Research in Psychiatry in the laboratory of the neuropsychologist David J. Ingle at the McLean Hospital (Harvard Medical School) in Belmont, MA, USA. As part of basic research, Ewert investigated neural correlates of visual threat perception in the caudal diencephalon of a lower vertebrate.

From 1971 to 1972, he worked as a university professor at the zoological institute of the Darmstadt University of Technology.

In 1973, Ewert became the chair of Zoology/Physiology at the Faculty of Natural Sciences at the University of Kassel. There he formed a Neuroethology team for research. During the foundation phase of the university, he was authoritatively involved in the construction of the students' science curricula in the biology program.

In 1983, he was offered the chair of Zoology/Physiology at the University of Vienna. However, accepting the offer of the Minister for Culture of Hesse he opted to remain at the University of Kassel and worked there until his retirement in 2006.

From 2000 to 2004, Ewert led an expert group of the Council of Europe as a representative of the European Science Foundation (ESF). The task of the Group of Experts on Amphibians and Reptiles was the revision of Appendix A to the European Convention for the Protection of Vertebrate Animals used for Experimental and other Scientific Purposes (CETS 123).

== Memberships ==
Since 1968, Ewert is a Member of the American Association for the Advancement of Science (AAAS). In 1983, the AAAS Council elected him as a Fellow of the Association as "a Member whose efforts on behalf of the advancement of science or its applications are scientifically or socially distinguished." His name was presented to the Council with the following citation: For contributions to Zoology, in particular for studies on the neural basis of behavior.

Ewert's research data, which provide novel insights into the diencephalic inhibitory control mechanisms that govern mesencephalic functions in vision in toads regarding feature detection (nervous system), attention, and memory, were discussed in the Conference on Subcortical Visual Systems held at the Massachusetts Institute of Technology (MIT), Cambridge MA, in 06-26–28-1969; cf. report in Science. Specifically, Ewert's experiments demonstrated that visual prey feature detection in toads is the result of a stimulus-dependent interaction between retina-fed excitatory processes in the optic tectum and retina-fed inhibitory input from the pretectal caudal thalamus to the tectum. The risk of a propagation of excitation in the optic tectum is likely controlled by a fine-tuned balance of excitation and inhibition, thereby ensuring optimal prey recognition and threat avoidance. Test: Lesions to the pretectal thalamus cause a systemic breakdown, leading to disinhibition and hyperexcitation in the optic tectum. This results in the elimination of essential cognitive functions, such as prey feature detection (nervous system) by tectal neurons, prey selection in the capture behavior, and avoidance of visual threats.

In 1993, Ewert was nominated for the Max-Planck-Award. In 2025, he was awarded lifetime membership to the Association for the Study of Animal Behaviour (ASAB) in recognition of his contributions to the field of neuroethology, specifically the 1983 Tinbergen Lecture.

In August 1981, Ewert, as director of the NATO Advanced Study Institute (NATO ASI), organized the International Conference of Advances in Vertebrate Neuroethology at the University of Kassel (Venue: Schlösschen Schönburg, Hofgeismar; see also conference proceedings: https://doi.org/10.1007/978-1-4684-4412-4). On the occasion of this conference, the International Society for Neuroethology (ISN) was founded. Ewert was a member of the ISN Steering Committee.

== Research in Neurobiology ==
Jörg-Peter Ewert is one of the pioneers of Neuroethology. Since 1963, he has studied the neurophysiological bases of visually controlled behavior in amphibians (Homepage), with particular emphasis on researching the common toad. His focus is on investigating neural correlates of classical ethological concepts such as "key stimulus" and "releasing mechanism".

Ewert proposed a revised concept of a case-related key stimulus. The "key" does not refer to a specific stimulus feature, but to a neural algorithm that reveals the prey category by weighting critical configurational prey feature components in comparison with non-prey cues. With his staff, he analyzed (i) neuronal circuits that translate visual sign stimuli into behavioral responses and (ii) neural loops that modulate – e.g., modify/specify – the translation.

Ewert's research in toad vision belongs to the pilot case studies in neuroethology. A research objective is the implementation of neural principles derived from toads' brains into artificial neural networks. The modeling of central nervous processes was carried out in communication with Werner von Seelen (Germany), Helge Ritter (Germany), Francisco Cervantes-Pérez (Mexico), Michael A. Arbib (USA), Ann Reddipogu (UK), and Naoto Yoshida (Japan).

In 1991, Ewert was appointed to an interdisciplinary priority program of the Federal Ministry of Research and Technology (BMFT) entitled Sensory-Motor Coordination of Robot-Assisted Movements with Neural Networks (SEKON), which was supported by the German Aerospace Research and Technology Center (DLR). An experimental platform for a joint basic science project in the field of computer-brain interface research — involving experts from neuroethology, neuroinformatics, and neuroengineering/robotics — was the subject of the scientific film: Image Processing in the Visual System of the Common Toad: Behavior, Brain Function, Artificial Neuronal Net. [Video: https://av.tib.eu/media/15148]. The Board of the International Association for Media in Science (IAMS) declared that: "The programme 'Image Processing in the Visual System of the Common Toad, produced by Institut für den Wissenschaftlichen Film Göttingen' has been judged to be of outstanding quality and thus entitled to bear the accolade: Accredited by IAMS."

== See also ==
- Vision in toads
- Neuroethology
- Feature detection (nervous system)
