= Vision in toads =

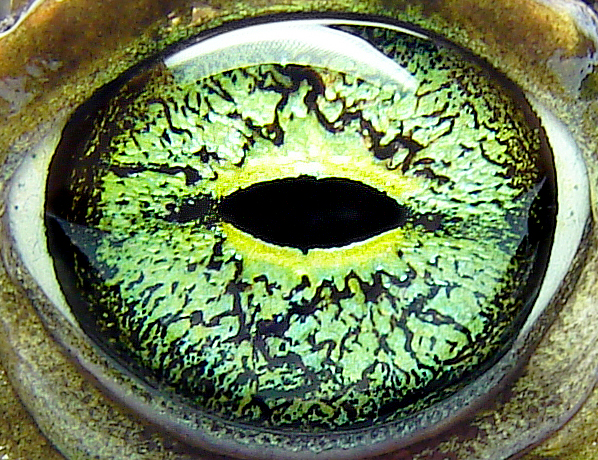
The eye of a toad

'Vision in Toads' provides detailed information and factual summaries regarding the neural correlates of visually guided prey catching and threat avoidance behavior (neuroethology) in a phylogenetically basal terrestrial vertebrate species. It sheds light on central themes such as visual feature recognition, the 'go functions' of coded triggering systems, the generation of behavioral patterns, as well as their modification through individual experience. At the same time, it provides historical context, key figures, and concepts of evolutionary perspectives. For example, evolution has endowed the phylogenetically basal anuran brain for configurational pattern recognition with the ability to detect the orientation of moving visual contrast boundaries by implicit computation using an intelligent, efficient algorithm — thereby bypassing an explicit method that takes advantage of the immense neuroarchitecture characteristic of the striate cortex in mammals (see also: feature detection (nervous system)).

Since the 1960s, Jörg-Peter Ewert and his research group have been conducting studies with the common toad Bufo b. bufo (L.) to investigate in depth the neural basis of visually guided prey recognition and the distinction between prey and enemy. The neurobehavioral analysis of the toad's visual system has become one of the 'models' in vertebrate neuroethology. This example has received constructive feedback from distinguished authorities in this field, who have offered valuable insights from various perspectives in an Open Peer Commentary in the journal Behavioral and Brain Sciences, see also Viewpoint in Trends in Neurosciences.

Ewert's work yielded several important discoveries. In general, his research revealed the specific neural circuits for recognition of complex visual stimuli. Specifically, he identified two interacting —serial and parallel information processing— regions of the brain, the mesencephalic optic tectum and the diencephalic pretectal thalamic region, that were responsible for discriminating prey from non-prey and revealed the neural pathways that connect them. Furthermore, he found that the neural mechanisms are plastic and adaptable to varying environments and conditions (e.g., discussed by Carew and Zupanc).

This article is dedicated to the Zeitschrift für vergleichende Physiologie (later renamed Journal of Comparative Physiology A JCPA) on the occasion of its centennial anniversary. Of all the publications by Ewert and his coworkers on the neuroethology of visually guided behaviors in toads and frogs, a total of 47 research papers have appeared in the Z. vgl. Physiol. and JCPA since 1967.

== Natural toad behavior ==
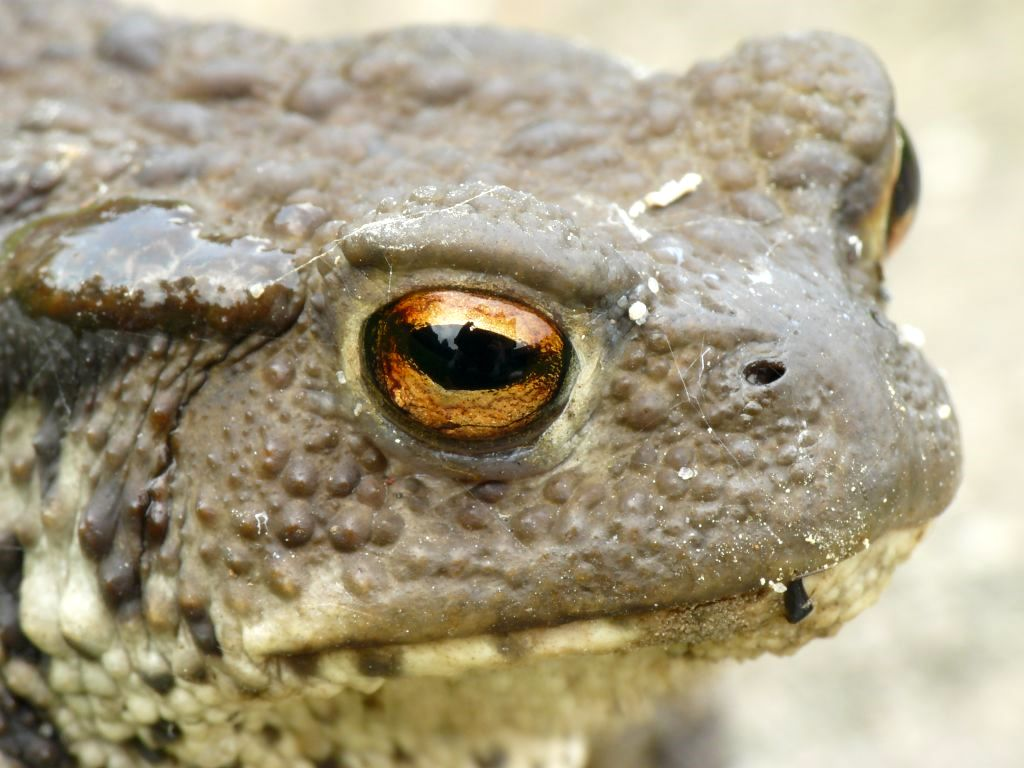
Bufo bufo

Vision in toads is a complex matter. Toads respond to objects depending on: a) what they see (recognizing the object; e.g., prey?), b) where the object is located in the visual field (localizing the object; e.g., choice of capture strategy?), and c) the toad's motivation, i.e. its interest, which can be influenced by endogeneous factors such as hunger, the time of day, and season, as well as event-related individual experiences.

Common toads Bufo bufo bufo (L.) are mainly active at dusk and dawn. In toads, rod photoreceptors —which are responsible for twilight vision— are partly involved in color vision: At the absolute visual threshold, their peculiar retinal dual rod system enables a blue-sensitive and green-sensitive limited color perception which may help toads to navigate their environment, especially in the mating season. Chromatic mechanisms determine social interactions of toads during mate choice, as neuroethologist S.L. Kondrashev and his research group have convincingly demonstrated by studying the mating behavior of male toads, which showed a preference for bluish in response to color pairs displayed on an LCD monitor. During prey-catching and threat-avoidance behaviors, however, toads rely on the perception of movement, contrast, size, and configuration (gestalt) of objects. Their perfect discrimination of configural features of contrast boundaries remains unchanged with respect to changes in color.

Toads' annual life cycle is divided into different seasonal periods: winter for hibernation, spring for mating, summer for prey hunting as well as threat avoiding, and fall for migration to wintering grounds. In spring, when the nighttime temperature no longer drops below 6 °C, the time has come for multisensory perception that allows common toads to interact socially in search of mates. They leave the soft forest floor, where they had burrowed up to 50 cm deep to hibernate, and then embark on a migration of almost 600 m per day over up to 5 km to their spawning grounds, where they grew up. During migration, the smaller males grab the heavier females as they pass by and cling to them, riding on their backs to reach the pond where mating takes place after several males have fought over each female.

In the context of a main season, behavioral objectives and their underlying motivations are commensurate. However, a high level of motivation can substantially influence the attribution of a visual object to a particular meaning category and vice versa. For example, during the mating season, male common toads are attracted to the large swollen bodies of the females, which are suitable for grasping and carrying a male in piggyback mode. In the event of a male, driven by testosterone eager to mate cannot find a female in the pond quickly, it will even utilize an oversize piece of floating tree bark as a substitute by intensely clasping it. Their sensory organs now focus on tactile sensations of their body skin and on communication through mating calls, while vision does not yet play a dominant role.

The term arousal characterizes the behavior of toads during the mating season and refers to a physiological state that promotes 'sensory vigilance.' The migration to their spawning grounds is the result of a complex interplay of various factors, not all of which are yet understood, such as how they do navigate at night in the rain. A special brain structure, the reticular formation, plays a prominent role. It integrates sensory information provided, for example, through the mesencephalic optic tectal and the somatosensory subtectal and tegmental layers. Olfactory information collected by the main olfactory bulb, associated and stored in the medial pallium of the telencephalon, is used for local orientation and pathfinding. In this scenario, the pituitary/hypothalamic system exerts significant functions by linking endocrine, sensory, and behavioral signals to the seasonal environmental events.

In the laboratory, the neuronal activity of this multisensory event can be studied in the visual system of a toad's brain. Using a microelectrode, the discharges of individual neurons (action potentials) are recorded from the layers of the mesencephalic optic tectum, subtectum, and tegmentum —following electronic amplification of the spikes, noise filtering, acoustic monitoring via a loudspeaker, and visualization on the screen of a storage oscilloscope. The input from the retina, that arrives in the superficial layers of the optic tectum, enables rough visual orientation without specific information processing at spring time. During the mating season, common toads do not feed, so the neurons involved in prey recognition show only a weak response or no response at all. In the deeper tectal layers, however, there are neurons whose visual receptive fields are expanded, enabling them to obtain information from the entire field of vision of one or both eyes. This indicates enormous visual convergence, for which T4-type neurons, whose dendritic trees extend far into the tectal layers, form the appropriate neuroanatomical substrate. These wide-field neurons — recorded both in frogs and toads — are more sensitive than technical motion sensors, as they fire even when the experimenter moves something, such as one of his fingers, at a distance of 10 m. Deeper in the optic tectum, toward the tegmental areas, such a visual wide-field neuron receives additional somatosensory input from the entire ipsilateral body skin, so that tactile and/or vibratory stimuli can lower the response threshold for a potentially expected visual stimulus. In the laboratory, vibrations caused by footsteps on the floor trigger strong neuronal activity even at a distance of 10 m. This explains why, in the wild, frogs and toads jump into nearby ditches when someone tries to approach them cautiously. As the recording electrode advances laterally towards the semicircularis nucleus, auditory neurons contribute to the 'multisensory concert.'

After pairing, this concert reaches a moderate volume, and common toads behave like loners. They migrate back to their hunting grounds near the forests, which is accompanied by a neurophysiological 'return of precise vision,' in which visual information is processed appropriately and behaviors are visually triggered and controlled, for example when catching prey.

During the hunting season, the common toad responds to a moving insect or worm with a series of prey-catching reactions:

1. orienting towards prey
2. stalking up to prey
3. binocular fixation
4. snapping
5. swallowing
6. mouth-wiping with forelimb

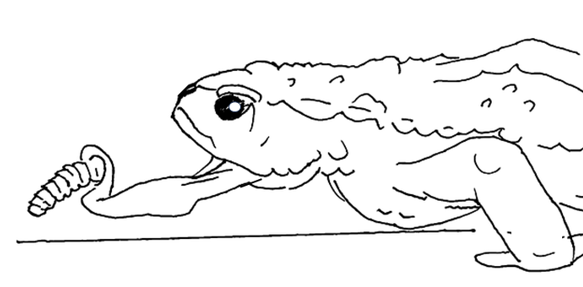
A common toad, Bufo bufo, snatches a mealworm. An electronic circuit makes it possible for the touch of the toad's tongue to trigger the camera shutter. Photo and setup: Courtesy of H.-G. Meyer, JPE.Arch, Kassel (1987)

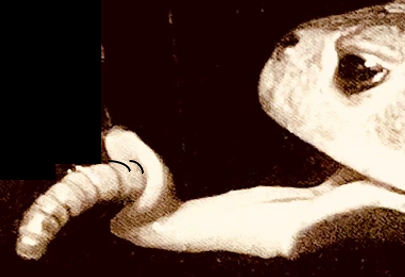
'Grasping reflex' of common toad's tongue. The toad 'shoots' its sticky tongue at a mealworm. As soon as the tongue is extended, it wraps itself around the prey. When retracting, the muscle that pulls the tongue back acts at a right angle to the surface of the prey object. This creates an adhesive effect, similar to that of adhesive tape. This ensures that the tongue does not detach from the prey until the swallowing process begins.

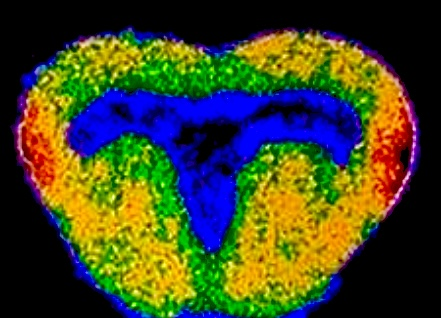
In the snapping evoking area SEA (red-black) of the toad’s optic tectum shown in a cross-section through the midbrain, prey detecting T5.2 neurons were recorded. Their axons project to the hypoglossal nucleus which generates the motor pattern of snapping behavior. The SEA was labeled using the [14C]-2-deoxyglucose technique during repeated activation of snapping in response to a visual prey object. Radioactivity, as a measure of local energy metabolism, is rendered in cool to warm-black shades; blue: third ventricle. Note that focal electrical stimulation of SEA by means of an appropriate experimental setup triggered snapping in the absence of prey. Source: JPE.Arch.26

The sequence of reactions (1) to (4) forms a kind of stimulus-response chain in which the prey-signal, in combination with a new location-signal, determines the stimulus constellation for the next type of reaction; see toad video: When an object is recognized as prey and thus attracts attention, and the prey is in the peripheral field of vision, the toad turns its head and body toward the prey. If the prey is far away, the toad begins to pursue it. After reaching the prey, the toad fixes its gaze on it intensely with both eyes. Finally, it snaps at prey from short distance with its tongue or jaws. The tongue-assisted swallowing process (5) is aided by a mechanism in which toads —much like frogs— retract their eyeballs into their heads, which helps push the food down their throats.

The stimulus responses (1)-(4) form a series of clearly defined behavioral patterns. One reason for this type of stimulus-response chain is that, unlike humans, toads do not have involuntary saccadic eye movements, and they also cannot perform 'tracking eye movements.' Their visual system, therefore, focuses on the perception of retinal images of moving visual objects.

The lack of saccadic eye movements forces the toad to hold its eyes in rigid positions. Since the stimulus parameter movement is an essential prey feature, the toad must decide whether an object is 'prey' or 'non-prey' before moving itself. As the toad orients towards a moving prey object, it has already decided prey. Upon recognition, the toad indicates its 'prey arousal' often by a characteristic trembling of the long toes on its hind limbs. In the event that the prey suddenly disappeared, the toad may snap at nothing. This means that the prey information obtained can be stored for a certain period of time so that it can be retrieved shortly afterwards and converted into a catching response.

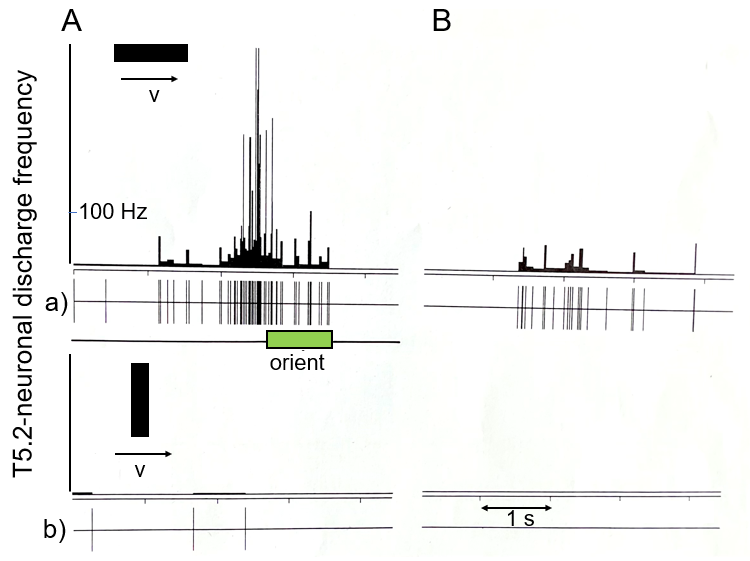
Discharge pattern of a tectal T5.2 neuron involved in triggering prey capture „orienting behavior“ in a common toad. The prey object consisted of a 2mm x 20mm worm-like moving dummy (a) that traversed the neuron‘s receptive visual field of 20-35deg diameter at a velocity of v=30mm/s in the monocular peripheral field of vision. A warming-up of the discharge frequency triggered orienting toward prey in the hungry toad (Aa), which failed to occur in a satiated animal (Ba). Sluggish firing and no prey catching were observed to an object in a non-prey configuration (Ab, Bb). The distinction between prey and non-prey is maintained even below the threshold of prey capture. - Adapted from data by Schürg-Pfeiffer, Spreckelsen, Ewert 1993

This is consistent with the frequency time histogram of the discharges of a prey detecting T5.2 neuron for orienting toward prey recorded from optic tectum in a freely moving common toad: A warming-up of the discharge frequency announces the toad's orienting turning movement of head and body that starts shortly after the warm-up peak and lasts for the duration of neuronal firing. The difference between neuronal discharge frequencies in response to prey vs. non-prey is maintained even below the threshold of prey capture.

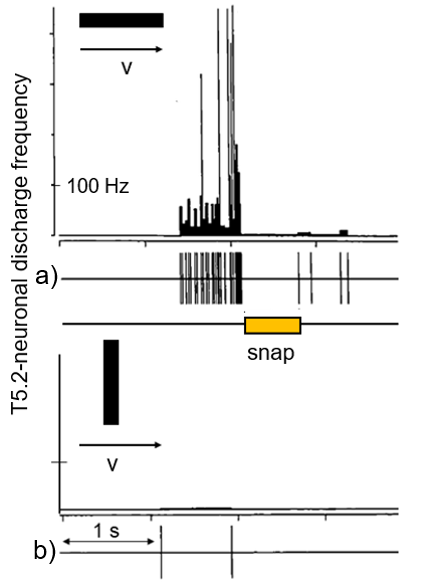
Discharge pattern of a tectal T5.2 neuron involved in triggering „snapping behavior“ of the toad toward prey that was moving in the neuron’s binocular field of vision at snap distance. In response to prey (a), a warming-up of the discharge frequency triggered snapping, in contrast to an object in non-prey configuration (b). During snapping, the neuronal firing was typically inhibited.- Adapted from data by Schürg-Pfeiffer, Spreckelsen, Ewert 1993

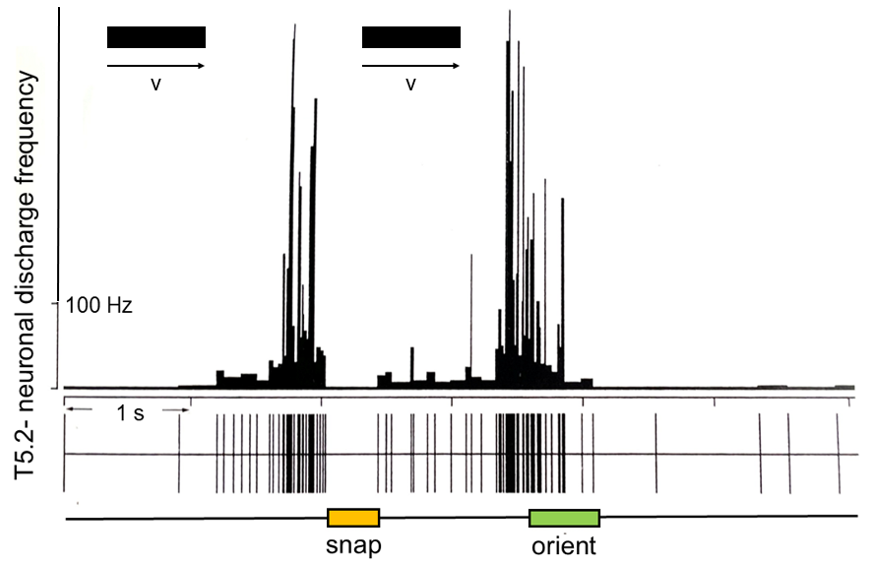
Discharge pattern of a tectal T5.2 neuron involved in triggering „snapping“ and „orienting“ behavior of the toad toward prey that was moving in the neuron‘s binocular visual field at snap distance: After an initially failed snap, the toad re-oriented its position for a subsequent (not shown) snap. A warming-up of the discharge frequency triggered the toad's snapping or orienting response to the prey object. During snapping, the neuronal firing was typically inhibited.- Adapted from data by Schürg-Pfeiffer, Spreckelsen, Ewert 1993

When stimulus conditions allow for snapping at prey, the histogram of the firing rate of a corresponding T5.2 neuron over time reveals another interesting phenomenon: A strong "warm-up peak of the discharge frequency" —after prey has been detected and the trigger for snap activated — is terminated during snapping. Apparently, this "snap correlated inhibition" terminates visual perception and separates it from the subsequent consummatory reaction. This ensures that the toad's head is correctly aligned during the precise snapping attack with jaw and tongue: (1) opening the mouth and activate palatal stabilizing muscle, (2) projecting the tongue toward prey by activating tongue projector muscle, (3) grasping the prey with the tongue, (4) retracting the tongue with prey by activating tongue retractor muscle, (5) closing the mouth and swallowing prey.

In summary, both response types of T5.2 neurons — characterized by "orient sustaining firing" vs. "snap correlated inhibition of firing"— exhibit a typical premotor warm-up phase that correlates with the trigger threshold for prey capture. T5.2 neurons, whose receptive fields are located in the binocular visual field, can take on either response type, e.g., orienting toward prey after a failed snap. This shows that T5.2 neurons in the tectal representation of the binocular visual field can be shared by releasing systems for orienting and snapping. In satiated toads, both the warm-up phase of T5.2 neurons and the prey capture behavior fail to occur.

These recording studies on freely moving toads demonstrate that T5.2 neurons in the toad's brain are capable of distinguishing prey from non-prey configurationally —in a sense, subliminally— when the toad is not motivated to hunt, for instance, when it is satiated. In a hungry toad, the warm-up-firing of the T5.2 neurons is the neural event (with a 'go-function') that triggers prey-catching behavior.

In each case, the data were collected from a freely moving common toad using a sophisticated stimulus presentation and microelectrode recording system.

== Prey vs. predator response ==
Among potential prey, common toads prefer small invertebrates that move in the direction of their body axis, such as ants, slugs, beetles, millipedes, and worms. They avoid large, moving objects such as the shadows of birds of prey or objects whose body parts are aligned perpendicular to the direction of movement, such as snakes or certain caterpillars. When a toad is presented with a moving stimulus, it generally may react with one of two responses: Depending on the size and the configuration of the stimulus, it will either engage in prey orienting (prey-catching) behavior or predator avoidance (escape) behavior, which consists of ducking-down postures or jumping away in panic. Snakes are considered the arch enemies of toads. Snakes move in a way that toads perceive as a warning: the snake raises its head and moves its body coils sideways, hence creating images that run transverse to the direction of motion. This dynamic gestalt (see feature detection (nervous system)) contrasts with that of an earthworm, for example, and is therefore referred to in laboratory jargon as anti-worm configuration vs. worm configuration. When confronted by a horseshoe whip snake, the toad will crouch down and try to dig in, jump away, or remain motionless. Sitting still, it employs various defense strategies while maintaining eye contact and secreting poison from its skin glands. Its body swells, causing it to assume a defensive stance with its head lowered and legs extended. At the same time, its head and back serve as a protective shield. This posture puts the toad in a position that makes it difficult for a snake to attack or grab it.

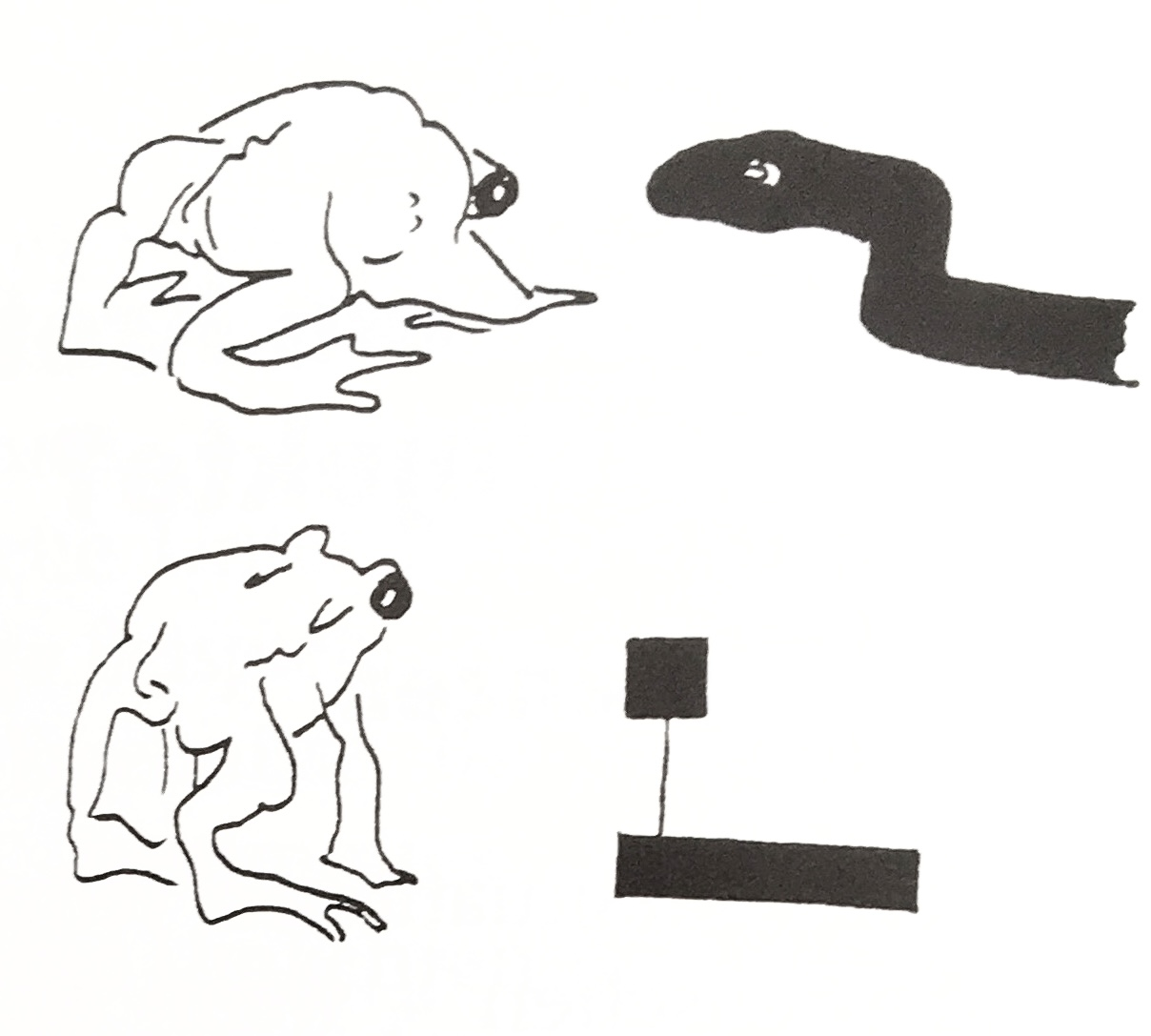
Defense and avoidance behaviors of common toads Bufo bufo in response to anti-worm like visual features displayed by a horseshoe whip snake (top) or a moving snake dummy of thin tube material (bottom). Drawings based on original photographs published by Ewert and Traud 1979

In determining the overall size of a stimulus, a toad will consider both the angular size, which is measured in degrees of visual angle, and the absolute size, which takes into consideration the distance between the toad and the object. This second ability, to judge absolute size by estimating distance, is known as size constancy.

To study behavioral responses of toads to varying types of stimuli, Ewert conducted experiments by placing the toad in the center of a little cylindrical glass vessel. He then rotated a small stripe (bar) of contrasting cardboard (acting as a visual 'dummy') around the vessel to mimic either prey-like or threat-like stimuli; see Video. The rate of turning was recorded as a measure of orienting behavior (prey-catching activity). In a comparative study of different visual test objects, the measurements of a toad’s prey-capture activity R (number of capture reactions per time period) in response to a test object, taken at equal intervals, correlate with the probability that the object belongs to the prey category —that is, with the degree to which the object resembles prey to the toad. By changing characteristics of the visual stimulus in a methodical manner, Ewert was able to comprehensively study the key features that determine behavior.

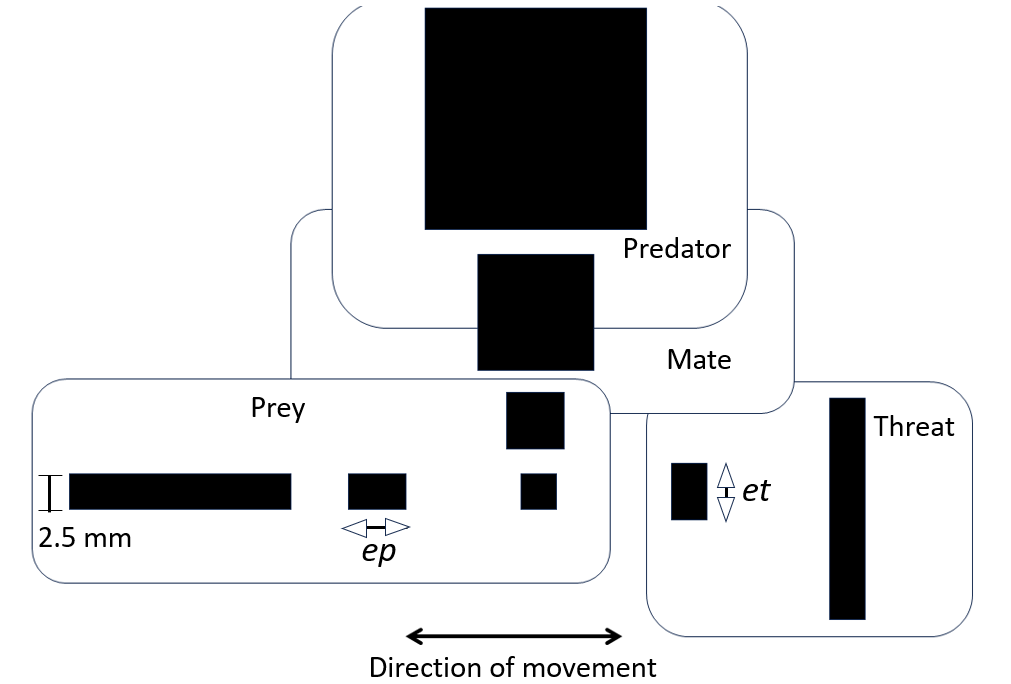
Experimental ep/et paradigm of moving configurative visual objects that signal prey, threat, predator, or mate to toads of Bufo spec. The extensions parallel (ep) and/or transverse (et) to the direction of movement were varied step by step. During the mating season, hormonal influences prevent the category mate from overlapping with the categories prey and predator by increasing the thresholds for readiness of prey capture and predator avoidance. Modified after Ewert 1968

Up to a certain size, squares (or disc-shaped objects) rotating around the toad successfully elicited prey-catching responses. Toads avoided moving large objects. Vertical bars moving horizontally nearly never elicited prey-catching behavior, and they were increasingly ineffective with increasing height. Horizontal bars, in contrast, were very successful at eliciting prey-catching behavior and their effectiveness increased with increasing length, to a certain degree. Additional vertical segments on top of horizontal bars significantly decreased prey-catching responses. By means of a different experimental setup it was shown that the worm vs. anti-worm discrimination is independent (invariant ) of the direction the object moves in the toad's visual field. Taking into account motion direction invariance, a more general formulation is: alignment of a bar parallel to vs. transverse (across) its direction of motion. [Note: The terms horizontal bar and vertical bar refer specifically to motion in the horizontal plane; see also: feature detection (nervous system).] The movement specificity of the toad's visual system is instrumental for classifying moving visual objects as prey or threads. This classification is based on a calculation of the alignment of the longitudinal axes of the objects in relation to the direction of their motion, as opposed to gravity as a reference value (cf. vertical or horizontal orientation): A millipede running horizontally along the ground or climbing up a vertical blade of grass falls into the toad's prey category. For models of prey vs. threat recognition, see: concept of 'neural filter interaction'; 'systems theoretical analysis'; 'schema theoretical approach'.

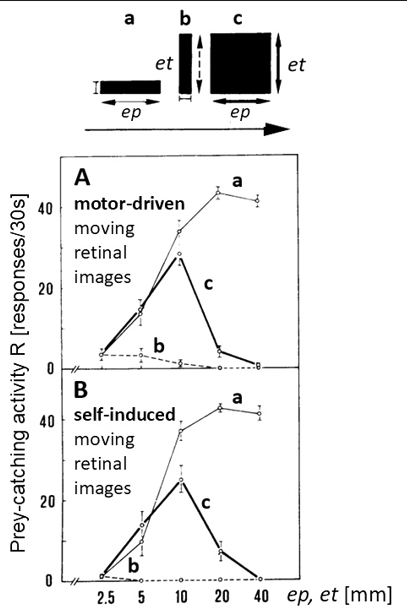
Toads do not distinguish between retinal images of moving objects and induced moving images of stationary objects. In A), an object from series a, b, c with different edge lengths ep/et is moved mechanically at 10 deg/s around the toad sitting in a glass jar, and the prey-catching activity is measured. In B), the glass jar with the toad is centered on a slowly rotating disc in front of a stationary object from a, b, c. As the disc begins to rotate, the toad exhibits vestibular nystagmus, which leads to induced moving retinal images of the stationary object and triggers corresponding prey-catching activity. Combined after Ewert 1968; Burghagen and Ewert 1983

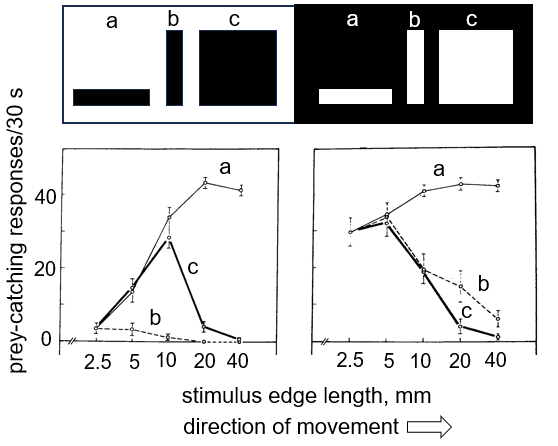
Influence of the contrast direction of prey on the common toad's prey capture activity in response to moving configurational stimuli: worm-like (a), antiworm-like (b), and square (c). Velocity: 18mm/s. Adapted from data by Burghagen and Ewert 1983

A stationary object, such as a barrier, elicits evasive detour behavior of the toad. However, there are examples showing that stationary objects under certain conditions trigger prey capture: When a toad moves its head with its immobile eyes, the retinal image of an object moves in the opposite direction due to induced movement. It is recognized as prey and responded to with prey capture, provided the configuration of the image matches the prey schema of the analyzing central visual system. This applies when the background of the object is untextured, e.g. a black object in front of a white background. However, if the background is textured, such as by a Julesz random-dot texture or a natural view of a forest floor with little branches and leaf structures, the object is ignored by the toad due to visual masking: The object is masked by the moving background texture. The inhibitory phenomenon between the target stimulus and the masking stimulus was investigated in toads quantitatively using various experimental procedures.

The strength of background to signal masking was different in retinal (R), tectal (T), and thalamic pretectal (TH) neurons, i.e. strongest in prey-detecting T5.2 neurons and weakest in TH3. It is suggested that the masking effect results from pretecto-tectal inhibition.

Problems with purpose-oriented interpretations?

A change in the contrast direction between a moving object and its background — black on white or white on black – has no influence on the algorithm for distinguishing configurations of worm-like vs. antiworm-like bars, as shown in the figure by the stimulus-response lines (a) and (b). In the case of antiworm (b) and square (c), the corresponding contrast boundaries transverse to the direction of movement are decisive and thus support the toad's preference for wormlike moving objects. However, unlike black contrasting objects, white contrasting antiworm objects (lines b) are not well distinguished from appropriate square objects (lines c). It can therefore be concluded that, in common toads, configurational object selection is more precise for dark objects moving against a bright background.

Small objects that are white on a black background trigger significantly stronger prey-catching activity than black objects of the same size on a white background (cf. lines a in the figure for black or white bars). At first glance, we are familiar with a comparable phenomenon from visual perception, namely the irradiation illusion: a white object on a black background appears larger than a black object of the same size on a white background. An evolutionary advantage to consider could be that small, light-colored objects are easier to see at dusk or in low light conditions, as white color reflects more photons than black. The contrast phenomenon even reverses seasonally.

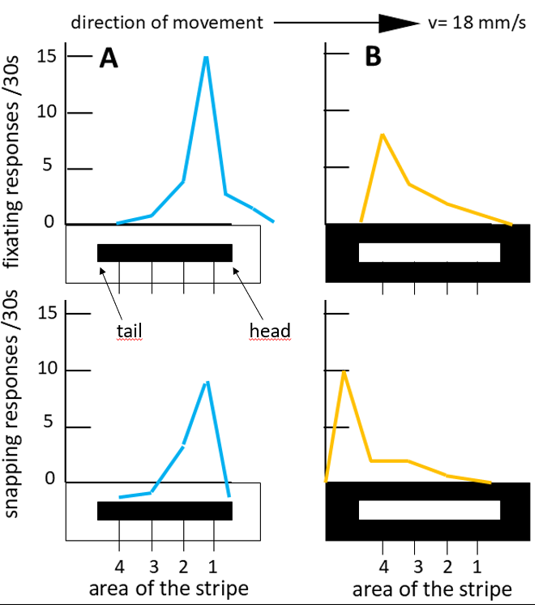
A worm-like object of 2.5mm x 40mm elicits 'head preference' (A) or 'tail preference' (B) depending on the direction of its contrast with the background. Adapted from data by Burghagen and Ewert 1982.

However, a disadvantage could arise when a hunting toad is confronted with worm-like moving prey. If the prey is black and the background is white, the toad snaps successfully at the edge that points in the direction of movement (head preference), but if it encounters a worm with reverse contrast, it chooses the rear edge of the white worm (tail preference) and often misses the prey when attempting to catch it by snapping into the void. Neurophysiological 'off' effects (rapid change in luminance from light to dark) caused by the leading edge (black worm) or trailing edge (white worm) may play an important role in the head vs. tail preference. This could increase the survival rate of a light-colored worm.

In summary, it can be concluded that configuration-based species-specific prey selection in common toads —while it works very well with black objects moving against a white background— is less precise for white objects moving against a black background. This applies to:

(i) prey localization [example: ‚tail-preference‘ may prevent a toad from catching a worm-like moving white bar]; (ii) configurational prey discrimination [example: toad confuses square-shaped and antiworm-like white objects of comparable edge length]; (iii) optimal trigger effect of square prey objects [white objects trigger higher prey-capture activity than black objects of comparable sizes]; (iv) optimal absolute prey size [is significantly smaller for white square objects against a black background (6.3 mm) than for black ones against white background (10 mm)].

Note: The neuroethological experiments conducted as part of this project focus —unless otherwise noted— on black objects moving against a white background.

== Feature detectors and the visual system ==
Selected functions of the toad‘s visual system:

1. The neural circuitry mediating between configurational features of the visual prey stimulus and prey capture behavior consists of retina-fed tectal pathways and corresponding rhombencephalic/spinal nuclei.
2. The distinction between prey (food) and non-prey (e.g., threat) is based on network interaction of the retino-tectal pathways of the mesencephalon with retino-pretectal thalamic structures of the diencephalon.
3. The localization of moving visual objects takes advantage of the retinotopic map in the optic tectum in connection with monocular and binocular depth calculations and retino-tectal/tegmental patways.
4. Targeted attention, i.e., the translation of visual perception into motor action, is based on disinhibitory modulating forebrain loops involving the telencephalic striatum.
5. Modification of configurational prey recognition in the course of visual or olfactory associative learning are based on a modulating disinhibitory forebrain loop involving the telencephalic posterior ventromedial (hippocampal) pallium, the anterior thalamus, the pretectal caudal dorsolateral thalamus and the optic tectum.
6. Dopaminergic modulations in the brain's macronet (e.g., after systemic administration of the dopamine agonist apomorphine) increase firing rates of retinal ganglion cells and the preying motivation and alter capture strategies with regard to pursuing and hunting prey versus waiting for prey and snapping.

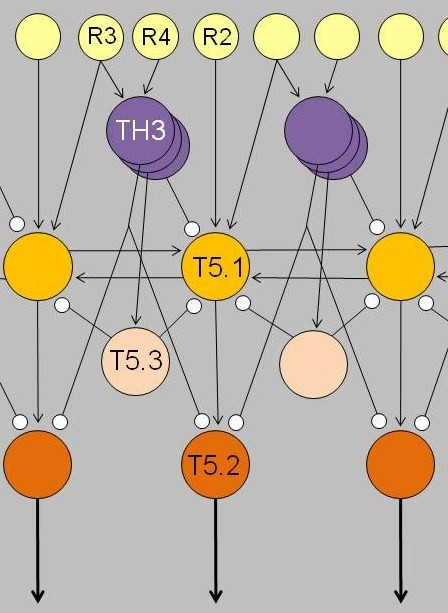
Tectal prey feature detectors T5.2 project the axons towards bulbar premotor/motor systems. Their response characteristic results from integration in a neuronal network involving retinal ganglion cells R2, R3, R4, pretectal caudal thalamic neurons TH3, and tectal neurons T5.1, T5.2, T5.3. Arrows: excitatory connections; lines with terminal dots: inhibitory influences [suggested: presynaptic inhibition and postsynaptic inhibition via inhibitory tectal T5.3 interneurons. Connections were checked, e.g., by means of intracellular recording postsynaptic potentials, horseradish peroxidase or cobalt-lysine backfilling, antidromic electro-stimulation/recording, neurochemical techniques, chemical lesions by kainic acid. Hypothesis after Ewert 1974 and 2004

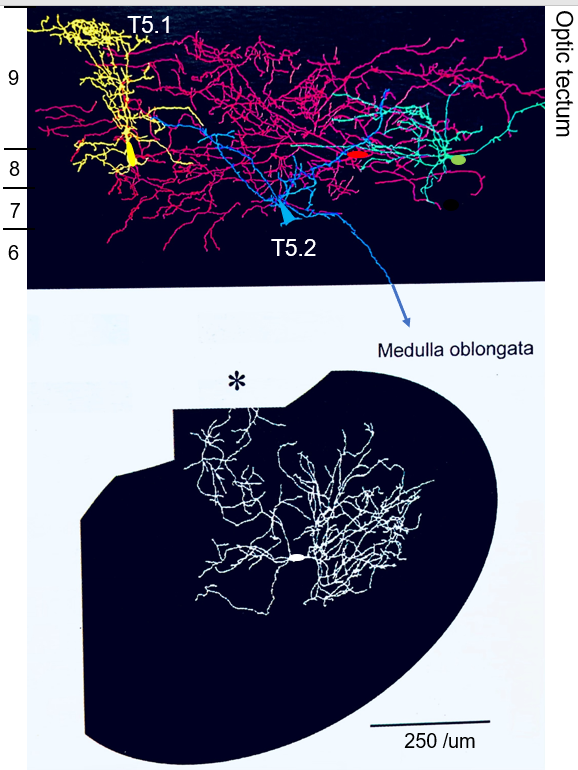
Camera-lucida reconstructions of neurons in histological transverse sections of the anuran’s optic tectum (top) and medulla oblongata (bottom). Retinal ganglion cell fibers R2 to R4 from the contralateral eye terminate in layers 9 to 8 close to the dendrites of T5.1 pearshaped cells (colored yellow). Ipsilateral pretecto-tectal projections (partly transmitting NPY) terminate mainly in the upper half of layer 9. A subtype T5.3 (green) with pretectal input is suitable for intratectal interaction. The huge dendritic tree of a T4 neuron (red) responds to stimuli moving in any portion of the visual field of the contralateral eye. The T5.2 pyramidal cell (blue) – a prey selective neuron – at the boundary between layers 8 and 7 integrates input from Layers 9 and 8 and projects its axon (distorted in this illustration) along layer 7 towards the motor neurons (white) of the medulla oblongata which receive input, for example, from T5.2 cells. – Figure reprinted with kind permission of Elsevier, from Ewert (1997) Trends in Neurosciences 20(8), 332-339.

To understand the neural mechanisms underlying the toad's prey catching and predator avoidance responses, Ewert performed a series of recording and visual stimulation experiments based on the available neuroanatomic data. First and foremost, the results allowed him to understand the way the visual system is constructed and connected to the central nervous system. Secondly, he discovered areas of the brain that were responsible for differential analysis of visual stimuli.

The neurophysiological analysis of vision in anuran amphibians was introduced in the 1950s/60s by Jerome Lettvin, Horace Barlow, and colleagues, who were interested in: What does the eye communicate to its brain in terms of the parameters of visual stimuli, and how is the brain involved in visual pattern recognition? Their investigations in frogs focused on the response characteristics of retinal ganglion cells, which process the information provided by the photoreceptor cells via intermediate interneurons (amacrine, horizontal, bipolar cells), and transmit the results to the brain via their axons in the optic nerve. Neuroanatomists paved the way for insights into neural structure and function of the visual system of anuran amphibians.

In both common toads and frogs, the retina is connected to the optic tectum of the midbrain by at least three types of ganglion cells. The responses of a retinal ganglion cell can be recorded from its axon terminal in the superficial tectum using an electrolytically sharpened and lacquer-coated metal microelectrode. Each of the ganglion cells has an excitatory receptive field and a surrounding inhibitory receptive field, but they differ in the diameters of their central excitatory receptive fields, ERF, and the inhibitory receptive fields, IRF. The ERF-diameters in class II (R2) ganglion cells are approximately four degrees visual angle. Those in class III (R3) cells are about eight degrees, and ERFs of class IV (R4) ganglion cells range from twelve to fifteen degrees. As stimuli traverse the toad's visual field, information is sent to the optic tectum. The visual field of each eye is projected via the axons of the R cells in the optic nerve through an almost complete optic chiasm to the contralateral optic tectum. The field of vision is 'scanned,' and visual stimuli are pre-processed by the ganglion cell classes in terms of visual angular size, visual angular velocity, stimulus background contrast, and changes in diffuse illumination. The three classes respond to moving visual objects whose size correlates with the diameter of their ERF. The neurons of class R2 exhibit a peculiarity in that they not only discharge while a small object is moving, but also for a period of time after the object has suddenly stopped moving within the ERF. This inspires a comparison with the scenario of a fly after landing: it walks, stands still, and simply remains standing.

The optic tectum exists as an ordered localization system, in the form of a topographical map. Each point on the map corresponds to a particular region of the toad's retina and thus its entire visual field. Likewise, when a spot on the tectum was electrically stimulated, the toad would turn toward a corresponding part of its visual field, as if this part was stimulated by a prey object, hence providing further evidence of the direct spatial connections.

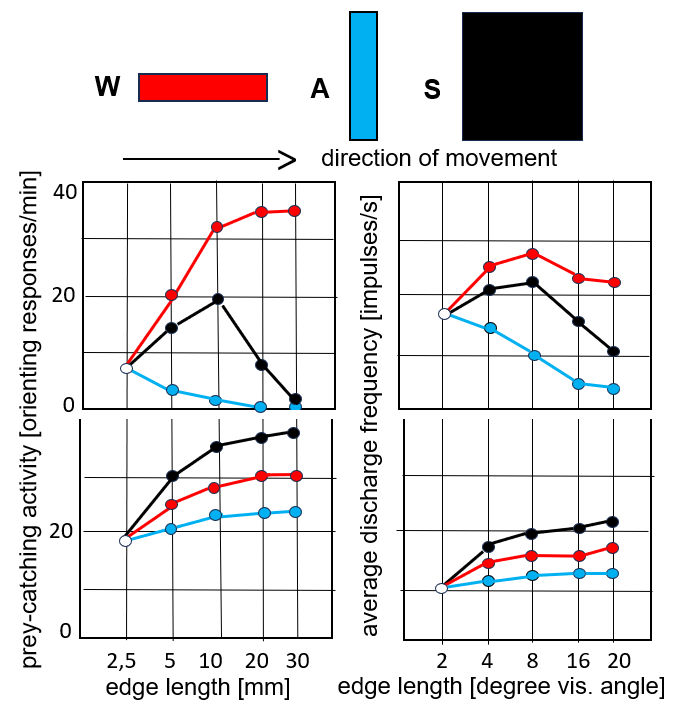
Prey selective tectal T5.2 neurons. The upper part of the figure presents a comparison of the prey-catching activity of common toads (left) and the discharge frequencies of prey-selective T5.2 neurons (right) in response to square (S), worm-like (W), and anti-worm-like (A) moving test objects of varying edge length. Bottom: Responses subsequent to pretectal thalamic lesions. This adaptation is derived from Ewert and v. Wietersheim (1974).

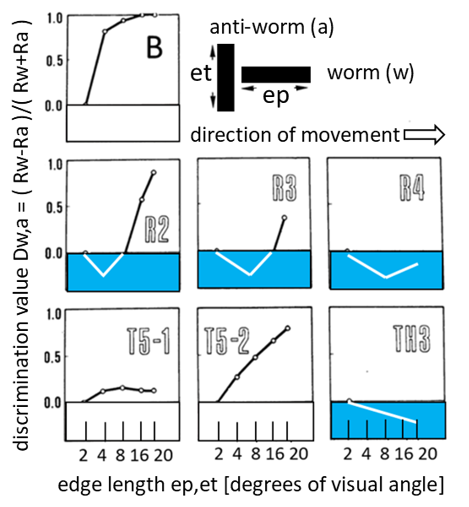
The question of prey detecting neurons in the common toad's visual system was investigated by measuring the response activities R to worm-like (Rw) and anti-worm like (Ra) bars for prey catching behavior (B) and the discharge frequencies of retinal (R2, R3, R4), tectal (T5.1, T5.2) and thalamic pretectal (TH3) neurons. The discrimination values Dw,a=(Rw-Ra)/(Rw+Ra) are plotted against the bars of comparable edge length ep and et. In the case of Dw,a being greater than 0, w is preferred over a; conversely, for Dw,a being less than 0, a is preferred over w. Prey-selective T5.2 neurons demonstrate the strongest correlation with the behavioral data (cf. B and T5.2). Adapted from Ewert, Borchers, v. Wietersheim (1978).

Among Ewert's numerous experimental findings is the identification of feature detectors, i.e., neurons in the visual system that selectively respond to behaviorally relevant features of a visual stimulus. For methodological reasons and to comply with neuroethological standards, behavioral [B] and neuronal [N] stimulus-responses were measured using perimeter-like procedures. These allowed motor-driven black rectangular objects to be moved across specific areas of a toad’s visual field against a white background: in freely moving animals, to study their prey-capture activity, or in pharmacologically immobilized animals, to measure the firing rate of specific neuron types. Managing of the visual objects —scaled to sizes measured either in millimeters [B] or in degrees of visual angle [N]— enabled comparisons regarding the relationships between stimuli and responses.

Remark: Succinylcholine-induced immobilization of the experimental animal —following anesthesia and oxygen supply— made it possible to ensure vibration-free, constant experimental conditions with regard to the following aspects: (i) the micromanipulator-assisted positioning of the recording microelectrode near a single neuron in the brain, and (ii) the mechanoelectronic control of the precise presentation of moving visual stimuli. In the high-end setup for recording action potentials from single brain neurons in freely moving toads, a small head mount was used that was attached to the toad’s skull and carried a miniaturized micromanipulation device with tiny preamplifiers for differential recording.

At the retinal level, the quantitative experimental results in common toads showed no 'fly detectors', 'bug detectors', 'beetle perceivers', 'worm detectors', or 'enemy detectors' in terms of their discharge characteristics in response to configuration defining features of moving objects: Retinal ganglion cells of the classes R2 or R3 discharge moderately when, for example, a Carabus beetle traverses their excitatory receptive field, but fire even more strongly when the same beetle is experimentally presented in a nonprey configuration — „anti-bug“ — that causes a toad to ignore or avoid it.

Instead, he found that the optic tectum and the pretectal caudal thalamic region play significant roles in the analysis and interpretation of visual stimuli (e.g., summarized in Ewert).

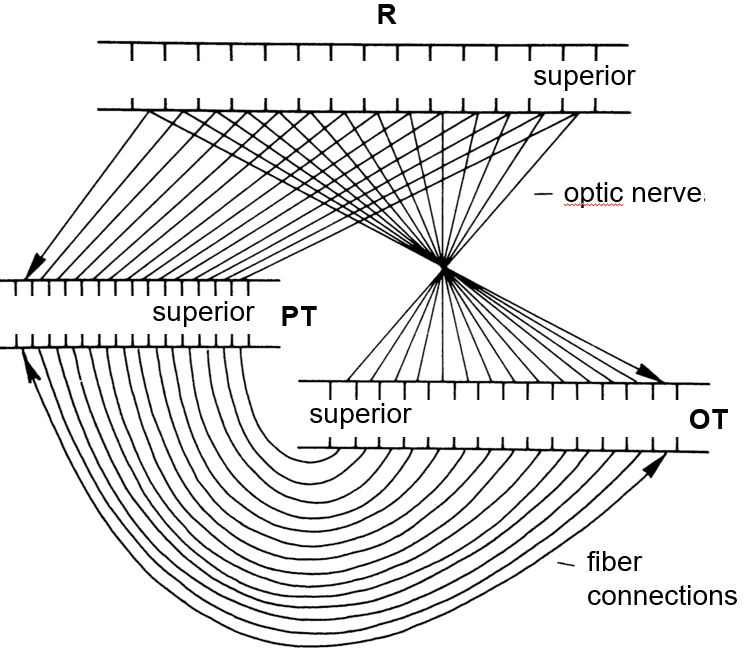
Schema of the anuran main central visual system. Retinotopic projections of optic fibers from retina (R) to contralateral optic tectum (OT) and to pretectal thalamus (PT), and the visual connections from PT ipsilaterally to OT; the label superior refers to the dorsal visual field in retinal maps.

Electrical stimulation experiments demonstrated that the optic tectum initiates orienting and snapping behaviors. It contains many different visually sensitive neurons, among these type I and type II neurons (later named T5.1 and T5.2, respectively). Type T5.1 neurons are activated when an object traversing the toad's visual field is extended (aligned) parallel to the direction of movement; type T5.2 neurons, too, but they will fire less when the object is extended across the direction of movement. Those T5.2 neurons display prey-selective properties; see prey feature detectors. The discharge activity of T5.2 neurons in response to changes in the prey defining configuration features of a moving object correlates with corresponding prey capture activity.

Definition: The Dw,a values shown in the figure serve as a measure of the gestalt-contrast between two black stimulus bars of the same shape that move in different configurations (gestalt) against a light background: either in a worm-like (w) or anti-worm -like (a) manner. This contrast was determined quantitatively based on the toad’s prey-capture activity or the responses of its visual neuron types, respectively. — The term gestalt-perception is used in the sense of a definition coined by Tinbergen to describe the configurative nature of perception of certain sign (key) stimuli. As a contribution to a neuroethological causal analysis, Stevens discusses this gestalt-principle in the context of implicit versus explicit processing of prey vs. non-prey -related features in the visual perception by toads.

The prey detecting T5.2 neurons in immobilized toads [following systemic administration of succinylcholine] distinguish visual moving prey and threat objects of different sizes and configurations in terms of visual angle: They correctly determine the behaviorally relevant proportions and relationships of the visual object extensions ep and et. What prevents them —unlike freely moving toads— to calculate the actual sizes of such objects? The toads, which had been immobilized in the experimental setup for methodological reasons, had adjusted their vision to far point. In freely moving toads, prey selective T5.2 neurons exhibit the phenomenon of size-constancy during their prey-catching behaviors. By linking the visual angular size of the prey to its estimated distance from their eye through accommodation, these neurons can approximate the actual size of that object. The optimal size is approximately 10 mm for black square objects moving against a white background.

Grüsser and Grüsser-Cornehls in a table (on Tabelle 3, p.211) did not consider the perception of object distance: They classified the preys and threats as spots or disc-shaped objects based on frog's (or toad's) visual angle, suggesting that a prey is characterized by an angle of 6 degrees in size and an enemy of 20 degrees. Such an assumption is inconsistent with behavioral observations. Imagine a toad sitting in front of a moving prey that has an absolute size of 10 mm and is 95 mm away. The prey dummy, a disc of black cardboard against a white background, covers 6 degrees of the toad's monocular field of view. When the toad —after recognizing prey— comes nearer and approaches it to a distance of 25 mm, the size of this object, in terms of toad's visual angle, increases to about 20 degrees. However, this does not make the toad flee, because an interfacing process of size-constancy ensures that prey-selective T5.2 neurons activate the appropriate motor system, enabling the animal to snap at the object.

Experimental answers to open questions are still pending, for example, the neural correlates and implications of size constancy: How is the information from the retina processed to perceive the size of a visual object, taking into account its distance from the toad's eye? There are different methods by which toads can determine the distance between their eyes and a visual object: lens accommodation, triangulation, and binocular disparity. Prey size-constancy in toads develops several months after metamorphosis.

The caudal dorsal thalamic region of the diencephalon initiates avoidance behaviors in the toad. More specifically, electrical triggering this region initiates a variety of protective movements, such as eyelid closing, ducking, and turning away. Various types of neurons in this region are responsible for the avoidance behaviors, and they are all sensitive to different types of visual stimuli: One type of neurons (TH3) is activated by large, moving objects and — in the case of bar stimuli — those that are aligned across the direction of movement. Another type (TH6) is activated by a looming object moving toward the toad. Still other types (TH10) respond to large stationary obstacles, and there are also neurons responding to stimulation of the balance sensors in the toad's ear. Stimulation of (a combination of) such types of neurons would cause the toad to display different kinds of protective behaviors.

Lesioning experiments led to the discovery of pathways extending between the optic tectum and the pretectal thalamic region. When the tectum was removed, prey-orienting behavior disappeared. When the pretectal thalamic region was removed (optic tectum intact), avoidance behavior was entirely absent while prey-orienting behavior was enhanced even to predator objects. Prey-selective properties were impaired both in prey-selective T5.2 neurons and in prey-catching behavior. Finally, when one side of the pretectal thalamic region was removed, the disinhibition of prey-catching applied to the entire visual field of the opposite eye. These and other experiments suggest that pathways, involving axons of type TH3 threat-feature detectors —which are also retinotopically mapped— extend from the pretectal thalamus to the map of the optic tectum, suitable to modulate tectal responses to visual stimuli and to determine prey-selective T5.2 properties due to inhibitory influences. During intracellular recordings from frog’s tectal neurons in response to pretectal stimulation, about 98% of the implated cells showed inhibitory responses.

The present sensory hypothesis on prey recognition in toads by J.-P. Ewert is rooted in a causal-analytic experimental approach to visual feature processing, based on interactions between retina-fed optic tectal and retina-fed pretectal thalamic networks. A competing 'motor hypothesis' interprets visually guided prey-catching behavior of frogs or toads teleologically, i.e. in terms of the purpose it serves, rather than evolutionarily, i.e. with respect to the cause (trait) that triggers it. The motor hypothesis, therefore, assumes that prey detection depends on the snapping action. One of the main arguments against the motor hypothesis in the present context is based on chronic microelectrode recordings of individual neurons in the optic tectum in freely moving hungry toads. These results show that sensory, prey-selective T5.2 neurons play a crucial role in prey detection, in that: (i) they distinguish the proportions and relationships of behaviorally relevant ep/et features of visual objects, and (ii) a strong burst of activity in T5.2, on the one hand, correlates closely with the subsequent generation of the motor snapping pattern, while, on the other hand, it is completely suppressed during the snapping action.

== Modulatory loops, ontogenetic specifications, and evolutionary perspectives ==
Having analyzed neuronal processing streams in brain structures (pretectal, thalamic, tectal, medullary) that mediate between visual stimuli and adequate behavioral responses in toads, Ewert and coworkers examined various neural loops that — in connection with certain forebrain structures (striatal, pallial, thalamic) — can initiate, modulate or modify stimulus-response mediation. For example, in the course of associative learning, the toad's visual prey schema can be modified to include non-prey objects. The application of the [14C]-2DG method showed that the telencephalic posterior ventral medial pallium vMP revealed a significant increase in metabolic activity in the conditioned toads during prey capture toward large moving objects they had avoided prior to associative conditioning. After lesions to vMP, the conditioning effects of the toads failed, and their recognition of prey demonstrated species-specificity with the selectivity presumed to be phylogenetically conserved (see: Ewert J.-P., Dinges A.W., Finkenstädt T. (1994) Species-universal stimulus responses, modified through conditioning, reappear after telencephalic lesions in toads. In: Naturwissenschaften 81, 317-320.)

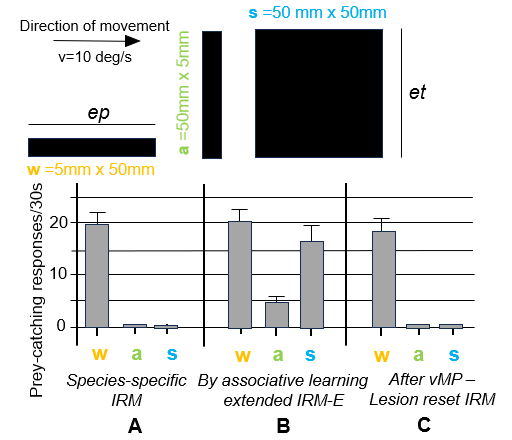
The species-specific prey selectivity to visual objects (w, a, s) of the suggested innate release mechanism, IRM, in the toad Bufo bufo (A) is modified by an IRM-E after individual experience during associative conditioning in the course of hand-feeding (B), and is being reset to the IRM following a lesion to the telencephalic posterior ventral medial plallium vMP (C). Adapted from data by Ewert, Dinges, Finkenstädt 1994.

The posterior part of the ventromedial pallium is homologous to the hippocampus of mammals which is also involved in learning processes. Both in anuran amphibians and mammals striatal efferents are involved in directed attention, i.e. gating an orienting response towards a sensory stimulus. The anuran striatum is homologous to a portion of the amniote basal ganglia.

From an evolutionary point of view, the tetrapod vertebrates share a common pattern of homologous forebrain and brainstem structures. Neuroethological, neuroanatomical, and neurochemical investigations suggest that the neural networks underlying essential functions—such as attention, orienting, approaching, avoidance, associative or non-associative learning, and basic motor skills—have, so to speak, a phylogenetic origin in homologous structures of the amphibian brain. Detlev Ploog and Peter Gottwald open a discussion in evolutionary psychology whether heading towards something or heading away from something—in a general sense— might have their primordial roots in diencephalic (thalamic) and mesencephalic (tectal, tegmental) nuclei of amphibians.

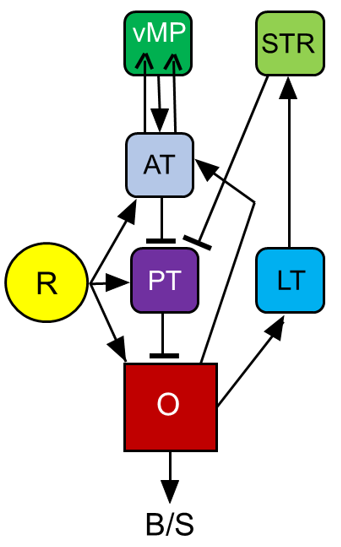
Simplified diagram of neural structures involved in visual functions, such as feature discrimination (R, PT, O), associative learning (vMP, AT, PT, O), and attention (STR, PT, LT, O) in connection with disynaptic disinhibition processes. The underlying neural network is suggested from experiments applying single neuron recording, focal brain stimulation, 14C-2-deoxiglucose uptake labeling, brain lesioning, and anatomical pathway tracing. - R, retina (contralateral eye); O, optic tectum; PT, pretectal caudal dorsolateral thalamus; LT, lateral anterior thalamic nucleus; AT, anterior thalamus; vMP, posterior ventromedial pallium; STR, caudal ventral striatum; B/S, bulbar/spinal pre-motor/motor nuclei; arrow: excitatory influences; line with cross bar: inhibitory influences. Complexity of connections between amphibian basal ganglia and optic tectum is discussed by Marin and Gonzalez. After Ewert and Schwippert 2006

From a neural network approach, it is reasonable to ask how the toad's ability to classify moving objects by special configuration cues develops, and whether this is unique in the animal kingdom. Developmental studies suggest that the detection principle is an adaptation in amphibians to their biotope and life style.

After hatching from the egg, the tadpole of Bufo bufo is programmed for a life in water and the subsequent postmetamorphic transition to life on land. To achieve this, hormonal, neural, neurosensory, and sensorimotor adaptations take place. The feeding behavior of the tadpole—which consumes bacteria and algae on aquatic plants, as well as carrion and debris—shifts during metamorphosis to a predatory, carnivorous lifestyle. This change goes hand in hand with a selectivity for visual prey objects that ‘move’ and thus show that they are alive and different from the stationary surround. An important discovery, therefore, is that common toads are predisposed to hunt worm-like moving objects in a configuration whose extension parallel to the direction of motion is typically greater than the extension transverse to it, and to avoid objects as threat that occur in anti-worm configuration. The ‘worm preference‘ is established after metamorphosis—during the toad's first steps on land—without it having to learn, and this preference matures over time.

The discrimination between prey and predator in the hunting behavior of toads towards the end of metamorphosis therefore requires a redesign of visual perception with regard to the necessary neural and sensorimotor functions: The motion specificity of retinal R2 (and R3) neurons contributes to the excitability of tectal T5.1 neurons in response to spatiotemporal features of contrast borders of objects aligned with their direction of motion. Since the neural discharge rates increase with the increasing edge length of an object, its trigger values for activating prey capture also increase. This, in turn, would mean the risk of neuronal avalanche excitation due to intratectal recurrent excitation if there were no inhibitory neuronal counteraction. Based on the brain development of Discoglossus tadpoles, it is assumed that during metamorphosis at Taylor&Kollros-stage-X, optical morphogenetic influences from the optic tectum to the adjacent 'caudal dorsomedial thalamus' initiate a parcellation process of segregation. The new aggregate is called the 'dorsolateral area'. It is thought to contain retino-receptive neurons, which—like TH3 cells in adult toads—are known to control the excitation of the optic tectum through massive inhibitory influences along their axons, similar to what is observed in frogs. The thalamic TH3 cells with input of retinal R3- (and R4-) neurons of the adult common toad are sensitive to contrast borders that are aligned transversely to their direction of movement, thereby limiting tectal excitation in a finely tuned manner that simultaneously determines the prey selectivity of tectal T5.2 neurons.

The neuroanatomical differentiation of the dorsolateral region of the caudal thalamus, which continues beyond the end of metamorphosis, suggests a correlation with the ontogenetic maturation of object size constancy and the improvement of acuity in configurative prey selection.

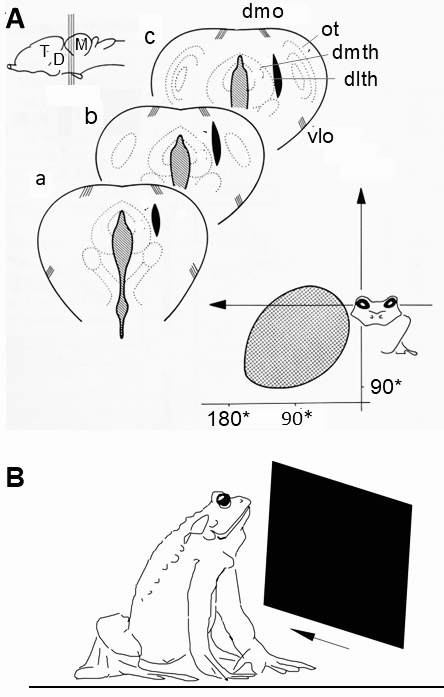
A) Micro-knife lesion to the toad's, Bufo bufo bufo left caudal dorsal diencephalon leads to ‘disinhibited‘ prey capture behavior to objects moving in its contralateral (right) visual field. T, telencephalon; D, diencephalon; M, mesencephalon. a-c: Brain transverse sections from rostral to caudal: dmo, dorsomedial optic tract; vlo, ventrolateral optic tract; ot, optic tectum; dmth, dorsomedial thalamic area; dlth, dorsolateral thalamic area. B) Unilaterally (left-side) lesioned toad shows 'disinhibited' prey capture-like mouthing behavior to a large object moving in a portion of the contralateral visual field. Adapted from Ewert and v. Wietersheim 1974

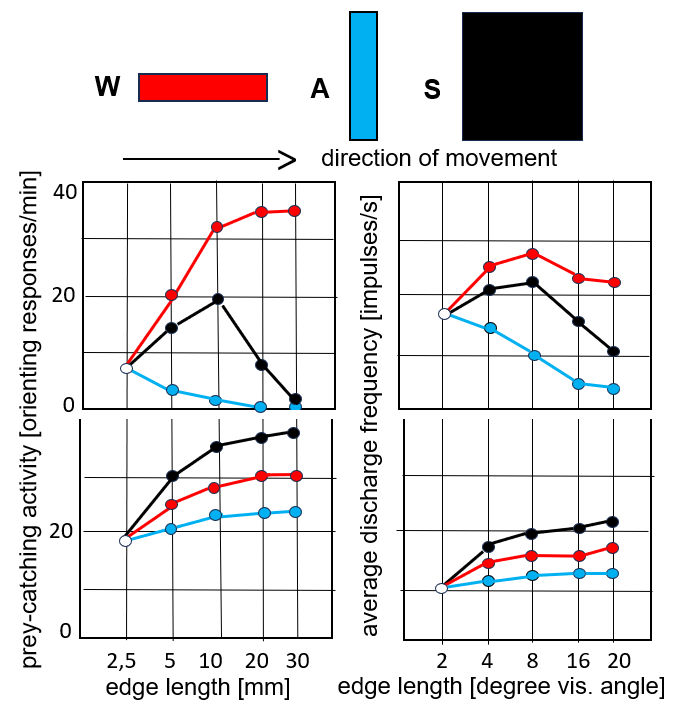
Pretectal thalamic lesioned toads do not distinguish between the configurational moving visual test objects: W-, A- and S- stimuli. Top: intact toads; bottom: lesioned toads; left: prey-catching responses; right: discharge frequencies of tectal T5.2 neurons (top) and T5.1 and T5.2 neurons (bottom). Adapted after Ewert and v. Wietersheim 1974

The tectal avalanche hypothesis in common toads Bufo bufo bufo (L.) is substantiated by results of a lesion in the pretectal caudal dorsal thalamus (dorsolateral area). Experimentally, when the surfaces of the various standard worm (W), anti-worm (A), and square (S) test objects were stepped up in size, the tectal neuronal T5.1;2 responses of the brain lesioned toad and its prey-catching reactivity increased progressively all in the same way.

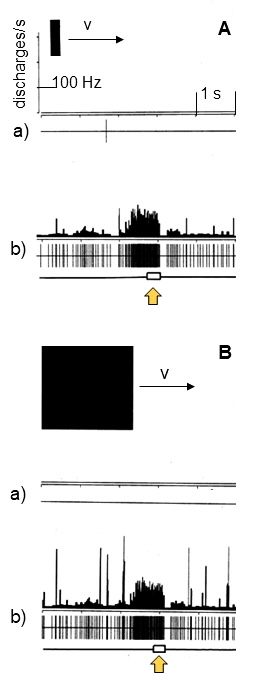
Thalamic pretectal lesion disinhibits in a satiated, less prey-motivated common toad the discharges of a tectal prey-selective T5.2 neuron to a threatening 2mm x 20mm anti-worm (A) or a 60mm x 60mm threatening square (B), v=30mm/s. a: pre lesion; b: post lesion, see orange arrow for onset of prey capture. Note the dramatic increase in discharge frequencies (b, post lesion) to antiworm object and large square, accompanied by spontaneous discharges. — Combined after data by Schürg-Pfeiffer, Spreckelsen, Ewert 1993

This lesion eliminated the toad's ability to distinguish between objects of different configurations and thus to correctly assign moving visual objects to a category of meaning, either prey or threat. Every moving object (or an induced moving retinal image) triggered a sometimes intense reflexive mouth behavior in the toad — a kind of prey object tracking and prey-oriented empty snapping — even in the direction of its moving hind feet. The visual discharges of a tectal T5.2 neuron, disinhibited accordingly, may have been accompanied by spontaneous neuronal activity.

In summary, if the retina-fed caudal dorsolateral thalamic region, which is tiny compared to the volume of the retina and the optic tectum, loses its control over retino-tectal information processing, the toad’s visual system collapses—in the broadest sense, comparable to visual agnosia.

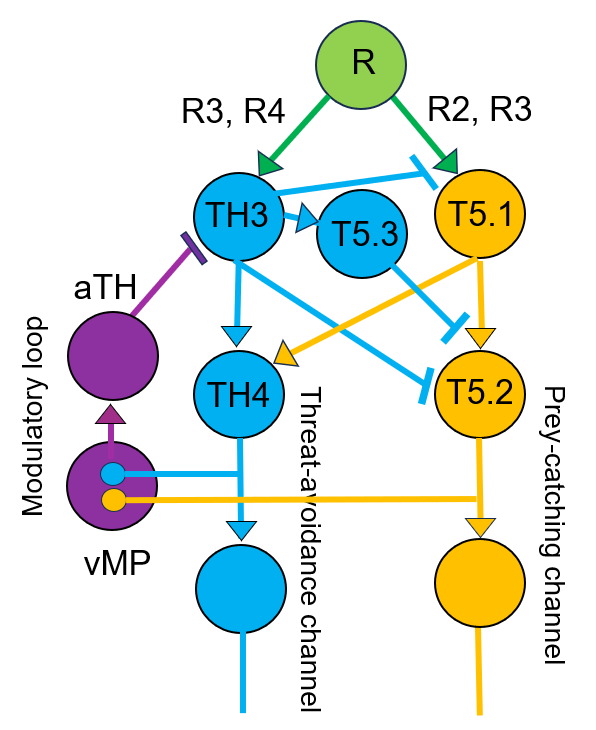
Working hypothesis on the control of toad’s pretectal thalamus in connection with associative conditioning. R, retina; R2,3,4, classes of retinal ganglion cells; TH3 pretectal thalamic neurons; TH4, predator selective neurons; T5.1, tectal filter neurons; T5.2, prey selective tectal neurons; T5.3, tectal inter neurons; vMP, posterior medial pallium; aTH, anterior thalamus; line with arrow: excitatory influence; line with cross bar: inhibitory influence. The activity pattern considers the changes in metabolic glucose utilization during prey capture of a toad in response to a large moving square object after hand-feeding conditioning: The [14C]-2DG uptake in vMP and optic tectum (T5.2 cells) increased, while uptake in pretectal dorsomedial/lateral thalamus (TH3 cells) decreased. This does not exclude differerent telencephalo-tectal disinhibitory processing streams. Further explanations see text. Adapted from Ewert 1974 and 1997

Large threatening objects stimulate pretectal thalamic TH3 and tectal T5.1 neurons to activate the threat avoidance channel. The question arises: What controls the pretectal dorsal thalamus? We recall the experiments on conditioning with hand feeding: The toad’s species-specific ability to recognize prey, can be modified by individual experience. A simplified working hypothesis suggests why toads after associative conditioning classify a large moving object as prey, much like following a pretectal thalamic lesion.

During the training phase, the experimenter presented a mealworm (prey) with hand (threat) to the toad once a week for two weeks. It is assumed that at the same time, a subliminal prey signal from the neuronal prey-catching channel AND a subliminal threat signal from the threat-avoidance channel were paired in hypothetical neurons of the telencephalic posterior pallium, vMP. Such pallial cells become sensitized after a period of the prey-threat pairing and thus can be activated by a stimulus from one of the two channels: prey OR threat. The pallial cells (vMP) — via the anterior thalamus (aTH) — are suggested to inhibit threat-detecting TH3 cells of the pretectal dorsolateral thalamus, thereby interrupting the threat channel, and disinhibiting prey-detecting T5.2 cells, thereby channeling the prey channel:

Disinhibitory pathways [excitation–>, inhibitory influences–/ ]

vMP–> aTH–/ TH3–/ T5.2–> disinhibiting prey capture

alternatively: vMP–/ aTH–> TH3–/ T5.2–>

The T5.2 cells expand their configurative response spectrum and include visually threatening objects as prey, which is reflected in corresponding prey capture activity. Experimental test of the pallial influence: After vMP lesion, the species-specific prey selectivity in toad's prey capture behavior is re-established. Disinhibition in neuronal networks is defined as a temporary inhibition brake that promotes excitation. This evolutionary conserved circuit is implicated in different functions, including sensory processing, learning, and memory.

Experiments, in which the olfactory non-prey stimulus cineol was combined with a visual prey stimulus during prey capture, showed that the toad's configurative prey selectivity for the moving test objects was expanded in the presence of the conditioned stimulus cineol. That kind of expansion was the result of a combination of factors, including a signal transmitted by the main olfactory bulb, which was associated with a visual signal from optic tectum in the medial pallium and, passing the ventral hypothalamus, arrived back in the optic tectum. This influenced the level of prey motivation as it served to decrease a visual threshold to the readiness of preying. The prey-oriented behavior exhibited towards the test objects was found to be equally unselective as the behavior that followed visual threat/prey conditioning or a lesion of the pretectal thalamus.

As for the recovery effects, the species specificity of visual pattern recognition was fully restored immediately after a vMP lesion. This contrasts with the restoration of species-specific visual pattern recognition following a pretectal thalamic lesion, which recovered to a certain extent after 5 days but did not reach its original selectivity in the following 10 days. The observation of a partial functional recovery of visual pattern recognition after a pretectal thalamic lesion suggests corresponding compensatory neurophysiological processes.

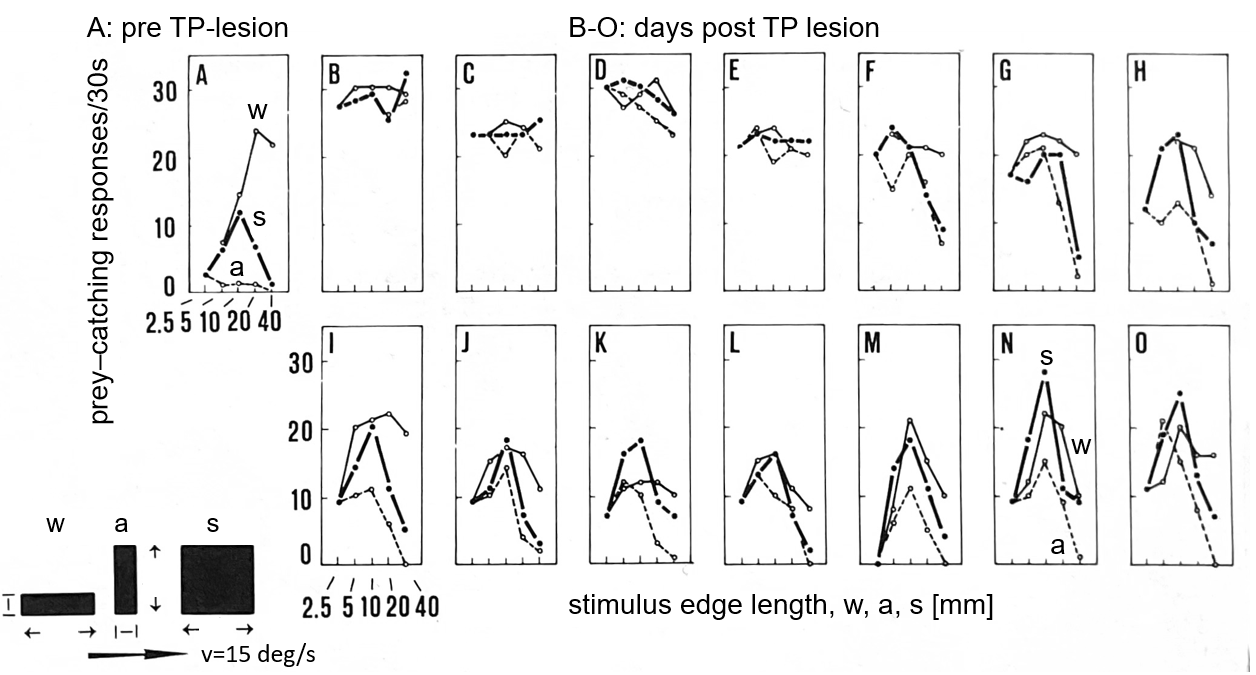
Visual discrimination in toads of three types of test patterns: w,a,s (worm w, antiworm a, and square s configuration) before a bilateral thalamic pretectal TP lesion (A) and recovery of function after 14 consecutive days (B-O). In the first 4 postoperative days the stimulus patterns were not discriminated. From the 5th day onwards, the prey catching activity to very large or small patterns decreased strongly, although the precise prey selectivity pre-lesion was not performed. Threat avoidance behavior failed to occur.-- After: JPEArch.1984

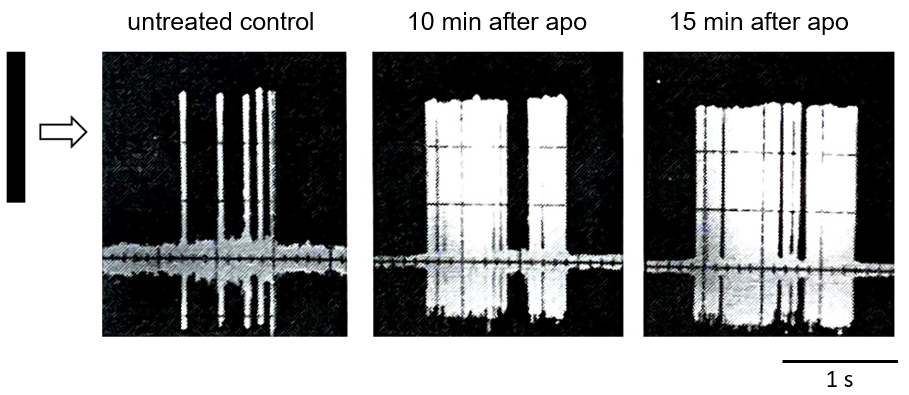
After intralymphatic administration of apomorphine (40 mg/kg), the excitatory visual receptive field (ERF) of a R2 neuron in the toad’s retina increased (ERF ~ 12 deg) to at least twice its original diameter compared to the untreated state (ERF ~ 5.7 deg), and the overall level of neuronal firing activity was significantly boosted. ERF diam was measured with black vertical bar of 2x16 deg moving at 7.6 deg/s in horizontal direction. Adapted from JPE-Arch91 and data by Glagow and Ewert 1994

This leads to the assumption of the existence of an 'internal law' that seeks to maintain a physiologically acceptable balance between neural excitation and inhibition, with an appropriate emphasis on tectal intrinsic and pretectal extrinsic inhibition, in order to meet the criteria for visual pattern recognition by tectal and pre-tectal thalamic networks. To understand the underlying functions, the question arises as to what happens when the visual excitatory output of the retinal R2 and R3 neurons to both networks is significantly increased in terms of their discharge frequencies. This is possible after systemic administration of the dopamine D1,D2 receptor agonist apomorphine. Although Apo-induced enlargements of the ERFs of R2 and R3 neurons do not result in changes of size preference in prey capture, recordings from T5.2 neurons demonstrate that the basis for species-specific pattern discrimination is preserved. This is consistent with studies measuring regional energy metabolism in the brain. The [14C]-2DG method shows a corresponding pattern between strong retino-receptive tectal activities and strong retino-receptive pretectal activities whose influences 'compete' in the deep tectal efferent layers. With regard to tectomotor output, there are qualitative differences in the choice of prey capture strategy, depending on the duration of exposure and the dose of apomorphine. This includes a decrease in the rates of orienting toward prey in favor of prey snapping.

The significant role of pretecto-tectal inhibitory connections for visual configurational pattern recognition raises the question of the kind of neurotransmission. Various authors suggest that pretectally released neuropeptide Y via Y2 receptor has an evolutionarily conserved function in the modulation of visual information processing in tetrapods and may exhibit plasticity with regard to neural restructuring during phylogenetic development, for example, with regard to differences in visual pattern discrimination by modifiable (innate) release mechanisms.

Behavioral studies showed that the fire-bellied toad (Bombina orientalis) disregarded a worm-like prey dummy of black cardboard when the object traversed the visual field of toad‘s tectal lobe, on the surface of which porcine NPY had been administered, soaked in an agarose gel-pad. As this prey object passed through the visual field of the untreated tectal lobe, which was covered with a gel-pad soaked with frog-Ringer without NPY, it released prey capture. Comparable experiments measuring metabolic activity confirmed a difference in [14C]-2DG uptake in dorsal tectal layers between the NPY-treated and untreated tectal lobes. That is consistent with studies in cane toads in which excitatory tectal field potentials in response to electrical stimulation of the contralateral optic nerve were attenuated by NPY-application to the tectal surface. Fact is also that pretecto-tectal projections in frogs – originating ipsilaterally from pretectal dorsomedial and dorsolateral thalamic nuclei – release NPY which in turn suggests that NPY exerts an inhibitory influence on retino-tectal transmission: If electrical stimulation of the ipsilateral pretectal dorsomedial/lateral thalamus (in the absence of NPY) preceded an optic nerve stimulation by a delay of 15 ms, the excitatory tectal field potential to optic nerve stimulation was strongly attenuated. This allows the conclusion that NPY — released from pretecto-tectal projecting fiber terminals and signaling through Y2 receptor — acts presynaptically on retino-tectal terminals to inhibit glutamate mediated retino-tectal transmission (see also feature detection (nervous system)). In fact, spike amplitudes of retino-tectal projecting R2 and R3 ganglion cells in response to moving visual objects were reduced under NPY influence to the superficial tectal layers, thus leading to a reduced release of glutamate.

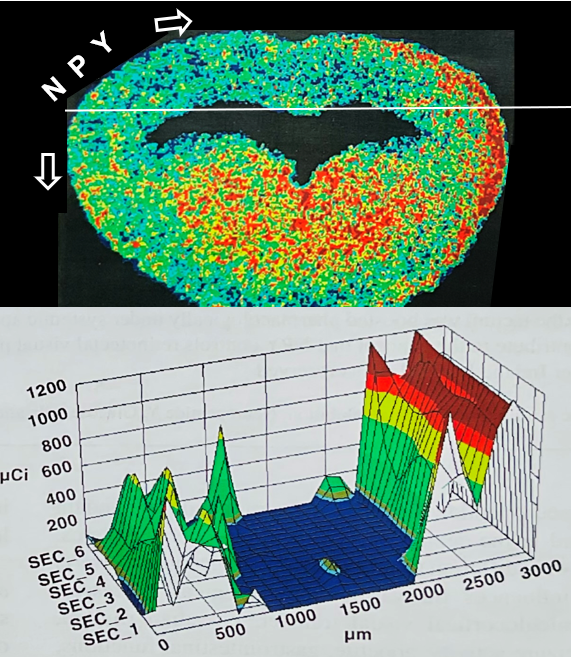
Influence of neuropeptide-Y application to the optic tectum on prey catching behavior in Bombina orientalis. Top: Transverse section through midbrain showing the left optic tectum under NPY treatment and right tectum as an untreated control. Bottom: Applying SigmaScan Pro5 software, a computer-aided densitometry ‚Automet‘ system allowed to measure in histological 15/u-sections the [14C]-2DG uptake in response to a 2mm x 24mm visual prey dummy which traversed at 8*/ s the horizontal visual fields of the left and right optic tectum (anurans have an almost complete optic chiasm). Uptake was measured in /uCi and visualized in a false-color code. The left-to-right comparison shows a strong difference in tectal glucose utilization, which is consistent with the observation that NPY application to the tectal surface leads to an inhibition of visually guided prey catching behavior.— Figure reprinted with kind permission of Elsevier, from Funke and Ewert (2006) Neuroscience Letters 392, 43-46.

The pretectal thalamic TH3 and TH4 neurons of the toad's visual system are attributed the following main functions: i) Detection of a large moving threat object and, specifically, a contrast boundary aligned transverse to the direction of its motion; ii) adaptive, configuration-dependent scaling and categorization of moving visual objects through computations and in interaction with T5.1 and T5.2 neurons, as well as producing behavioral trigger thresholds that result in sensorimotor decisions; iii) a finely tuned modulation of inhibitory processes within the optic tectum.

An important property of configurational object perception in toad vision is the “implicit computation” of contrast borders in relation to the direction of their movement. This can be regarded as a ‘trick‘ by which anuran brain evolution circumvents the need of a huge number of visual neurons with ‘asymmetric‘ receptive fields in order to “explicitly compute“ various possible contrast boundaries, as known from the visual cortex. In toads, an apparently equivalent solution is achieved by T5.2 and TH3 cells, whose excitatory receptive fields are ‘radially symmetric‘, thus enabling the calculation of contrast borders implicitly with respect to any direction of motion. That too shows how a small brain with limited neuroarchitecture can solve a hardware problem with the help of its intelligent software.

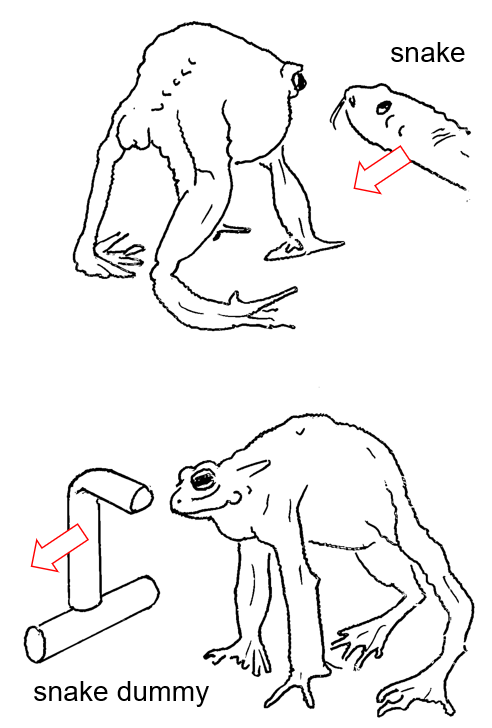
Avoidance behavior of a common toad Bufo bufo in response to a horseshoe whip snake Hemorrhois hippocrepis that, raising its front body, signals a threat (top); as well as in response to a moving dummy that mimics the snake’s characteristic threat configuration (bottom): Sides of the body that are adjusted perpendicular to the direction in which the snake or the snake dummy moves (see arrows). By inflating its lymph sacs and secreting toxins from its skin glands, the toad assumes defensive postures in which it stretches out its legs, raises its body upright and tilts its head downward: either it stands there motionless and menacing, or it dodges to the side. - Line drawings (JPE Arch2026) based on photographs by Ewert and Traud 1973

The algorithm, that relates the configurational visual object features ep (extension parallel to the direction of movement) and et (extension transverse to the direction of movement) to either harmless (e.g., prey-like) or dangerous (e.g., threatening) signals—discovered in toads —is implemented in the animal kingdom by different brain networks including the ones of the amphibious mudskipper fish Periophthalmus koelreuteri and the mantis religiosa insect Sphodromantis lineola. When a moving stimulus is presented in an anti-worm configuration, the threatened mudskipper responds additionally by erecting its dorsal fin. During aggressive confrontations among male conspecifics of the three-spined stickleback Gasterosteus aculeatus, the fish even assumes a vertical posture (in “static configuration”), with the head pointing downward, to signal a threat against a rival.

Among mammals, adopting a vertical upright posture (in "dynamic configuration") can serve as a threatening gesture toward a rival, indicating its readiness for competition, or confrontation, or the intention to avoid confrontation. Taking into account the signal transmitter and receiver, one may speculate that a key component for assigning ep/et characteristics of body posture and gait has emerged during vertebrate evolution. The link between an upright posture and bipedal locomotion — in a sense of a ‚dynamic configuration‘ — can be traced back to Homo erectus. Humans have exploited this combination in a way that far surpasses the approaches of other animal groups. The evolution of Homo sapiens was a complex process shaped by numerous factors. The upright gait and an associated threat signaling may be embedded in a phylogenetically conserved algorithm, so to speak: The effects of a visual signal that shifts from “harmless and prey-like” to “threatening”—triggered by a contrast boundary whose longitudinal orientation changes from parallel to the direction of movement to across to it— have been analyzed in the vertebrate family Bufonidae (true toads), whose origins date back to the Paleocene.

The neuroethological studies on toads in which remote-controlled, bar-shaped objects were moved as dummies representing prey or threats— suggest that the recipients of such signals possess a reliable visual pattern „recognition“ and motor pattern „trigger“ system: Rapid recognition of prey or threat configurations is invariant under changes in other stimulus parameters, such as the speed or direction of movement. In the “anti-worm” configuration, for example, an object moving slowly, quickly, or jerkily does not trigger a prey-capture response. The toad's reaction is characterized by the fact that it suddenly freezes or assumes a defensive posture in which it extends its legs and tilts its head slightly downward: a sort of threatening gesture with which the toad, in turn, may be trying to scare off its opponent.

== Releasing systems: Connecting what and where streams ==
Release (trigger) systems consist of neuronal perception circuits that recognize or localize a behaviorally significant sensory signal, also known as sign stimulus or key stimulus according to concepts introduced by Nicolaas Tinbergen (see feature detection (nervous system)). The corresponding processing streams are connected to neural pattern generators for motor skills. In common toads, two visual information processing streams are involved in the recognition and localization of prey. The visual data is transmitted via tectofugal pathways that originate in the topographic map of the retinotectal system. Both visual systems are not completely separate from each other. Stereopsis enables a correspondence between the two.

Prey recognition uses calculations in retino-tectal and retino-pretecto-tectal/thalamic networks, the results of which are transmitted via tecto-bulbar/spinal projecting axons —ultimately to the hypoglossal nucleus, which triggers the motor coordination of snapping. The strategy of catching when determining the respective distance to the prey involves a tecto-tegmental relay circuit, which mainly uses monocular depth calculations. The information obtained from the accommodation of the eye lens makes it possible to estimate distances between the toad and its prey in a range between 5 and 20 cm, data that is also used to determine the absolute size of a prey object in order to ensure size constancy. Results from recording studies of toad's medullary neurons support the assumption that prey detection and local sign carrying tectal 'command elements' converge on bulbar motor pattern generating nuclei.

As the equivalent of an innate releasing mechanism, IRM, Ewert proposes that a command releasing system for triggering prey capture includes visual command elements for prey 'recognition' (T5.2-neurons) AND visual command elements for prey 'localization' (T5.1- and T4-neurons), which control the command 'orient' toward prey. The toad video shows how fast such commands can be carried out:

• T5.2: recognized as prey AND T4 and T5.1: prey located in the peripheral visual field ——> ORIENT !

• T5.2: recognized as prey AND T1.1 and T2.2: prey located in the frontal visual field far afield ——> APPROACH !

• T5.2: recognized as prey AND T1.2: prey located binocularly at short distance ——>FIXATE !

• T5.2: recognized as prey AND T1.3 and T3: prey located binocularly in striking distance ——> SNAP !

Neuroethological research focuses on the tectal snap-evoking area, SEA, whose neurons monitor the frontal visual field of the toad. Experimental evidence of the descending nature of the T-type tectomotor projection neurons in this multiple reaction system was provided:

(a) neuroanatomically, by retrograde 'backlabelling' the cells in the SEA after applying horseradish peroxidase, HRP, to the corresponding medullary motor pattern-generating structures, such as the hypoglossal nucleus; and

(b) neurophysiologically, by recording the action potentials of SEA-cells in response to visual stimuli and by antidromic 'backfiring' these cells in response to focal electrical stimulation of the relevant motor structures. Test criteria: Discharge following ability to respond to repetitive electrical stimuli, with a constant latency response, and collision between visually and electrically triggered spikes.

In each command releasing system, both processing streams —for prey recognition and prey localization, respectively— converge when the toad has its prey within striking distance. If the head end of an earthworm stretches in a way that is difficult to handle, the toad is prompted to tilt its head accordingly and choose a practical catching method, either by flicking its tongue or grabbing with its jaws. The toad video shows in a natural stimulus situation how this binocular fixation process requires sensorimotor correspondence between configurative prey selection and object distance estimation. Since an experimental relaxation of the lens muscles with atropine had no significant effect on the accuracy of snapping in binocular toads —while one-eyed toads missed the target—it is assumed that stereopsis enables a finely tuned perception/reaction cycle during fixation.

Whether the tongue is flicked out and positioned at a right angle to the surface of the prey to gain a firm grip through adhesion, or whether the prey is seized with the jaws, depends on the visual stimulus —that is, on whether the prey object is small or large. Both perception/reaction routines can be refined through trial and error or associative individual experience, which means that a basic IRM for prey snapping can be subject to modification. Habituation toward 'sameness' in unsuccessful trials can be an important factor in the expectation of 'newness'.

== Stimulus-specific habituation: a conserved neural process ==
The study on the interaction of spatial (et) and spatio-temporal (ep) variations of contrast boundaries in the perception of prey and threat shows that toads recognize objects based on the relationship between an object's shape and its direction of movement. Can toads distinguish and memorize visual details of moving stimuli? Yes, they do. Toads perceive different black-and-white patterns within the external dimensions of a configurative worm or bug shape (e.g., of 5 mm x 20 mm). They demonstrate this through stimulus specific habituation, a type of non-associative learning. When a dummy prey of a pattern A circles around a toad in the direction of its longitudinal axis in a special experimental setup, the toad's orientation turning reactions to visually catch the prey unsuccessfully decrease due to stimulus-specific habituation until A remaines unaddressed. But if, immediately after habituation to A, another prey dummy with a different pattern B triggers (dishabituates) prey orienting, it can be concluded that the toad distinguished between A and B. If in the reverse type of experiment, the pattern A following habituation to B elicits no prey orienting, toads preferred B over A. If in both habituation series the second pattern dishabituates the prey-orienting activity to the same extent, both were discriminated and equally attractive to the toad.

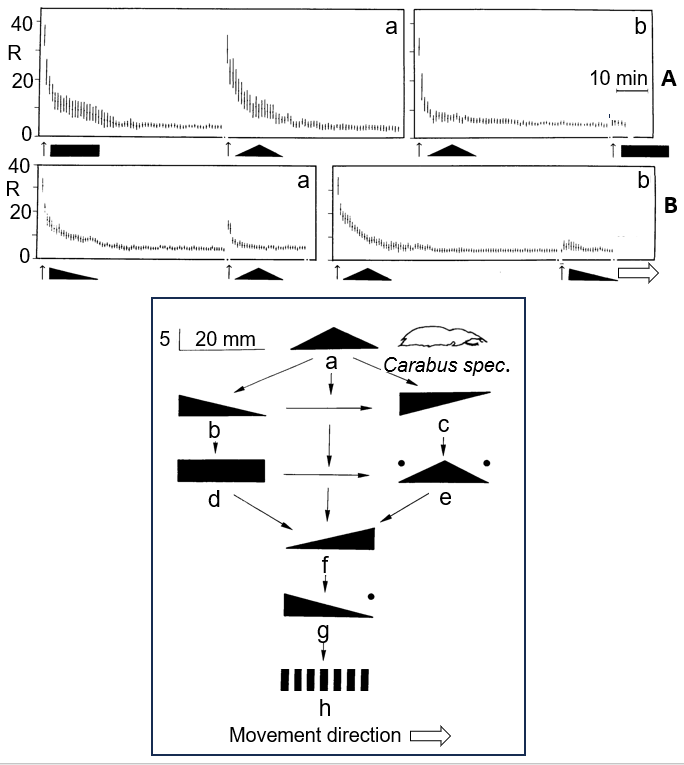
Visual stimulus-specific habituation in toads, Bufo bufo. Top, left: Habituation of the prey-capture orienting activity (R, responses toward habituation) during a stimulus series in response to a black stripe and dishabituation to a triangle. Top, right: stimulus presentation: vice versa; no dishabituation in response to the stripe stimulus. Bottom: 'Dishabituation hierarchy.' Arrows: Dishabituating efficacy see arrow direction. In pair-matching tests, as soon as the animal had become habituated to the prey dummy, it was immediately replaced with another dummy using a special electromechanical device, without the animal noticing the procedure. Further explanations see text. Modified after Ewert and Kehl 1978

Based on paired tests of different patterns, a hierarchical order (dishabituation hierarchy) of more or less salient visual cues emerged within the dimensions of a prey schema, such as: surface shapes, leading edges, isolated dots, and stripes.

While a prey dummy circles around the toad in the rotating stimulation set-up, stimulus-specific aftereffects (memory traces) apparently accumulate, causing the latency periods of the toad's successive turning reactions to become longer, which reduces the turning frequency until stimulus-specific habituation occurs. The temporal course of recovery of stimulus responses after habituation to a prey dummy suggests two types of storage: short-term in the first 5–10 minutes and long-term up to 24 hours. Dishabituation through other stimuli during recovery (such as visual threats or somatosensory stimulation of the body skin) is most effective in the short-term phase.

The brain of the common toad can distinguish and store different visual stimuli through habituation based on the functions of brain structures, for example: a) for the specificity of stimulus patterns: the optic tectum in connection with caudal dorsal thalamic structures, b) for pattern-related aftereffects and memory: the ventral medial pallium, and c) for locus specificity in relation to areas of the visual field: the retino-tectal map.

Computer simulations demonstrate a match between a model and the original experimental data on which the dishabituation hierarchy is based. Model predictions concern the processes of habituation and the function of the ventral medial pallium, vMP, and explain why habituation is abolished after experimental lesions to vMP.

Stimulus specific habituation belongs to the evolutionary 'conserved neural processes', i.e., a brain function that remains fundamentally unchanged across different species —from molluscs to mammals. The Aplysia gill and siphon withdrawal reflex of the marine snail Aplysia californica protects the gill and siphon from potentially threatening stimuli. To repeated release of this behavior with the same stimulus, the animal habituates in a stimulus-specific fashion in order to avoid wasted effort and be visually perceptive for new stimulus situations. Multidisciplinary experimental analyses of the complex molecular memory processes in sensori-motor integration of Aplysia result in the identification of a valuable model system with developments for medical application. Eric Kandel is a recipient of the 2000 Nobel Prize in Physiology/Medicine for his research on the physiological basis of memory storage in neurons.

== See also ==
- Feature detection (nervous system)
- Jörg-Peter Ewert
