= Feature detection (nervous system) =

Nervous system stimuli filtration process

Feature detection is a process by which the nervous system sorts or filters complex natural stimuli in order to extract behaviorally relevant cues that have a high probability of being associated with important objects or organisms in their environment, as opposed to irrelevant background or noise.

Feature detectors are individual neurons—or groups of neurons—in the brain which code for perceptually significant stimuli. Early in the sensory pathway feature detectors tend to have simple properties; later they become more and more complex as the features to which they respond become more and more specific.

For example, simple cells in the visual cortex of the domestic cat (Felis catus), respond to edges—a feature which is more likely to occur in objects and organisms in the environment. By contrast, the background of a natural visual environment tends to be noisy—emphasizing high spatial frequencies but lacking in extended edges. Responding selectively to an extended edge—either a bright line on a dark background, or the reverse—highlights objects that are near or very large. Edge detectors are useful to a cat, because edges do not occur often in the background "noise" of the visual environment, which is of little importance to the cat.

== History ==
Early in the history of sensory neurobiology, physiologists favored the idea that the nervous system detected specific features of stimuli, rather than faithfully copying the sensory world onto a sensory map in the brain. For example, they favored the idea that the visual system detects specific features of the visual world. This view contrasted with the metaphor that the retina acts like a camera and the brain acts like film that preserves all elements without making assumptions about what is important in the environment. It wasn't until the late 1950s that the feature detector hypothesis fully developed, and over the last fifty years, it has been the driving force behind most work on sensory systems.

Horace B. Barlow was one of the first investigators to use the concept of the feature detector to relate the receptive field of a neuron to a specific animal behavior. In 1953, H.B. Barlow's electrophysiological recordings from excised retina of the frog provided the first evidence for the presence of an inhibitory surround in the receptive field of a frog's retinal ganglion cell. In reference to "on-off" ganglion cells—which respond to both the transition from light to dark and the transition from dark to light—and also had very restricted receptive fields of visual angle (about the size of a fly at the distance that the frog could strike), Barlow stated, "It is difficult to avoid the conclusion that the 'on-off' units are matched to the stimulus and act as fly detectors". In the same year, Stephen Kuffler published in vivo evidence for an excitatory center, inhibitory surround architecture in the ganglion cells of the mammalian retina which further supported Barlow's suggestion that on-off units can code for behaviorally relevant events.

Barlow's idea that certain cells in the retina could act as "feature detectors" was influenced by E.D. Adrian and Nikolaas Tinbergen. E.D. Adrian, Barlow's advisor, was the discoverer of the frequency code—the observation that sensory nerves convey signal intensity though the frequency of their firing. On the other hand, during Barlow's career, Nikolaas Tinbergen was introducing the concept of the innate release mechanism (IRM) and sign stimulus. IRMs are hard wired mechanisms that give an animal the innate ability to recognize complex stimuli. The sign stimulus is a simple, reduced stimulus including only the necessary features of the stimulus capable of evoking a behavioral response. Tinbergen's examination of the pecking behavior in herring gull chicks illustrated that the pecking response could be evoked by any bill-shaped long rod with a red spot near the end. In his own paper, Barlow later compared a sign stimulus to a password which was either accepted or rejected by a feature detector. Accepted passwords would contain the features necessary to trigger specific behavioral responses in an animal.

In the late 1950s, Jerome Lettvin and his colleagues began to expand the feature detection hypothesis and clarify the relationship between single neurons and sensory perception. In their paper "What the Frog's Eye Tells the Frog's Brain", Lettvin et al. (1959) looked beyond the mechanisms for signal-noise discrimination in the frog's retina and were able to identify four classes of ganglion cells in the frog retina: sustained contrast detectors, net convexity detectors (or bug detectors), moving edge detectors, and net dimming detectors.

In the same year, David Hubel and Torsten Wiesel began investigating properties of neurons in the visual cortex of cats, processing in the mammalian visual system. In their first paper in 1959, Hubel and Wiesel took recordings from single cells in the striate cortex of lightly anesthetized cats. The retinas of the cats were stimulated either individually or simultaneously with spots of light of various sizes and shapes. From the analysis of these recordings, Hubel and Wiesel identified orientation-selective cells in the cat's visual cortex and generated a map of the receptive field of cortical cells. At the time, circular spots of light were used as stimuli in studies of the visual cortex. However, Hubel and Wiesel noticed that rectangular bars of light were more effective stimuli (i.e. more natural stimuli) than circular spots of light, as long as the orientation was adjusted to the correct angle appropriate for each ganglion cell. These so-called simple cells were later called bar detectors or edge detectors. While comparing the receptive fields of neurons in the cat striate cortex with the concentric "on" and "off" receptive fields identified in cat ganglion cells by Kuffler et al., Hubel and Wiesel noticed that, although "on" and "off" regions were present in the striate cortex, they were not arranged in concentric circles. From their discovery of these uniquely orienting receptive fields, Hubel and Wiesel concluded that orientation-selective cells exist within the cat's visual cortex.

In their second major paper, Hubel and Wiesel extended their technique to more complex regions in the visual cortex in an effort to understand the difference between cortical receptive fields and lateral geniculate fields. They observed that the cat striate cortex contained more cells than the lateral geniculate, and they reasoned that the cortex needs a large number of neurons to digest the large amount of information it receives. Through experimentation, they found that each neuron in the cortex is responsible for a small region of the visual field and also has its own orientation specificity. From the results of these single cell readings in the striate cortex and lateral geniculate, Hubel and Wiesel postulated that simple cortical receptive fields gain complexity and an intricate spatial arrangement through the patterned convergence of multiple "on" or "off" projections from lateral geniculate cells onto single cortical cells.

Hubel and Wiesel's investigation of the cat visual cortex sparked interest in the feature detection hypothesis and its relevance to other sensory systems. In fact, T.H. Bullock contended in 1961 that the vestibular system was being ignored by most of the contemporary sensory system research, and he suggested that the equivalent stimulation of vestibular organs may yield similarly intriguing results. Hubel and Wiesel's work also raised the question: How far does the hierarchy of visual processing go? In one answer to this question, Lettvin coined the term grandmother cells in 1969 to describe hypothetical cells that are so specific that they only fire when your grandmother's face is viewed.

== Examples ==
=== In toad vision ===
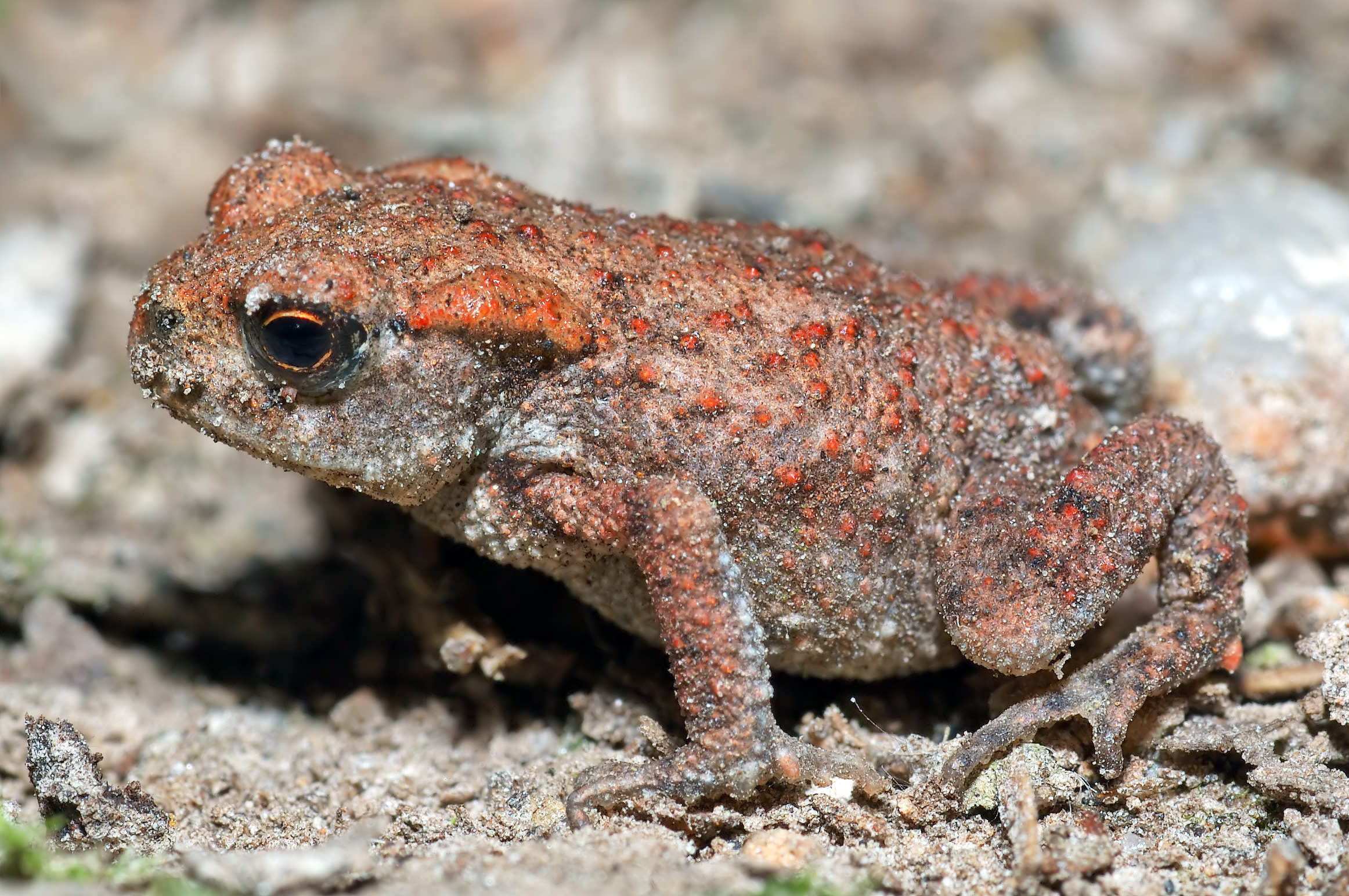
Bufo bufo, the common toad, was used in Jörg-Peter Ewert's studies of 'configurational form vision' in toads.

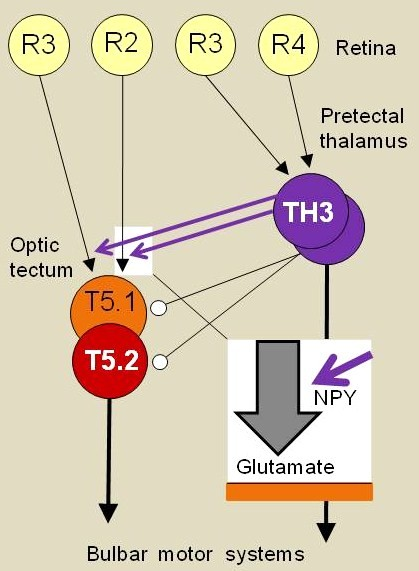
Neurons of the optic tectum are integrated in a neural macro-network in which various forebrain structures are involved; see vision in toads. The prey-selective responses of tectal T5.2 neurons may result from postsynaptic inhibitory input of pretectal thalamic neurons (cf. lines with terminal dots). Furthermore, there is ample evidence suggesting that retino-tectal glutaminergic transfer is controlled by neuropeptide Y (NPY) — released from the axonal terminals of pretectal thalamic TH3 neurons — in a manner of presynaptic inhibition via Y2 receptors. Kang & Li reported that nearly 98% of implanted tectal cells showed inhibitory responses to pretectal stimulation. (Combined after Ewert 1974 and 2004)

Jörg-Peter Ewert pioneered the study of the neuronal correlates of feature detection in toad vision. He made significant progress by taking advantage of the common toad's natural prey catching behavior.

Toads (Bufonidae) prefer to feed on arthropods such as earthworms, carabid beetles, and millipedes, whose bodies are oriented parallel to the direction of their movement. Toads avoid large objects such as the shadows of birds of prey. Snakes—the 'arch enemies' of toads—send out threatening visual signals with their body coils that are typically aligned across the snake's movement direction. These behaviorally relevant features are referred to in laboratory jargon as 'worm' and 'anti-worm.' An evolutionarily acquired anti-worm label that marks worm-like objects can protect them from prey motivated toads by 'snake mimicry,' as quantitative experiments with dummies suggest (see Vision in toads: a worm-like object that moves with a transversely arranged spot is ignored as prey).

To study toad behavior, Ewert and coworkers placed the toad in a cylindrical glass container at a fixed distance from the stimulus. They then moved a rectangular bar around the container in an effort to mimic a worm-like prey object. The toad's rate of turning toward the object was used to quantify the toad's orienting behavior. The team showed, by using spots, bars, and square stimuli of different sizes, that toads snapped at a bar which was moving in a direction parallel to its long axis, whereas the same bar oriented across the direction of movement (anti-worm configuration) was ignored as prey. Another experimental setup allowed worm or anti-worm stimuli to traverse the toad's visual field in different direction in the x-y co-ordinates, demonstrating that the worm versus anti-worm discrimination is invariant under changes in the direction of movement.

The characteristics of the moving worm (prey-like) and the moving anti-worm (threatening) are not explicitly determined by factors such as a horizontal or vertical alignment. Rather, following the conceptual framework by Nikolaas Tinbergen, these characteristics are determined by the proportion of two distinct features in their dynamic gestalt (configuration), namely the spatial extents of area parallel to vs. across the direction of movement: configurational form vision.

More precisely, configuration in this context refers to the relationship between two visual features of a moving bar: the area ep that is aligned parallel to the direction of movement (and signals prey), and the area ea (or et) that is aligned across (transverse) the direction of movement (and signals threat). The ea variation concerns spatial aspects of the visual stimulus, while the ep variation addresses both spatial and temporal aspects.

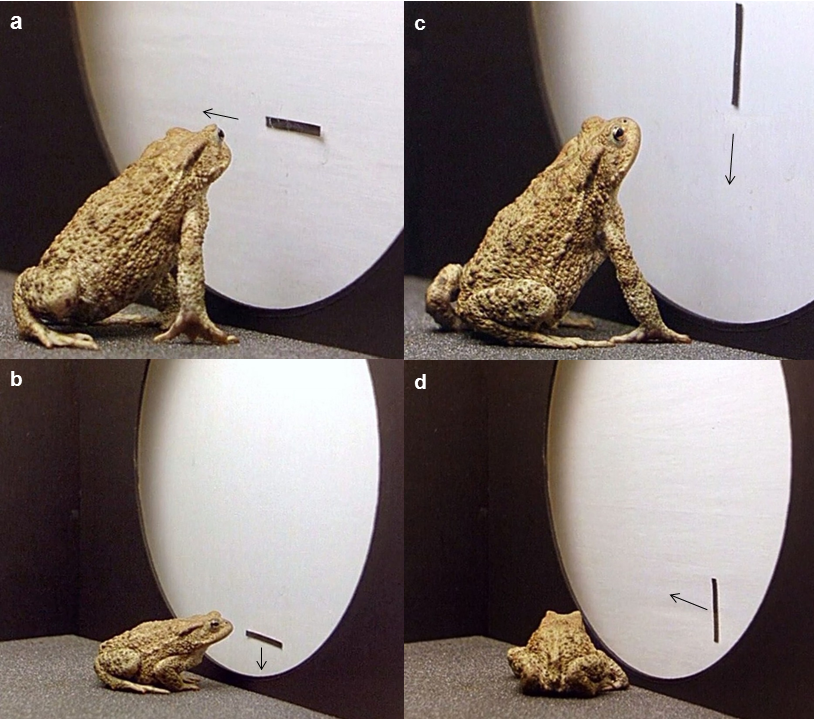
Common toads can recognize moving prey or threats based on configural features. Depending on the orientation of the longitudinal axis of a 2.5mm x 30mm black bar (used as a test stimulus attached to a conveyor belt) relative to its direction of movement (see arrow) —either parallel (a,c) or across (b,d)— the toad will respond with either prey-capture (a,c) or threat-avoidance (b,d). This behavior is invariant under changes of the direction (a or c; b or d) in which the bar traverses the animal’s field of view. - Figure reprinted from video https://doi.org/10.3203/IWF/C-1805eng with copyright CC_licenses_BY_SA_4.0_deed.de with kind permission by Leibniz-Informationszentrum Technik und Naturwissenschaften,TIB

According to Ewert (1968), the triggering effects of ep compared to ea on prey capture activity were quantitatively determined using rectangular pieces of cardboard measuring ep × ea as dummies. In each dummy, the features of ep and ea interact, resulting in a compromise that determines the size and configuration of the prey suitable for capture. In the ep,ea continuum, a worm-like moving bar (ep>ea) and an anti-worm-like moving bar (ea>ep) represent the extreme (opposite) dynamic configurations.

Out in the natural environment, at dusk in the forest, a toad sitting-still recognizes an object as prey when it moves against a stationary structured (or unstructured) background in a configuration determined by an ep/ea ratio that corresponds to the prey scheme. The accuracy of the distinction between ep and ea does not depend on whether the retinal image is caused by a moving object or by a stationary object created by the toad’s own movement— provided that the background is unstructured. Visual masking ('surround inhibition') ensures that a toad, usually walking in a structured environment, is not confused by simultaneously shifting retinal images in the size of prey, which are caused by small twigs or leaves. Once the toad is sitting still, it spots prey moving along immobile structures (see toad video and vision in toads). The movement of an object suggests to the toad that its potential prey is alive.

After the visual recognition elements of behavior were determined, Ewert and co-workers neuroethologically investigated the neuronal processes that control the toad's prey recognition using various experimental methods and found a number of feature detectors (see also neuroethology). To reiterate: Toads are specialized in visual movement perception. Their central visual system does not detect the alignment of a moving black-and-white contrast bar by comparison with a correspondingly oriented asymmetric excitatory receptive field of a bar detector, but in relation to the direction of movement of the corresponding ep/ea ratio. The T5.1 neurons of the optic tectum —which receive retinal R2 and R3 signals and encode ep— and the TH3 neurons of the pretectal thalamus —which simultaneously receive R3 and R4 signals and encode ea— exhibit radially symmetric excitatory receptive fields. Coupling the parameters ep and ea with an object’s movement direction enables each T5.2 neuron in the retinotopic map —which processes excitatory input of T5.1 and inhibitory input of TH3— to calculate an object’s ep/ea ratio for any direction in which this object traverses the toad’s visual field. This explaines the invariance of object recognition by prey-selective T5.2 neurons with respect to changes in the direction and speed at which an object is moving.

• The toad's T5.2 neurons detect visual contrast boundaries —of different orientations— that are aligned with the direction in which they are moving through their radially symmetric excitatory receptive field. Stevens (1987) dicusses this phenomenon in the context of implicit computation (toad's worm detector) versus explicit computation (cat's bar detector) (See also a systems theory approach). Stevens’ comparison aligns with the view that evolution has endowed the phylogenetically basal anuran brain with the ability to detect the orientation of moving visual contrast boundaries using an intelligent, efficient algorithm —thereby bypassing a method that uses the massive, redundant neuroarchitecture characteristic of the mammalian striate cortex.

• In a phylogenetic context, the species-specificity of configurational prey detection supports Ewert’s concept, according to which this property is implemented by the innate releasing mechanism (IRM) of the common toad’s prey catching behavior. It is an ability that juvenile toads —which have developed in the laboratory through metamorphosis from tadpoles, without any prey experience— demonstrate in a test using prey dummies. The speed and consistency with which an adult common toad in an experimental setting unfailingly distinguishes between prey and non-prey (worm/anti-worm; see toad video) speak for themselves. Interestingly, this property can be modified through associative individual experience (for details, see vision in toads). After deactivation of the brain structure involved in learning (telencephalic 'primordium hippocampi'), the species-specificity of the IRM was restored. This suggests that this IRM involves an evolutionarily conserved neuronal circuit that can be expanded under the control of prosencephalic loops without losing its fundamental function.

Of the retinal, optic tectal, and pretectal thalamic neurons examined, the best correlation between quantitatively determined stimulus responses in prey catching activity and neuronal discharge frequency was found in the tectal T5.2 neurons (see neuroethology). Specifically, the excitatory neural processes in the optic tectum, which are fed by the retina in response to moving objects that are aligned parallel to the direction of movement, determine the configurative prey sensitivity of the tectal T5.1 and T5.2 neurons. The pretectal thalamic TH3 neurons, which are excited by the retina in response to objects aligned across the direction of movement, determine a selection of objects with regard to prey recognition by tectal T5.2 neurons via various pretectal thalamic inhibitory influences and provide input (with TH4 neurons) to releasing systems that trigger threat avoidance or escape behavior.

Ewert showed that prey-catching in the toad’s visual pathway is commanded by a number of release systems, each one consisting of T5.2 prey detectors in combination with special neurons that determine the prey distance for each step of prey catching: (i) orienting toward prey, (ii) approaching prey, (ii) binocular fixating prey, and (iii) snapping (for details see vision in toads).

Having already used electrical point stimulation to identify the optic tectum as the region responsible for the prey-catching behaviors, Ewert and colleagues located and recorded from individual prey-selective neurons of the optic tectum in freely moving toads. These T5.2 neurons would increase in discharge frequency prior to an orienting or snapping behavior response. In the case of snapping behavior, the neurons would stop firing for the duration of the snap. Evidently, these neurons exhibit a preference in responses to the worm configuration of moving bar stimuli and can therefore be considered feature detectors. To get a general idea of their properties, in successive experiments various rectangular dark objects of different edge lengths traverse a toad's visual field against a bright background at constant velocity; then the discharge frequency of a T5.2 neuron towards such an object is correlated with the toad's promptness of responding with prey-capture, expressed by the response latency. Thus, prey feature detection is not an all-or-nothing condition, but rather a matter of degree: the greater an object's releasing value as a prey stimulus, the stronger is prey-selective T5.2 neuron's discharge frequency, the shorter is toad's prey-catching response latency, and the higher is the number of prey-catching responses during a period of time (prey-catching activity)—as well as vice versa.

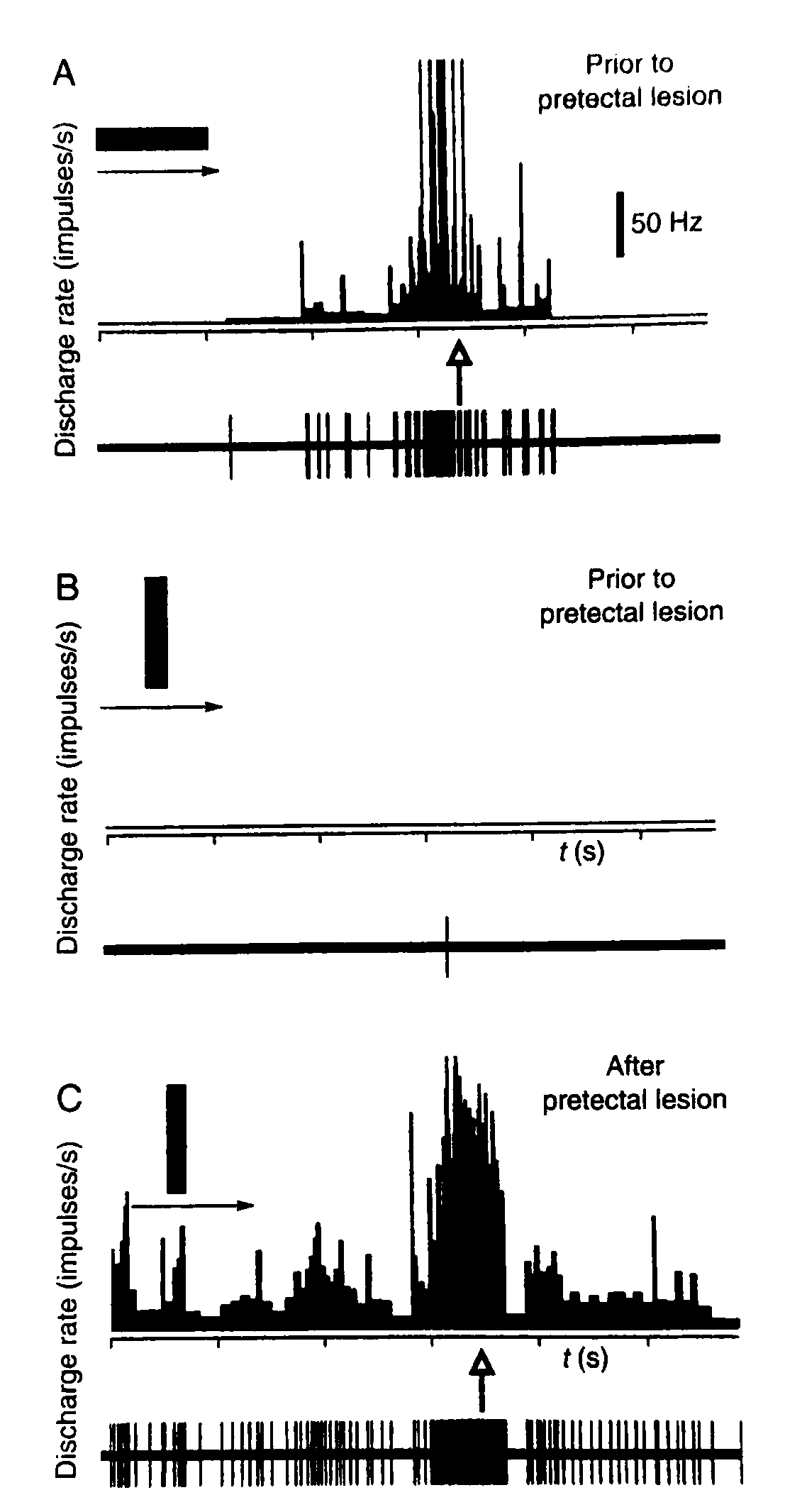
Prey-detecting T5.2 neuron recorded from the optic tectum of a freely moving toad. (A) The neuron responds to a worm-like moving bar: note the premotor increase in the discharge frequency which predicts an orienting movement by the toad to catch the prey (see vertical arrow). B) No response of the T5.2 neuron and no prey capture to the bar moving in anti-worm configuration. C) Strong discharge frequency of the same T5.2 neuron to the anti-worm stimulus is correlated with an immediate prey orienting movement after an ipsilateral pretectal thalamic high-frequency lesion applied from a second electrode. Combined according to: Schürg-Pfeiffer, Spreckelsen, Ewert 1993; Ewert, Schürg-Pfeiffer, Schwippert 1996.

The feature prey-selective is defined for toads Bufo spec.: Among moving rectangular bars and squares of different configurations — within behaviorally relevant ranges of size and speed — the worm configuration is the visual sign stimulus with the maximum trigger value.

Multiple unit recordings showed that a prey object activates several adjacent prey-selective neurons whose receptive fields partly overlap. More than one prey detecting neuron (an ensemble of neurons) —in combination with neurons which determine the local sign of the prey— will fire in the command releasing system of prey-capture (see vision in toads).

Further comparisons between the receptive fields of tectal neurons and retinal ganglion cells, classes R2 and R3, recorded in free-moving toads, revealed that size-sensitive (T5.1) and prey-selective (T5.2) tectal neurons were able to estimate the absolute size of a moving stimulus (not correlated with the diameter of the visual excitatory receptive field, ERF) while retinal ganglion cells were only able to determine the visual angular size of the stimulus (correlated with the diameter of the visual ERF). The accommodation mechanism of the lens and binocular disparity are suitable ways to estimate object distance which is prerequisite of absolute size scaling. T5.2 neurons in pharmacologically immobilized toads retain their configurational prey selective properties, but lose their sensitivity to the real size of objects. Other selective neurons observed in the optic tectum include binocular neurons, approach-sensitive neurons, and visual widefield arousal neurons with cutaneous input.

As explained above, the optic tectum is responsible for the orienting and snapping responses in prey-catching behavior; however, Ewert's research also revealed that focal electrical stimulation of the thalamic and pretectal brain regions evoked different kinds of avoidance behaviors in the toad. Feature detectors were also observed in these brain regions. Neurons were observed to be either directionally-sensitive to looming large objects, size-selective or perceptive to stationary obstacles. Certain pretectal thalamic neurons, type TH3, showed a preference for big moving objects and the anti-worm configuration of moving bar stimuli. The selectivity of tectal prey feature detectors, type T5.2, is determined by inhibitory influences of pretectal thalamic anti-worm detectors of the type TH3. Pretectal thalamic lesions impaired the prey-selectivity both in T5.2 neurons and in prey-catching behavior.

Axons from the feature sensitive/selective neurons of the optic tectum and pretectal thalamic region then contact motor structures in the medulla oblongata, thus forming sensorimotor interfaces. According to Ewert, such a sensorimotor interface may serve as the "releaser" which recognizes sensory signals of assemblies of complex feature detectors and executes the corresponding motor responses. Having analyzed neuronal processing streams in brainstem structures that translate visual sign stimuli into behavioral responses, Ewert and coworkers discovered neural loops that—in connection with different forebrain structures—modulate, e.g. modify or specify, this translation.

The toad’s telencephalic posterior ventral medial pallium (vMP), which is homologous to the hippocampus in mammals, plays an important role in the storage of information and learning. As mentioned elsewhere, the visual configurational filter properties of toads’ presumed innate release mechanism (IRM) for catching prey can be altered by associative conditioning, whereby vMP is activated and visual objects previously treated as threats release prey capture. After deactivating vMP, the species-specific selectivity of the IRM — ‘reporting back’ — dominates.

=== In weakly electric fish ===
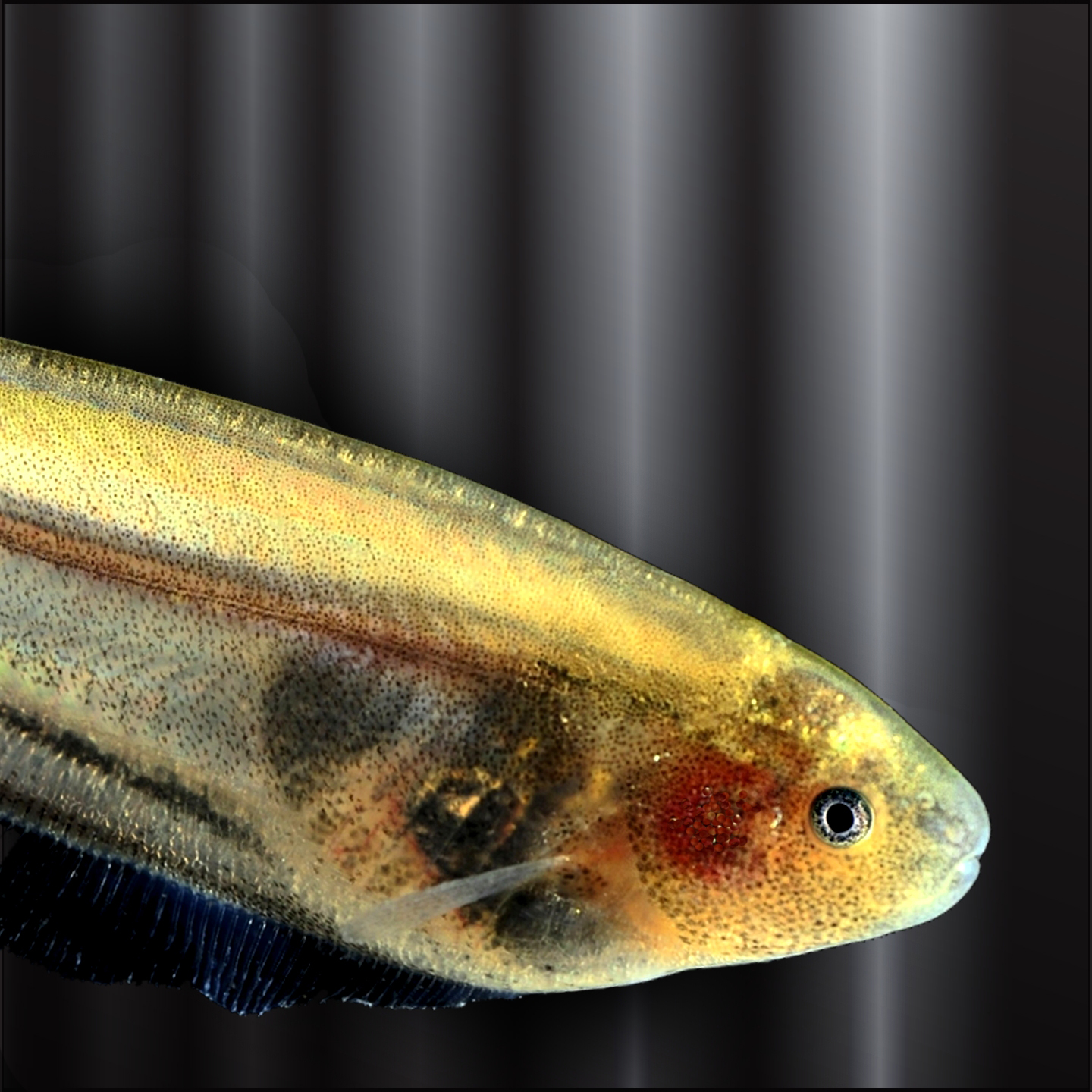
Eigenmannia virescens is a weakly electric fish which produces continuous electric discharges.

Weakly electric fish generate electric fields for the purpose of object location and communication. They have a specialized electric sense made up of tuberous and ampullary electroreceptors located over the skin surface and innervated by the electrosensory lateral line. Just like in the visual system of toads, the electrosensory system of weakly electric fish extracts features from behaviorally relevant stimuli and uses these representations to perform further processing.

In the gymnotiform fish, Eigenmannia illustrated here, the primary sensory neurons in the electroreceptor system are simple feature detectors, and they include the ampullary receptors, probability coders (P units), and phase coders (T units). P units and T units are meant to acquire information about the amplitude and phase of the stimulus, respectively, with very little processing. The P and T units differ in tuning and in threshold for evoking a single spike in response to a sinusoidal stimulus. P units have high threshold and are broadly tuned; T units have low thresholds and narrow tuning. The separate processing of information continues passed the primary sensory neurons into the electrosensory lateral-line lobe (ELL) where spherical cells relay phase or time information to higher centers and pyramidal cells code for amplitude information. As a result, we also consider the class of spherical and pyramidal cells located in the ELL to be feature detectors. More specifically, pyramidal cells are considered feature detectors that respond to the amplitude of the stimulus. One class of pyramidal cell, E-cells, respond to increases; a second, I-cells, respond to decreases in stimulus amplitude whereas all peripheral receptors are E-units.

Beyond pyramidal cells and spherical cells, a more complex feature detector exists in the dorsal torus semicurcularis of the midbrain because the separate streams of amplitude and phase information converge on higher order sign-selective neurons in this region of the midbrain. These sign-selective neurons are considered feature detectors because they fire only upon the recognition of either a positive frequency difference between a jamming signal and the fish's own signal or a negative frequency difference. Afferents from these two types of sign-selective neurons then converge at the top of the neuronal hierarchy—the pre-pacemaker nucleus, which helps to regulate the discharge frequency of the electric organ in the jamming avoidance response.

=== In bat auditory cortex ===
In the auditory system of bats, like in auditory systems of other vertebrates, primary sensory afferent neurons, which receive inputs from hair cells from a restricted region of the organ of Corti in the cochlea, are the simple feature detectors. These structures are sensitive to a restricted range of frequencies and therefore function as tuned filters. Experimentally, Nobuo Suga and his colleagues (1990) noted that various constant frequency (CF) and frequency modulated (FM) harmonics excited different parts of the basilar membrane because of the frequency difference in the call. Auditory nerve fibers take this slightly-processed sensory information to the cochlear nucleus where information either converges or diverges into parallel pathways. In Pteronotus parnellii, a CF-FM bat, these parallel pathways process CF and FM harmonics separately and contain neurons that exhibit amplitude, frequency, and harmonic selectivity. These pathways converge in the medial geniculate body—giving rise to more complex feature detectors that respond to specific combinations of CF and FM signals.

In FM-FM regions of the auditory cortex, Suga et al. (1993) identified combination-sensitive neurons which receive inputs from multiple sources. Suga observed that the FM-FM region selectively responded to an FM component (feature) in the call and in the echo. More specifically, an individual FM1-FM2 unit requires an input from a unit tuned to the FM1 frequency range and a second unit tuned to the FM2 frequency range in order to fire. These FM-FM neurons can be considered complex feature detectors because they are sensitive to a particular frequency combination and a specific time delay between the echo and call. An accurate determination of the time delay between the call and echo is critical because it allows the bat to measure the distance between itself and its prey. This FM-FM sensitive region is only one example of a feature detector in the bat auditory cortex. A CF-CF sensitive region also exists in the auditory cortex, which in combination with FM-FM regions allows the bat to create maps for relative target velocity and target distance. Tracing the responses of these combination-sensitive neurons to higher order regions of the auditory pathway reveals that there are neurons with even higher levels of frequency and amplitude selectivity.

== See also ==
- Neuroethology
- Pattern recognition (psychology)
- Vision in toads
