= Walter Heiligenberg =

German neurophysiologist (1938–1994)

- Born: January 31, 1938; Berlin, Nazi Germany (now Germany)
- Died: September 8, 1994 (aged 56); Hopewell Township, Beaver County, Pennsylvania, U.S.
- Cause of death: Plane crash (USAir Flight 427)
- Occupation: Neuroethologist

Walter F. Heiligenberg (January 31, 1938 – September 8, 1994) was a German American scientist best known for his neuroethology work on one of the best neurologically understood behavioral patterns in a vertebrate, Eigenmannia. This weakly electric fish and the neural basis for its jamming avoidance response behavioral process was the main focus of his research, and is fully explored in his 1991 book, "Neural Nets in Electric Fish."

As an international scientist, he worked alongside other neuroethologists and researchers to further explain animal behavior in a comprehensive manner and "through the application of a strict analytical and quantitative method". The advancements within neuroethology today are still largely due to his influences, as his life was dedicated to researching that which could be applicable to "all complex nervous systems" and he "[investigated] the general principles of nature".

== Life and death ==
Heiligenberg was born in Berlin, Germany, but moved to Münster soon afterwards. He then spent part of his early adulthood in Munich and Seewiesen before ultimately moving to San Diego, California, in 1972.

On September 8, 1994, Heiligenberg was killed in the crash of USAir Flight 427 while on his way to deliver a lecture at the University of Pittsburgh (Leaders in Their Fields 1994).

== Scientific background and work ==
Heiligenberg's interest in ethology started at a young age, when he met Konrad Lorenz, one of the founders of modern ethology and head of a Max Planck research group, in 1953. Through Lorenz's influence, his interest in fish and animal behavior thrived even before entering college.

He initially entered the University of Münster in 1958, but transferred to the Ludwig-Maximilians-Universität München after Lorenz and fellow neuroethologist Erich von Holst established the Max Planck Institute for Behavioral Physiology in a city approximately 20 miles from Munich, in Seewiesen (Bullock et al. 1995). Between these two colleges, his studies were spread between botany, zoology, physics, and mathematics, whose influence is clearly seen in his quantitative approaches in later research towards the neural bases of animal behavior. It was here that his ethological foundation was laid, as he "performed a quantitative analysis of the effect of motivational factors on the occurrence of various social behavioral patterns" through his doctoral thesis, "On causation of Behavioral Patterns in Cichlid Fish," which was completed in 1963 under Lorenz and Hansjochem Autrum, a sensory physiologist.

=== Academic career ===
His research continued to focus on the motivational behaviors of chiclid fish and crickets in Seewiesen, successfully conducting a quantitative demonstration of the "law of heterogeneous summation," whose model predicted that "different features of a stimulation in a [led] to an independent behavioral stimulation in the receiver". Much of his work eventually led to the testing and production of evidence contrary to Lorenz's theory of the psychohydraulic model of motivation (specifically aggression) using male Chiclidae. Such was his willingness to venture into new neuroethological territories despite the established research at the time.

His status as neuroethologist was further established when he moved to the Scripps Institution of Oceanography at the University of California, San Diego, in 1972 as a post-doctoral investigator in Theodore Holmes Bullock's laboratory. His appointment to faculty in 1973, then to the position of full professor of behavioral physiology in 1977 followed his decision to decline the position of Director at the Max Planck Institute for Behavioral Physiology in Seewiesen.

His work at UCSD led him to publish widely about the neural bases of the jamming avoidance response, the first vertebrate example of an entire behavioral pattern that could be explained from sensory input to motor output. The built-in electric organ of Eigennmania that gave millivolt discharges was found to be adaptive for location of external objects and for communication (electrolocation and electrocommunication, respectively). Heiligenberg continued to study potentially more complex social behaviors, including courtship and aggressive encounters. The decades' worth of work was expressed through the book, Neural Nets in Electric Fish, in which he explains observed phenomena of the jamming avoidance response, the nature of the electrical stimulus, the neural networks triggering them, and even explains it with respect to systems for other senses and in other species. His inclination to successfully use computational methods and modeling made him a pioneer in the neuroethology community.

=== Heiligenberg lab ===
During Heiligenberg's time at Scripps, he directed his fellow researchers and graduate students toward exploring behavioral phenomena through neuroethological methods and interests. His openness with his graduate students was notable, as he encouraged them not only to use and learn new techniques and other interests in different fields, but was also willing to allow them independently started projects and papers published without being named as a co-author.

More importantly, his personal work employed the useful aspects of both neurophysiology and ethology, whose approaches addressed the single-unit interactions and more complicated patterned processes, respectively. In his own words, his methodology was based on the belief that it would be "most promising if the behavior investigated is sufficiently simple to readily allow neurophysiological interpretations. Particularly suitable are those patterns of behavior which still function while under the restricted condition of neurophysiological experiments, since stimulus input and behavioral output can immediately be related to neuronal events".

=== Publications ===
A list of the journal articles and abstracts he helped to author at the Scripps Institution of Oceanography from 1960 to 1994, can be accessed through http://www.cnl.salk.edu/~kt/heiligref.html. There is a complete list of Heiligenberg lab publications up to 2000 in Zupanc and Bullock's 2006 article "Walter Heiligenberg: the jamming avoidance response and beyond?".

== Honors ==
Throughout Heiligenberg's lifetime, his dedication and groundbreaking research made him a leader in the neuroethology community. At the time of his death, he had already received the Javits Award from the National Institute of Neurological Diseases and Stroke, the Merit Award from the National Institute of Mental Health, and was a member of the Bavarian Academy of Science, the American Academy of Arts and Sciences, and also of the Deutsche Akademie der Naturforscher Leopoldina. Heiligenberg also received the David Sparks Prize for systems neurophysiology and served as senior editor of the Journal of Comparative Physiology (Leaders in Their Fields 1994), an added honor to being an editor for the journal since 1981. A student travel award of the International Society of Neuroethology is named in his honor.

== See also ==
- Neuroethology
- Konrad Lorenz
- Erich von Holst
- Theodore Holmes Bullock
- Cichlid
- Electric fish
- Max Planck Institute for Behavioral Physiology
- Scripps Institution of Oceanography

== Sources ==
- "Leaders in Their Fields, From Science to Business, Who Died in USAir Crash; Walter Heiligenberg, Scientist, 56". The New York Times. September 11, 1994.
- Autrum, H. (1994). "Walter Heiligenberg, 31.1.1938 to 8.9.1994". Journal of Comparative Physiology A. 175 (6): 675. doi:10.1007/BF00191839. S2CID 20128895.
- Bullock, Theodore; Cicourel, Aaron V.; Northcutt, Glenn (1995). "Walter F. Heiligenberg, Physiology: San Diego. 1995, University of California: In Memoriam".
- Carr, Catherine (1994). "Walter Heiligenberg". Journal of Computational Neuroscience. 1 (4): 263–264. doi:10.1007/BF00961875. S2CID 20189558.
- Heiligenberg, Walter (1969). "The effect of stimulus chirps on a cricket's chirping (Acheta domesticus)". Z Vergl Physiol. 65 (65): 70–97. doi:10.1007/BF00297990. S2CID 20875424.
- Heiligenberg, Walter (1965). "A quantitative analysis of digging movements and their relationship to aggressive behaviour in cichlids". Animal Behaviour. 13 (13): 163–170. Bibcode:1965AnBeh..13..163H. doi:10.1016/0003-3472(65)90087-4.
- Heiligenberg, Walter (1977). Principles of Electrolocation and Jamming Avoidance in Electric Fish: A Neuroethological Approach. New York: Springer Verlag.
- Heiligenberg, Walter (1991). Neural Nets in Electric Fish. Cambridge: MIT Press. ISBN 978-0-262-08203-7.
- Moortgat, K. T. (2022). "The Heiligenberg Lab". Archived from the original on 2007-12-04.
- Webster, Bayard (November 16, 1982). "Electric Messages Beneath the Sea". The New York Times.
- Zupanc, Gunther K. H. (2004). Behavioral Neurobiology: An integrative approach. Oxford: Oxford University Press.
- Zupanc, Gunther K. H.; Bullock, Theodore H. (2006). "Walter Heiligenberg: the jamming avoidance response and beyond". Journal of Comparative Physiology A. 192 (6): 561–572. doi:10.1007/s00359-006-0098-5. PMID 16645884. S2CID 6878060.
