= Wolfgang Wickler =

German zoologist (1931–2024)

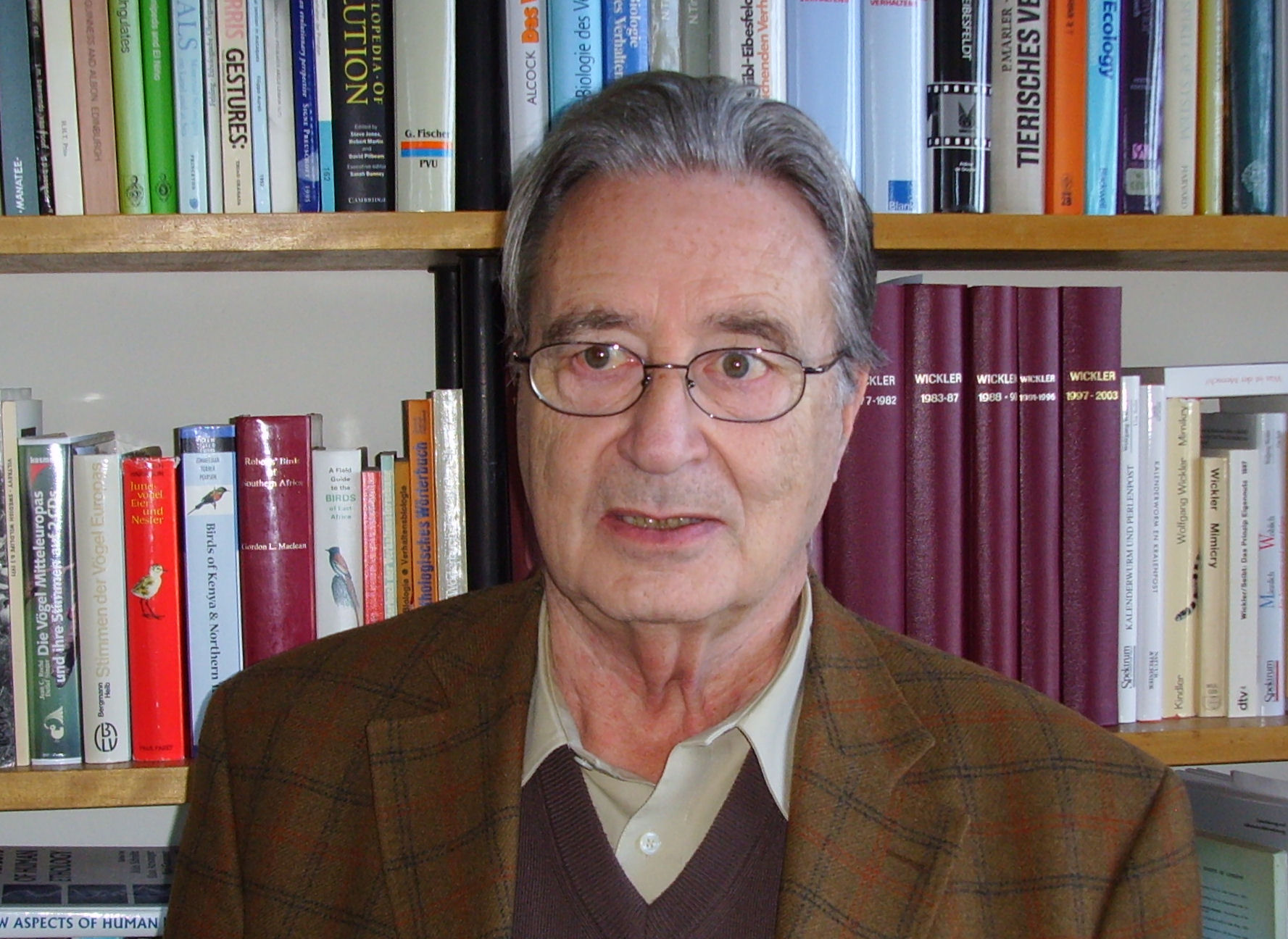
- Wickler in 2009
- Born: 18 November 1931; Berlin, Brandenburg, Prussia, Germany
- Died: 12 January 2024 (aged 92)
- Education: LMU Munich
- Known for: Mimicry
- Spouse: Agnes Oehm
- Scientific career
- Fields: Ethology, Sociobiology
- Workplaces: Max Planck Institute, LMU Munich
- Thesis: Behavior of Fish

Wolfgang Wickler (18 November 1931 – 12 January 2024) was a German zoologist, behavioral researcher and author. He led the ethological department of the Max Planck Institute for Behavioral Physiology from 1974, and he took over as director of the institute in 1975. Even after he was given emeritus status, he remained closely associated to the institute in Seewiesen and ensured its smooth transition under the newly created Max Planck Institute for Ornithology.

== Career ==
After finishing secondary school in 1951, Wickler studied biology and then received a grant to go to the Max Planck Institute for Behavioral Physiology, where he was a student of Konrad Lorenz and Erich von Holst. After he completed his doctoral work on the behavior of fish, he was scientific assistant in Seewiesen as of 1960 and finally qualified to become a professor at LMU Munich in 1969. He was also appointed to be a professor in the faculty of natural sciences there in 1976. By 1970, he was a lecturer in the Catholic theological faculty for the biological foundations of human moral concepts.

Wickler's area of specialisation was the reconstruction of racial history of animal communities and the analysis of communication of animals. Among other areas, he investigated the "dialects" of birds, and he also wrote a book about mimicry in 1968 which was the only book on the subject in the German language until 2002. Other research fields of his department at the Max Planck Institute for Behavioral Physiology were studies about the social behavior of spiders and grasshoppers, about acquisition of food, reproduction and mating of prawns, as well as rather philosophical publications on "biological explanation" in connection with ethical questions (such as "Die Biologie der zehn Gebote", The Biology of the Ten Commandments, in 1971).

Wickler received great attention in the broad public in 1981 with the sociobiologically shaped book, "Das Prinzip Eigennutz" (The Principle of Self-Interest), which Wickler wrote with Ute Seibt, as well as the book, "Männlich – weiblich. Ein Naturgesetz und seine Folgen" (Male - Female, a Natural Law and its Consequences), also written with Ute Seibt in 1983. The focal point of both books was the evolution of behavior. The central question was formulated as, "How must the behavior of living things have been formed, if the theory of evolution is correct?" (from the foreword to "Das Prinzip Eigennutz"). Although their books did not deny cultural influences on human behavior, they were reproached for taking these influences into consideration marginally, at most. It is extremely unusual that new editions several of his books continue to be published, decades after their first publications.

In November 1997, the council of the Max Planck Society decided to close the Max Planck Institute for Behavioral Physiology, with the retirement of Prof. Wolfgang Wickler on 30 November 1999. Its ornithological research has been continued in the Max Planck Institute for Ornithology (in Erling-Andechs, Radolfzell and Seewiesen).

Along with the former Bonn behavioral biologist, Hanna-Maria Zippelius, Wolfgang Wickler was one of the most aggressive critics of the instinct theory of his mentor, Konrad Lorenz.

Wolfgang Wickler was married to Agnes Oehm from 1956, had four grown children and was also active as an organist. He died on 12 January 2024, at the age of 92.

== Selected publications ==
- Wickler, W.: Mimikry. Nachahmung und Täuschung in der Natur. Munich: 1968. in German

— Mimicry in Plants and Animals (Translated by R. D. Martin) McGraw-Hill, New York: 1968. ISBN 0-07-070100-8

- Wickler, W.: Sind wir Sünder?: Naturgesetze d. Ehe. With intro. by Konrad Lorenz. Munich: 1969. in German
- Wickler, W.: Antworten der Verhaltensforschung. Munich: 1970. in German
- Wickler, W.: Verhalten und Umwelt. Hoffmann und Campe Verlag, Hamburg: 1972. in German
- Wickler, W. and Seibt, U. (publ.): Vergleichende Verhaltensforschung (Reader). Hamburg: 1973. in German
- Wickler, W.: Stammesgeschichte und Ritualisierung. Zur Entstehung tierischer und menschlicher Verhaltensmuster. Munich: 1975. in German
- Wickler, W.: Die Biologie der Zehn Gebote. Warum die Natur für uns kein Vorbild ist. Munich: 1991 (new edition). in German

— The Biology of the Ten Commandments (Translated by David Smith) New York, McGraw-Hill: 1972). ISBN 0-07-073758-4.

- Wickler, W. and Seibt, U.: Das Prinzip Eigennutz. Zur Evolution sozialen Verhaltens. Munich / Zurich: 1991 (new edition). in German
- Wickler, W. and Seibt, U.: Männlich Weiblich. Ein Naturgesetz und seine Folgen. Heidelberg / Berlin: 1998 (new edition). in German
- Wickler, W. and Seibt, U.: Kalenderwurm und Perlenpost. Biologen entschlüsseln ungeschriebene Botschaften. Heidelberg / Berlin: 1998. in German
