= Sensory maps and brain development =

Neuroethology concept

Sensory maps and brain development is a concept in neuroethology that links the development of the brain over an animal’s lifetime with the fact that there is spatial organization and pattern to an animal’s sensory processing. Sensory maps are the representations of sense organs as organized maps in the brain, and it is the fundamental organization of processing. Sensory maps are not always close to an exact topographic projection of the senses. The fact that the brain is organized into sensory maps has wide implications for processing, such as that lateral inhibition and coding for space are byproducts of mapping. The developmental process of an organism guides sensory map formation; the details are yet unknown. The development of sensory maps requires learning, long term potentiation, experience-dependent plasticity, and innate characteristics. There is significant evidence for experience-dependent development and maintenance of sensory maps, and there is growing evidence on the molecular basis, synaptic basis and computational basis of experience-dependent development.

== Sensory maps ==
List of known sensory maps:

- Somatotopic maps: homunculus, rat barrel cortex, star-nose mole nose
- Retino-topic maps: visual field position, orientation, direction, spatial frequency
- Tonotopic maps: interaural time difference, frequency tonotopic maps of the cochlea

== Computational maps ==
The computational map is the “key building block in the infrastructure of information processing by the nervous system.” Computation defined as the transformation in the representation of information is the essence of brain function. Computational maps are involved in processing sensory information and motor programming, and they contain derived information that is accessible to higher-order processing regions. The first computational map to be proposed was the Jeffress model (1948) which stated that the computation of sound localization was dependent upon timing differences of sensory input. Since the introduction of the Jeffress model, more general guiding principles for relating brain maps to the properties of the computations they perform have been proposed. One of the proposed models is that computations are distributed across parallel processors like computers; with this model, computer processing is a model for computations performed by the brain. More recently, the “elastic net” model has been proposed after studying how the primary visual cortex overlaps multiple visual maps, such as visual field position, orientation, direction, ocular dominance, and spatial frequency. The elastic net uses parallel algorithms to analyze the visual field and allows for optimized trade-off between coverage and continuity.

== Role of plasticity in map development ==
Maps are highly plastic and can be greatly altered depending on sensory experience. Long term potentiation is the primary mechanism by which plasticity occurs. Sequential firing induces a pattern of LTP that shifts the coded location, and behaviorally generated modifications of synaptic strengths subsequently affect behavior. Experience is crucial in maintaining maps. Experiments with the rat barrel cortex have shown that changes in the pattern of sensory activity can alter configuration of cortical receptive fields; if a particular whisker gets directed stimulus, the cortex will reflect the directed stimulus. Disruptions in sensory maps reflect actual discontinuities in the receptor sheet, and evoked and spontaneous neural activity instruct variable features of sensory maps.

== Theory of map formation ==
Sensory maps are formed largely by experience. Basic wiring of the brain is established in vivo by a variety of molecular guidance cues, and the wiring is then refined by patterns of neural activity based in sensory experience. For synchronization of multiple maps, replay of sensory input in circuits allows neurons to be organized into vertical topographic functional units before horizontal integration. Neurons become specialized: in the big brown bat, delay-tuned neurons encode a target range and act as probability encoders, and this comes from experience. In the owl, auditory units responded to specific locations in space, and units were arranged systematically according to the relative locations of their receptive fields, thereby creating a physiological map of auditory space. The receptive fields of the neurons found in the midbrain auditory nucleus had receptive fields independent of nature and intensity of the sound.

== Molecular basis ==
Roger Sperry proposed a chemical gradient model for eye rotation and for neuronal wiring diagram. Retinal neurons and target cells had identification tags in the form of chemical gradients so that the projection of neurons would be orderly. For a topographic map of the visual world, the map first forms during neural development via molecular signals, such as chemospecific matching between molecular gradients. The molecular basis of sensory maps and brain development is a field that is being actively explored. The most recent work has shown that gamma oscillations of neurons synchronize the development of the thalamus and cortex in young rats.
