= Sylvie Doublié =

American structural biologist

- Education: University of Paris
- Scientific career
- Fields: Biochemistry, X-ray crystallography, DNA Repair
- Workplaces: University of Paris; University of North Carolina at Chapel Hill; European Molecular Biology Laboratory, Grenoble; Harvard Medical School; University of Vermont
- Thesis: 2.9 angstrom crystal structure of Bacillus stearothermophilus tryptophanyl-tRNA synthetase complexed to its adenylate, tryptophanyl-5'AMP (1993)
- Doctoral advisors: Charles W. Carter, Jr.
- Other academic advisors: Stephen A. Cusack; Tom Ellenberger
- Website: University of Vermont, Sylvie Doublié

Sylvie Doublié is the Green and Gold Professor in the Department of Microbiology and Molecular Genetics at the University of Vermont Robert Larner College of Medicine. Doublié is a structural biologist and biochemist who has worked on DNA replication, DNA repair, and messenger RNA (mRNA) processing. She is an elected member (2013) of the Vermont Academy of Sciences and a member of the academy's board of directors.

== Education and career ==
Doublié received B.S. (Biological Sciences) and M.Sci. (Biochemistry) degrees (1985) from Paris-East Créteil University, and an advanced degree (Biological Crystallography, 1988) at Paris-Sud University, Orsay. She received a Ph.D. (Biochemistry and Biophysics, 1993) at the University of North Carolina at Chapel Hill, followed by postdoctoral work at the European Molecular Biology Laboratory in Grenoble, France and then at Harvard Medical School.

After joining the Robert Larner College of Medicine at the University of Vermont in 1998, Doublié was awarded a Pew Biomedical Scholarship (2000) from The Pew Charitable Trusts. She now holds the inaugural endowed Green and Gold Professorship in the Department of Microbiology and Molecular Genetics.

== Research ==
Doublié's research includes the high-resolution crystal structure of T7 DNA polymerase with DNA and nucleotide. She obtained an initial structure of a replicative DNA polymerase bound to an abasic site, allowing visualization of intermediate steps as DNA travels from the polymerase to the proofreading site. She was the earliest to solve a crystal structure of a mammalian poly(A) polymerase for mRNA. Her work on mammalian mRNA cleavage factor Im (CFIm) provided insight into RNA recognition, RNA looping and the role of CFIm in alternative polyadenylation. She solved the crystal structures of several DNA glycosylase enzymes that scan the genome, recognizing and excising damaged DNA bases specifically among a sea of normal bases. Doublié's research group determined the crystal structure of any endonuclease VIII family glycosylase bound to an oxidized DNA lesion. The work showed that in this class of enzymes, lesion recognition happens before the damaged base is everted. She obtained the initial structure of the polymerase domain of the human DNA repair enzyme DNA polymerase θ. This showed that lesion bypass activity is linked to the ability of the polymerase to grip the primer 3’ end tightly. Her description of methods for selenomethionine substitution in structure determination by X-ray crystallography is highly cited. Doublié edited a two-volume book series on protocols for macromolecular crystallography.

== Honors and Selected Positions ==
- Pew Scholar, The Pew Charitable Trust
- Board of Scientific Counselors, National Institute of Environmental Health Sciences, 2017–2021
- Board of Directors, The Vermont Academy of Sciences
