= Neuroethology =

Study of animal behavior and its underlying mechanistic control by the nervous system

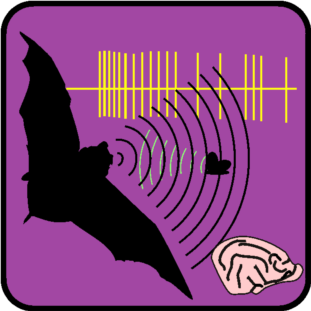
Echolocation in bats is one model system in neuroethology.

Neuroethology is the evolutionary and comparative approach to the study of animal behavior and its underlying mechanistic control by the nervous system. It is an interdisciplinary science that combines both neuroscience (study of the nervous system) and ethology (study of animal behavior in natural conditions). A central theme of neuroethology, which differentiates it from other branches of neuroscience, is its focus on behaviors that have been favored by natural selection (e.g., finding mates, navigation, locomotion, and predator avoidance) rather than on behaviors that are specific to a particular disease state or laboratory experiment.

Neuroethologists hope to uncover general principles of the nervous system from the study of animals with exaggerated or specialized behaviors. They endeavor to understand how the nervous system translates biologically relevant stimuli into natural behavior. For example, many bats are capable of echolocation which is used for prey capture and navigation. The auditory system of bats is often cited as an example for how acoustic properties of sounds can be converted into a sensory map of behaviorally relevant features of sounds.

== Scope ==
Neuroethology is an integrative approach to the study of animal behavior that draws upon several disciplines. Its approach stems from the theory that animals' nervous systems have evolved to address problems of sensing and acting in certain environmental niches and that their nervous systems are best understood in the context of the problems they have evolved to solve. In accordance with Krogh's principle, neuroethologists often study animals that are "specialists" in the behavior the researcher wishes to study e.g. honeybees and social behavior, bat echolocation, owl sound localization, etc.

The scope of neuroethological inquiry might be summarized by Jörg-Peter Ewert, a pioneer of neuroethology, when he considers the types of questions central to neuroethology in his 1980 introductory text to the field:

1. How are stimuli detected by an organism?
2. How are environmental stimuli in the external world represented in the nervous system?
3. How is information about a stimulus acquired, stored and recalled by the nervous system?
4. How is a behavioral pattern encoded by neural networks?
5. How is behavior coordinated and controlled by the nervous system?
6. How can the ontogenetic development of behavior be related to neural mechanisms?

Often central to addressing questions in neuroethology are comparative methodologies, drawing upon knowledge about related organisms' nervous systems, anatomies, life histories, behaviors and environmental niches. While it is not unusual for many types of neurobiology experiments to give rise to behavioral questions, many neuroethologists often begin their research programs by observing a species' behavior in its natural environment. Other approaches to understanding nervous systems include the systems identification approach, popular in engineering. The idea is to stimulate the system using a non-natural stimulus with certain properties. The system's response to the stimulus may be used to analyze the operation of the system. Such an approach is useful for linear systems, but the nervous system is notoriously nonlinear, and neuroethologists argue that such an approach is limited. This argument is supported by experiments in the auditory system, which show that neural responses to complex sounds, like social calls, can not be predicted by the knowledge gained from studying the responses due to pure tones (one of the non-natural stimuli favored by auditory neurophysiologists). This is because of the non-linearity of the system.

Modern neuroethology is largely influenced by the research techniques used. Neural approaches are necessarily very diverse, as is evident through the variety of questions asked, measuring techniques used, relationships explored, and model systems employed. Techniques utilized since 1984 include the use of intracellular dyes, which make maps of identified neurons possible, and the use of brain slices, which bring vertebrate brains into better observation through intracellular electrodes (Hoyle 1984). Currently, other fields toward which neuroethology may be headed include computational neuroscience, molecular genetics, neuroendocrinology and epigenetics. The existing field of neural modeling may also expand into neuroethological terrain, due to its practical uses in robotics. In all this, neuroethologists must use the right level of simplicity to effectively guide research towards accomplishing the goals of neuroethology.

Critics of neuroethology might consider it a branch of neuroscience concerned with 'animal trivia'. Though neuroethological subjects tend not to be traditional neurobiological model systems (i.e. Drosophila, C. elegans, or Danio rerio), neuroethological approaches emphasizing comparative methods have uncovered many concepts central to neuroscience as a whole, such as lateral inhibition, coincidence detection, and sensory maps. The discipline of neuroethology has also discovered and explained the only vertebrate behavior for which the entire neural circuit has been described: the electric fish jamming avoidance response. Beyond its conceptual contributions, neuroethology makes indirect contributions to advancing human health. By understanding simpler nervous systems, many clinicians have used concepts uncovered by neuroethology and other branches of neuroscience to develop treatments for devastating human diseases.

== History ==
Neuroethology owes part of its existence to the establishment of ethology as a unique discipline within zoology. Although animal behavior had been studied since the time of Aristotle (384–342 BC), it was not until the early twentieth century that ethology finally became distinguished from natural science (a strictly descriptive field) and ecology. The main catalysts behind this new distinction were the research and writings of Konrad Lorenz and Niko Tinbergen.

Konrad Lorenz was born in Austria in 1903, and is widely known for his contribution of the theory of fixed action patterns (FAPs): endogenous, instinctive behaviors involving a complex sequence of movements that are triggered ("released") by a certain kind of stimulus. This sequence always proceeds to completion, even if the original stimulus is removed. It is also species-specific and performed by nearly all members. Lorenz constructed his famous "hydraulic model" to help illustrate this concept, as well as the concept of action specific energy, or drives.

Niko Tinbergen was born in the Netherlands in 1907 and worked closely with Lorenz in the development of the FAP theory; their studies focused on the egg retrieval response of nesting geese. Tinbergen performed extensive research on the releasing mechanisms of particular FAPs, and used the bill-pecking behavior of baby herring gulls as his model system. This led to the concept of the supernormal stimulus. Tinbergen is also well known for his four questions that he believed ethologists should be asking about any given animal behavior; among these is that of the mechanism of the behavior, on a physiological, neural and molecular level, and this question can be thought of in many regards as the keystone question in neuroethology. Tinbergen also emphasized the need for ethologists and neurophysiologists to work together in their studies, a unity that has become a reality in the field of neuroethology.

Unlike behaviorism, which studies animals' reactions to non-natural stimuli in artificial, laboratory conditions, ethology sought to categorize and analyze the natural behaviors of animals in a field setting. Similarly, neuroethology asks questions about the neural bases of naturally occurring behaviors, and seeks to mimic the natural context as much as possible in the laboratory.

Although the development of ethology as a distinct discipline was crucial to the advent of neuroethology, equally important was the development of a more comprehensive understanding of neuroscience. Contributors to this new understanding were the Spanish Neuroanatomist, Ramon y Cajal (born in 1852), and physiologists Charles Sherrington, Edgar Adrian, Alan Hodgkin, and Andrew Huxley. Charles Sherrington, who was born in Great Britain in 1857, is famous for his work on the nerve synapse as the site of transmission of nerve impulses, and for his work on reflexes in the spinal cord. His research also led him to hypothesize that every muscular activation is coupled to an inhibition of the opposing muscle. He was awarded a Nobel Prize for his work in 1932 along with Lord Edgar Adrian who made the first physiological recordings of neural activity from single nerve fibers.

Alan Hodgkin and Andrew Huxley (born 1914 and 1917, respectively, in Great Britain), are known for their collaborative effort to understand the production of action potentials in the giant axons of squid. The pair also proposed the existence of ion channels to facilitate action potential initiation, and were awarded the Nobel Prize in 1963 for their efforts.

As a result of this pioneering research, many scientists then sought to connect the physiological aspects of the nervous and sensory systems to specific behaviors. These scientists – Karl von Frisch, Erich von Holst, and Theodore Bullock – are frequently referred to as the "fathers" of neuroethology. Neuroethology did not really come into its own, though, until the 1970s and 1980s, when new, sophisticated experimental methods allowed researchers such as Masakazu Konishi, Walter Heiligenberg, Jörg-Peter Ewert, and others to study the neural circuits underlying verifiable behavior.

== Modern neuroethology ==
The International Society for Neuroethology represents the present discipline of neuroethology, which was founded on the occasion of the NATO-Advanced Study Institute "Advances in Vertebrate Neuroethology" (August 13–24, 1981) organized by J.-P. Ewert, D.J. Ingle and R.R. Capranica, held at the University of Kassel in Hofgeismar, Germany (cf. report Trends in Neurosci. 5:141-143,1982; see also conference proceedings: https://doi.org/10.1007/978-1-4684-4412-4). Its first president was Theodore H. Bullock. The society has met every three years since its first meeting in Tokyo in 1986.

Its membership draws from many research programs around the world; many of its members are students and faculty members from medical schools and neurobiology departments from various universities. Modern advances in neurophysiology techniques have enabled more exacting approaches in an ever-increasing number of animal systems, as size limitations are being dramatically overcome. Survey of the most recent (2007) congress of the ISN meeting symposia topics gives some idea of the field's breadth:

- Comparative aspects of spatial memory (rodents, birds, humans, bats)
- Influences of higher processing centers in active sensing (primates, owls, electric fish, rodents, toads)
- Animal signaling plasticity over many time scales (electric fish, frogs, birds)
- Song production and learning in passerine birds
- Primate sociality
- Optimal function of sensory systems (flies, moths, toads, frogs, fish)
- Neuronal complexity in behavior (insects, computational)
- Contributions of genes to behavior (Drosophila, honeybees, zebrafish)
- Eye and head movement (crustaceans, humans, robots)
- Hormonal actions in brain and behavior (rodents, primates, fish, frogs, and birds)
- Cognition in insects (honeybee)

== Application to technology ==
Neuroethology can help create advancements in technology through an advanced understanding of animal behavior. Model systems were generalized from the study of simple and related animals to humans. For example, the neuronal cortical space map discovered in bats, a specialized champion of hearing and navigating, elucidated the concept of a computational space map. In addition, the discovery of the space map in the barn owl led to the first neuronal example of the Jeffress model. This understanding is translatable to understanding spatial localization in humans, a mammalian relative of the bat. Today, knowledge learned from neuroethology are being applied in new technologies. For example, Randall Beer and his colleagues used algorithms learned from insect walking behavior to create robots designed to walk on uneven surfaces (Beer et al.). Neuroethology and technology contribute to one another bidirectionally.

Neuroethologists seek to understand the neural basis of a behavior as it would occur in an animal's natural environment but the techniques for neurophysiological analysis are lab-based, and cannot be performed in the field setting. This dichotomy between field and lab studies poses a challenge for neuroethology. From the neurophysiology perspective, experiments must be designed for controls and objective rigor, which contrasts with the ethology perspective – that the experiment be applicable to the animal's natural condition, which is uncontrolled, or subject to the dynamics of the environment. An early example of this is when Walter Rudolf Hess developed focal brain stimulation technique to examine a cat's brain controls of vegetative functions in addition to other behaviors. Even though this was a breakthrough in technological abilities and technique, it was not used by many neuroethologists originally because it compromised a cat's natural state, and, therefore, in their minds, devalued the experiments' relevance to real situations.

When intellectual obstacles like this were overcome, it led to a golden age of neuroethology, by focusing on simple and robust forms of behavior, and by applying modern neurobiological methods to explore the entire chain of sensory and neural mechanisms underlying these behaviors (Zupanc 2004). New technology allows neuroethologists to attach electrodes to even very sensitive parts of an animal such as its brain while it interacts with its environment. The founders of neuroethology ushered this understanding and incorporated technology and creative experimental design. Since then even indirect technological advancements such as battery-powered and waterproofed instruments have allowed neuroethologists to mimic natural conditions in the lab while they study behaviors objectively. In addition, the electronics required for amplifying neural signals and for transmitting them over a certain distance have enabled neuroscientists to record from behaving animals performing activities in naturalistic environments. Emerging technologies can complement neuroethology, augmenting the feasibility of this valuable perspective of natural neurophysiology.

Another challenge, and perhaps part of the beauty of neuroethology, is experimental design. The value of neuroethological criteria speak to the reliability of these experiments, because these discoveries represent behavior in the environments in which they evolved. Neuroethologists foresee future advancements through using new technologies and techniques, such as computational neuroscience, neuroendocrinology, and molecular genetics that mimic natural environments.

== Case studies ==
=== Jamming avoidance response ===
In 1963, Akira Watanabe and Kimihisa Takeda discovered the behavior of the jamming avoidance response in the knifefish Eigenmannia sp. In collaboration with T.H. Bullock and colleagues, the behavior was further developed. Finally, the work of W. Heiligenberg expanded it into a full neuroethology study by examining the series of neural connections that led to the behavior. Eigenmannia is a weakly electric fish that can generate electric discharges through electrocytes in its tail. Furthermore, it has the ability to electrolocate by analyzing the perturbations in its electric field. However, when the frequency of a neighboring fish's current is very close (less than 20 Hz difference) to that of its own, the fish will avoid having their signals interfere through a behavior known as Jamming Avoidance Response. If the neighbor's frequency is higher than the fish's discharge frequency, the fish will lower its frequency, and vice versa. The sign of the frequency difference is determined by analyzing the "beat" pattern of the incoming interference which consists of the combination of the two fish's discharge patterns.

Neuroethologists performed several experiments under Eigenmannia's natural conditions to study how it determined the sign of the frequency difference. They manipulated the fish's discharge by injecting it with curare which prevented its natural electric organ from discharging. Then, an electrode was placed in its mouth and another was placed at the tip of its tail. Likewise, the neighboring fish's electric field was mimicked using another set of electrodes. This experiment allowed neuroethologists to manipulate different discharge frequencies and observe the fish's behavior. From the results, they were able to conclude that the electric field frequency, rather than an internal frequency measure, was used as a reference. This experiment is significant in that not only does it reveal a crucial neural mechanism underlying the behavior but also demonstrates the value neuroethologists place on studying animals in their natural habitats.

=== Feature analysis in toad vision ===
The recognition of prey and predators in the toad was first studied in depth by Jörg-Peter Ewert (Ewert 1974, 2004; see also Carew 2000, Zupanc 2004). In the early 1960s, he began by analyzing the natural prey-catching behavior of the common toad (Bufo bufo) and concluded that the animal followed a sequence that consisted of orientational head and body turning, stalking, binocular fixation and snapping at a small visual object, while a large object was avoided.

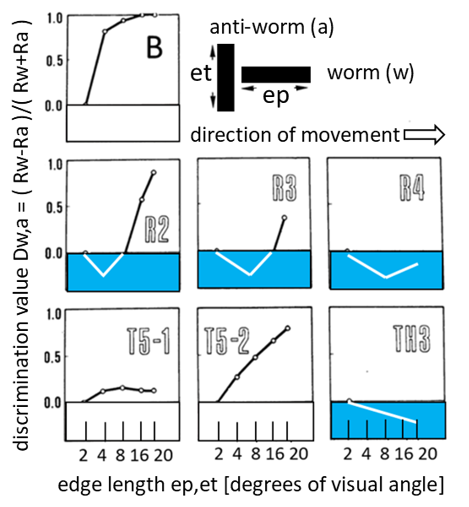
The gestalt contrast between two bars of comparable length ep, et moving in worm (w) or anti-worm (a) configuration is calculated from the discrimination value Dw,a of the response activities Rw,Ra in prey capture (B) or in the discharge frequencies of retinal ganglion cells (R2, R3, R4), tectal neurons (T5.1, T5.2), and pretectal thalamic neurons (TH3). For Dw,a>0, w is preferred over a; for Dw,a<0, a is preferred over w. Prey-selective T5.2 neurons show best correlation with the behavioral data, cf. T5.2 and B. (Adapted from Ewert, Borchers, v.Wietersheim 1978)

Asking either teleologically about the purpose of a behavioral action or asking causal-analytically about the processes that allow the animal to recognize appropriate stimuli before deciding on an action, he opted for the latter, which is of interest to neuroethological multi-method research. With the aid of motor driven perimetric procedures he moved bars of different configurations as dummies and determined what 'small' or 'large' means in terms of invariant stimulus features for the toad's recognition of prey or threat.

It was observed that the worm configuration, which signaled prey, was initiated by movement along the object's long axis, whereas anti-worm configuration, which signaled threat or predator, was due to movement along the short axis. This observation was decisive for the configurative experimental paradigm: when a two-dimensional visual object moves, it is determined by its extension (e) parallel to the direction of movement (ep) and its extension transverse to the direction of movement (et). Toads interpret the extension of ep as prey-like (providing ep lies within behaviorally relevant limits and et is sufficiently small), while they interpret the extension of et as threatening. The distinction between ep- and et-features in relation to the 'worm' vs. 'anti-worm' configuration is independent (invariant) of changes in other stimulus parameters such as color, contrast of the stimulus background, the motion vector in relation to the direction in which the object moves in the toad's field of view on the x, y, or z axis, and, within behaviorally relevant limits, also independent of object size and speed. The use of experimental variations of ep and et enables a quantitative description of sign stimuli according to Tinbergen's concept of gestalt perception from a behavioral science and neurophysiological perspective. This means that the previous classification of toads' prey and predators into size categories of 'small' and 'large' objects, based solely on surface area, is insufficient. For instance, a small black bar measuring 2.5 mm x 10 mm or a large black bar measuring 2.5 mm x 80 mm, moving in a worm configuration against a white background, released intense prey-catching activity. Conversely, the same small or large bars in anti-worm configuration signaled a threat.

They also conducted recording experiments where they inserted electrodes into the brain, while the toad was presented with worm-like or anti-worm-like stimuli or square objects of variable edge length. This technique was repeated at different levels of the visual system and also allowed feature detectors to be identified. It was shown that the stimulus features ep and et are processed in the contralateral retino-topic maps of the retina: ep preferably in the optic tectum by T5.2 neurons and et preferably in the pretectal thalamus by TH3 neurons. In focus was the discovery of prey-selective neurons of the Type T5.2, whose axons could be traced along the tecto-bulbar tract towards the snapping pattern generating cells in the hypoglossal nucleus. The neurophysiological evidence for the tecto-bulbar projection of a T5.2 neuron was verified by antidromic electrical stimulation and three tests: (i) constant latency, (ii) following ability to high frequency stimulation, and (iii) spike collision. In test (iii), a visually elicited orthodromically traveling spike — recorded from the T5.2-cell's axon — triggered an antidromically propagating spike in response to focal electrical stimulation of the tecto-bulbar tract at the level of the hypoglossal nucleus. When both spikes met along the same axon, they annihilated each other.

The discharge patterns of T5.2 prey-selective tectal neurons in response to prey objects – recorded in freely moving toads – 'predicted' prey-catching reactions such as snapping. Another approach, called stimulation experiment, was also carried out in freely moving toads. Focal electrical stimuli were applied to different regions of the brain, and the toad's response was observed. When the pretectal thalamic region was stimulated, the toad exhibited escape responses, but when the optic tectum was stimulated in an area close to prey-selective neurons, the toad engaged in prey catching behavior (Carew 2000). Furthermore, neuroanatomical experiments were carried out where the toad's pretectal thalamic connection to the ipsilateral optic tectum was lesioned and the resulting deficit noted: the prey-selective properties were abolished both in the responses of prey-selective neurons and in the prey catching behavior. These and other experiments suggest that prey selectivity results from thalamic pretectal inhibitory influences to the optic tectum. It is suggested that thalamic TH3 and TH4 neurons, projecting their axons in the bulbar/spinal tract, process both excitatory pretectal thalamic influences from feature et and excitatory tectal influences from feature ep in order to trigger predator avoidance behaviors.

Ewert and his colleagues adopted a variety of methods to study the behaviors of toads to prey and predators, as well as behavior-correlated mapping of brain activity using the [14C]-2Deoxyglucose method. Visual prey dummies trigger intense uptake of [14C]-2DG —radioactivity displaying neuronal energy metabolism activity— particularly in the optic tectum (the site of prey-selective T5.2 neurons); whereas dummies simulating visual threats or predators lead to increased [14C]-2DG-uptake primarily in the pretectal thalamus (the site of predator/threat-selective TH3 neurons). This is consistent with the concept that the retinotopic map in the optic tectum and the retinotopic map in the pretectal thalamus are interacting —parallel information processing— neural networks involved in distinguishing between prey and non-prey (for details see vision in toads). Surgical disruption of the network connections abolished this function.

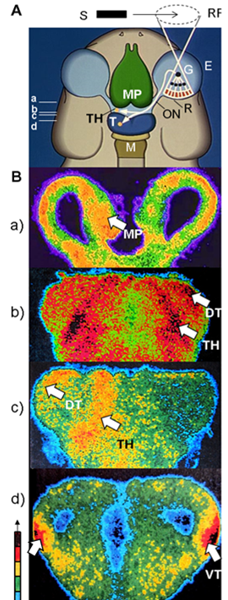
Dorsal view (A) of the toad’s brain and eyes. B) Different visual configurational stimuli (S) release different behavior-correlated [14C]-2DG-uptake (color code: radioactivity increasing from blue to red/black). RF, receptive field of a retinal (R) ganglion cell (G) projecting via optic nerve (ON) to the contralateral brain side: caudal thalamic pretectal region (TH) and optic tectum (T). DT, dorsal tectum; VT, ventral tectum; MP, posterior ventral medial pallium. M, medulla oblongata. The color-coded brain transverse sections at different levels a-d show increases in [14C]-2DG-uptake: (a) unilaterally in MP to a contralaterally moving prey capture releasing large square after conditioning by hand feeding, (b) in TH and DT to a threatening large square, (c) in TH to a threatening antiworm-like bar, and (d) in VT to a snapping releasing worm-like bar. — Figure reprinted from video https://doi.org/10.3203/IWF/C-1805eng with copyright CC_licenses_BY_SA_4.0_deed.de with kind permission by Leibniz-Informationszentrum Technik und Naturwissenschaften,TIB. After Finkenstädt 1985 and Burghagen and Ewert 2022.

From a neuroethological perspective, the toad’s multiple reaction system of prey-catching behavior —turning toward (1), approaching (2), binocular fixating (3), and snapping (4)— provides an example of the concept of sign stimulus and (innate) releasing mechanism according to Nicolaas Tinbergen. It employs different command-triggering systems with access to motor pattern generating neural circuits and operates if the toad’s motivation is appropriate. The release of each system (1–4) requires the recognition of visual features of the prey and differs in its ability to visually localize the prey in space, thereby selecting the adequate strategy for capturing the prey object — ultimately by grabbing it with the tongue or biting it with the jaw (for details see vision in toads). The toad's ability —as shown in the video of an experiment— to switch back and forth flawlessly between the worm and anti-worm responses in a fraction of a second exploits the sensorimotor affinities of the prey-detection neurons T5.2. This is consistent with an ethological approach that considers the notion of fixed action pattern.

Ewert and coworkers showed in toads that there are stimulus-response mediating pathways that translate perception (of visual sign stimuli) into action (adequate behavioral responses). In addition there are modulatory loops that initiate, modify or specify this mediation (Ewert 2004). Regarding the latter, for example, the telencephalic caudal ventral striatum is involved in a loop gating the stimulus-response mediation in a manner of directed attention. The posterior telencephalic ventral medial pallium vMP ('primordium hippocampi'), however, is involved in loops that either modify prey-selection due to associative learning or specify prey-selection due to stimulus-selective habituation, respectively. Both learning-induced changes in prey selection were severed following a vMP lesion, while the original species-specific selectivity prevailed.

== Computational neuroethology ==
Computational neuroethology (CN or CNE) is concerned with the computer modelling of the neural mechanisms underlying animal behaviors. Together with the term "artificial ethology," the term "computational neuroethology" was first published in literature by Achacoso and Yamamoto in the Spring of 1990, based on their pioneering work on the connectome of C. elegans in 1989, with further publications in 1992. Computational neuroethology was argued for in depth later in 1990 by Randall Beer and by Dave Cliff both of whom acknowledged the strong influence of Michael Arbib's Rana Computatrix computational model of neural mechanisms for visual guidance in frogs and toads.

CNE systems work within a closed-loop environment; that is, they perceive their (perhaps artificial) environment directly, rather than through human input, as is typical in AI systems. For example, Barlow et al. developed a time-dependent model for the retina of the horseshoe crab Limulus polyphemus on a Connection Machine (Model CM-2). Instead of feeding the model retina with idealized input signals, they exposed the simulation to digitized video sequences made underwater, and compared its response with those of real animals.

== Model systems ==
- Bat echolocation – nocturnal flight navigation and prey capture; location of objects using echo returns of its own call
- Oscine bird song – zebra finch (Taeniopygia guttata), canary (Serinus canaria) and white-crowned sparrow (Zonotrichia leucophrys); song learning as a model for human speech development
- Electric fish – navigation, communication, Jamming Avoidance Response (JAR), corollary discharge, expectation generators, and spike timing dependent plasticity
- Barn owl auditory spatial map – nocturnal prey location and capture
- Toad vision – discrimination of prey versus predator – "Image processing in the toad's visual system: behavior, brain function, artificial neuronal net." Video
- Circadian rhythm – influence of various circadian controlled behaviors by the suprachiasmatic nucleus
- Cricket song – mate attraction and corollary discharge
- Fish Mauthner cells – C-start escape response and underwater directional hearing
- Fly – Microscale directional hearing in Ormia ochracea, sex differences of the visual system in Bibionidae, and spatial navigation in chasing behavior of Fannia canicularis
- Noctuid moths – ultrasound avoidance response to bat calls
- Aplysia sea hares – learning and memory in startle response
- Rat – spatial memory and navigation
- Salmon homing – olfactory imprinting and thyroid hormones
- Crayfish – escape and startle behaviors, aggression and formation of social hierarchies
- Cichlid fish – aggression and attack behaviors
- Honey bee – learning, navigation, vision, olfaction, flight, aggression, foraging
- Monarch butterfly – navigational mechanisms
- More Model Systems and Information

== See also ==
- Niko Tinbergen
- Karl von Frisch
- Konrad Lorenz
- Erich von Holst
- Theodore H. Bullock
- Jörg-Peter Ewert
- Eric Knudsen
- Masakazu Konishi
- Martin Giurfa

== Sources ==
- Beer D., Randall, Roy E. Ritzmann, Thomas McKenna (1993) Biological neural networks in invertebrate neuroethology and robotics. Boston : Academic Press.
- Camhi, J.M. (1984) Neuroethology: Nerve cells and the Natural behavior of Animals, Sinauer Associates.
- Carew, T.J. (2000) Feature analysis in Toads. Behavioral Neurobiology, Sunderland, MA: Sinauer, pp. 95–119.
- Carew, T.J. (2000) Behavioral neurobiology: The Cellular Organization of Natural Behavior, Sinauer Associates.
- Ewert, J.-P. (1974) The neural basis of visually guided behavior. Scientific American 230(3):34-42
- Ewert J.-P. (2004) Motion perception shapes the visual world of amphibians. In: Prete F.R. (Ed.) Complex Worlds from Simpler Nervous Systems. Cambridge, MA, MIT Press, pp. 117–160
- Hoyle, G. (1984) The scope of Neuroethology. Behavioural Brain Science 7:367-412. Graham Hoyle put forth a rather narrow definition of the goals and subject matter of neuroethology and links the field to the field of ethology. This is followed by commentaries from many prominent neuroethologists. It makes for fascinating reading.
- Metzner, W. (1993) The Jamming avoidance response in Eigenmannia is controlled by two separate motor pathways. The Journal of Neuroscience. 13(5):1862-1878
- Pfluger, H.-J. and R. Menzel (1999) Neuroethology, its roots and future. J Comp Physiol A 185:389-392.
- Zupanc, G.K.H. (2004) Behavioral Neurobiology: An Integrative Approach. Oxford University Press: Oxford, UK.
