= Efference copy =

Concept in physiology

In physiology, an efference copy or efferent copy is an internal copy of an outflowing (efferent), movement-producing signal generated by an organism's motor system. It can be collated with the (reafferent) sensory input that results from the agent's movement, enabling a comparison of actual movement with desired movement, and a shielding of perception from particular self-induced effects on the sensory input to achieve perceptual stability. Together with internal models, efference copies can serve to enable the brain to predict the effects of an action.

An equivalent term with a different history is corollary discharge.

Efference copies are important in enabling motor adaptation such as to enhance gaze stability. They have a role in the perception of self and nonself electric fields in electric fish. They also underlie the phenomenon of tickling.

== Motor control ==
=== Motor signals ===
A motor signal from the central nervous system (CNS) to the periphery is called an efference, and a copy of this signal is called an efference copy. Sensory information coming from sensory receptors in the peripheral nervous system to the central nervous system is called afference. On a similar basis, nerves into the nervous system are afferent nerves and ones out are termed efferent nerves.

When an efferent signal is produced and sent to the motor system, it has been suggested that a copy of the signal, known as an efference copy, is created so that exafference (sensory signals generated from external stimuli in the environment) can be distinguished from reafference (sensory signals resulting from an animal's own actions).

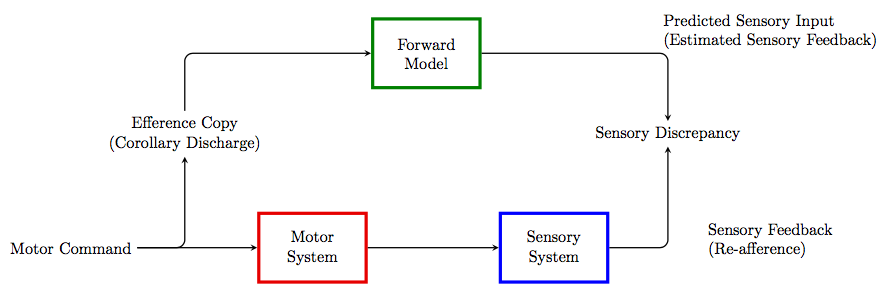
An efference copy is used to generate the predicted sensory input which estimates the (somato)sensory consequences of a motor command (top row). The sensory consequences of the executed motor command (bottom row) are used to compare with the corollary discharge to inform the CNS about external actions.

This efference copy, by providing the input to a forward internal model, is then used to generate the predicted sensory feedback that estimates the sensory consequences of a motor command. The actual sensory consequences of the motor command are then deployed to compare with the corollary discharge to inform the CNS about how well the expected action matched its actual external action.

=== Corollary discharge ===
Corollary discharge is characterized as an efference copy of an action command used to inhibit any response to the self generated sensory signal which would interfere with the execution of the motor task. The inhibitory commands originate at the same time as the motor command and target the sensory pathway that would report any reafference to higher levels of the CNS. This is unique from the efference copy, since the corollary discharge is actually fed into the sensory pathway to cancel out the reafferent signals generated by the movement. Alternatively, corollary discharges briefly alters self-generated sensory responses to reduce self-induced desensitization or help distinguish between self-generated and externally generated sensory information.

== History ==
=== Steinbuch ===
In 1811 Johann Georg Steinbuch (1770–1818) referred repeatedly to the problem of efference copy and reafference in his book "Beytrag zur Physiologie der Sinne" ("Contribution to the Physiology of Senses"). After studying medicine, Steinbuch worked for a number of years as lecturer at the University of Erlangen and thereafter as physician in Heidenheim, Ulm, and Herrenberg (Württemberg, South Germany). As a young university teacher, he was particularly interested in the brain mechanisms which enable the perception of space and objects, but in later years his attention shifted to the more practical problems of clinical medicine. Together with Justinus Kerner he gave a very precise description in 1817 of the clinical symptoms of botulism. In his book "Beytrag zur Physiologie der Sinne", Steinbuch presented a very careful analysis of the tactile recognition of objects by the grasping hand. Hereby, he developed the hypothesis that the cerebral mechanisms controlling the movement of the hands interact within the brain with the afferent signal flow evoked in the mechanoreceptors while the grasping hand is moving across the surface of the object. The cerebral signals controlling the movement were called "Bewegidee" (motion idea). According to Steinbuch's model, only by the interaction of the "Bewegidee" with the afferent signal flow did object recognition become possible. He illustrated his statements by a simple experiment: if an object passively activates the mechanoreceptors of the palm and fingers of a resting hand for sufficient sequences and time, object recognition is not achieved. When the hand, however, grasps actively, object recognition occurs within a few seconds.

=== von Helmholtz ===
The first person to propose the existence of efferent copies was the German physician and physicist Hermann von Helmholtz in the middle of the 19th century. He argued that the brain needed to create an efference copy for the motor commands that controlled eye muscles so as to aid the brain's determining the location of an object relative to the head. His argument used the experiment in which one gently presses on one's own eye. If this is done, one notices that the visual world seems to have "moved" as a result of this passive movement of the eyeball. In contrast, if the eyeball is actively moved by the eye muscles the world is perceived as still. The reasoning made is that with a passive movement of the eyeball, no efferent copies are made as with active movements that allow sensory changes to be anticipated and controlled for with the result in their absence the world appears to move.

=== Sherrington ===
In 1900, Charles Sherrington, the founder of modern ideas about motor control, rejected von Helmholtz ideas and argued that efference copies were not needed as muscles had their own sense of the movements they made. "The view [of von Helmholtz and his followers] which dispenses with peripheral organs and afferent nerves for the muscular sense has had powerful adherents . . . It supposes that during ... a willed movement the outgoing current of impulses from brain to muscle is accompanied by a 'sensation for innervation'. ... it "remains unproven". This resulted in the idea of efference copies being dropped for the next 75 years.

=== Von Holst ===
In 1950, Erich von Holst and Horst Mittelstaedt investigated how species are able to distinguish between exafference and reafference given a seemingly identical percept of the two. To explore this question, they rotated the head of a fly 180 degrees, effectively reversing the right and left edges of the retina and reversing the subject's subsequent reafferent signals. In this state, self-initiated movements of the fly would result in a perception that the world was also moving, rather than standing still as they would in a normal fly. After rotation of the eyes, the animal showed a reinforcement of the optokinetic response in the same direction as the moving visual input. Von Holst and Mittelstaedt interpreted their findings as evidence that corollary discharge (i.e. neural inhibition with active movement) could not have accounted for this observed change as this would have been expected to inhibit the optokinetic reaction. They concluded that an "Efferenzkopie" of the motor command was responsible for this reaction due to the persistence of the reafferent signal and given the consequent discrepancy between expected and actual sensory signals which reinforced the response rather than preventing it.

=== Sperry ===
The Nobel Prize winner, Roger Wolcott Sperry argued for the basis of corollary discharges following his research upon the optokinetic reflex. He is also regarded as the originator of the term "corollary discharge".

== Motor adaptation ==
=== The Coriolis effect ===
Efference copy relates to Coriolis effect in a manner that allows for learning and correction of errors experienced from self-generated Coriolis forces. During trunk rotational movements there is a learned CNS anticipation of Coriolis effects, mediated by generation of an appropriate efference copy that can be compared to re-afferent information.

=== Gaze stability ===
It has been proposed that efference copy has an important role in maintaining gaze stability with active head movement by augmenting the vestibulo-ocular reflex (aVOR) during dynamic visual acuity testing.

=== Grip force ===
Efference copy within an internal model allows us to grip objects in parallel to a given load. In other words, the subject is able to properly grip any load that they are provided because the internal model provides such a good prediction of the object without any delay. Flanagan and Wing tested to see whether an internal model is used to predict movement-dependent loads by observing grip force changes with known loads during arm movements. They found that even when giving subjects different known loads the grip force was able to predict the load force. Even when the load force was suddenly changed the grip force never lagged in the phase relationship with the load force, therefore affirming the fact that there was an internal model in the CNS that was allowing for the proper prediction to occur. It has been suggested by Kawato that for gripping, the CNS uses a combination of the inverse and forward model. With the use of the efference copy the internal model can predict a future hand trajectory, thus allowing for the parallel grip to the particular load of the known object.

== Tickling ==
Experiments have been conducted wherein subjects' feet are tickled both by themselves and with a robotic arm controlled by their own arm movements. These experiments have shown that people find a self-produced tickling motion of the foot to be much less "tickly" than a tickling motion produced by an outside source. They have postulated that this is because when a person sends a motor command to produce the tickling motion, the efference copy anticipates and cancels out the sensory outcome. This idea is further supported by evidence that a delay between the self-produced tickling motor command and the actual execution of this movement (mediated by a robotic arm) causes an increase in the perceived tickliness of the sensation. This shows that when the efference copy is incompatible with the afference, the sensory information is perceived as if it were exafference. Therefore, it is theorized that it is not possible to tickle ourselves because when the predicted sensory feedback (efference copy) matches the actual sensory feedback, the actual feedback will be attenuated. If the predicted sensory feedback does not match the actual sensory feedback, whether caused by a delay (as in the mediation by the robotic arm) or by external influences from the environment, the brain cannot predict the tickling motion on the body and a more intense tickling sensation is perceived. This is the reason why one cannot tickle oneself.

== Speech ==
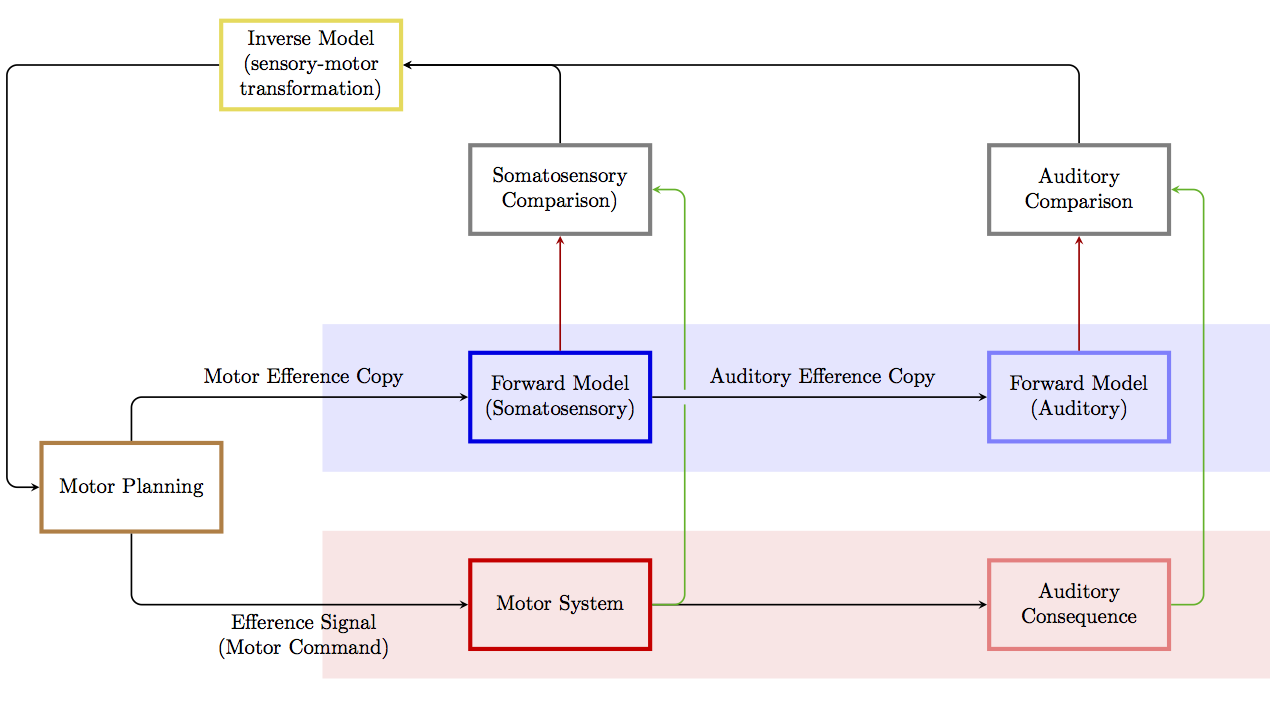
Efference copies as used in speech production: motor and auditory efference copies serve to allow for rapid comparison with motor and auditory consequences.

It has been argued that motor efference copies play an important role in speech production. Tian and Poeppel propose that a motor efference copy is used to produce a forward model of somatosensory estimation, which entails an estimation of the articulatory movement and position of the articulators as a result of planned motor action. A second (subsequent) auditory efference copy entails the estimation of auditory information as produced by the articulatory system in a second forward model. Both of these forward models can produce respective predictions and corollary discharge, which can in turn be used in comparisons with somatosensory and auditory feedback.

Efference copies also occur not only with spoken words, but with inner language - the quiet production of words. This system is thought by some to be the basis for inner speech. In the case of inner speech, the efference signal is not sent or is inhibited before action takes place, leaving only the efference copy and leading to the perception of inner speech or inner hearing.

Related to its role in inner speech, it has been suggested to underlie auditory verbal hallucinations. In this case, it is thought that a breakdown along the efference copy and forward model route creates a mismatch between what is expected and what is observed, leading to the experience that speech is not produced by oneself.

Efference copies have been found by intracerebral EEG in a professional musician when playing his violin.

Recent studies suggest that efference copy already occurs when an acoustic signal is generated at the press of a button. The differences in the ERP signal of the efference copy are so severe that machine learning algorithms can distinguish between schizophrenia patients and healthy control subjects, for example.

== Mormyrid electric fish ==
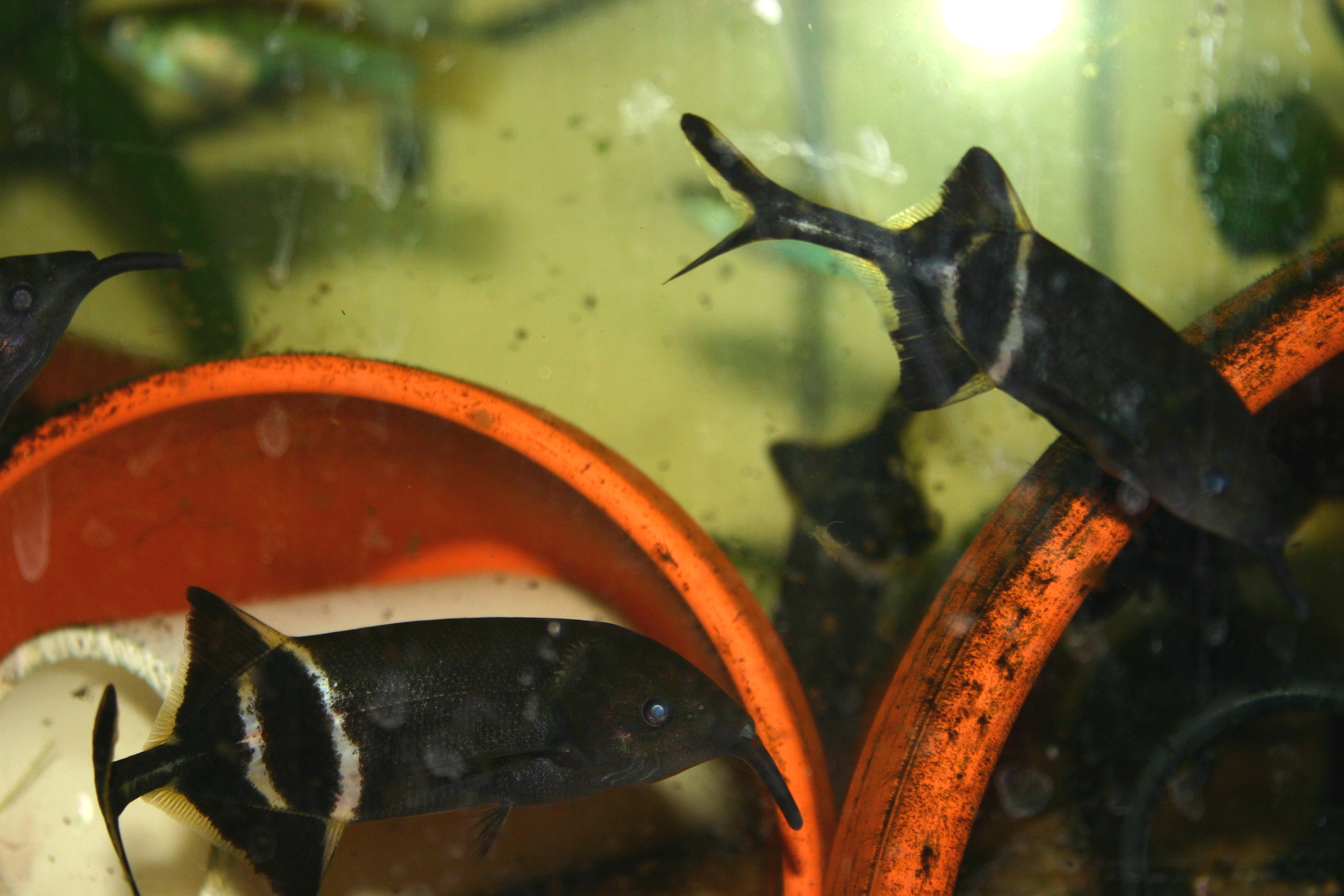
In the mormyrid electric fish corollary discharges enables the knollenorgan sensor (KS) to detect the electric organ discharges of other fish without also detecting their own self generated electric organ discharges.

The mormyrid electric fish provides an example of corollary discharge in lower vertebrates. Specifically, the knollenorgan sensor (KS) is involved with electro-communication, detecting the electric organ discharges (EOD) of other fish. Unless the reafference was somehow modulated, the KS would also detect self generated EODs that would interfere with interpretation of external EODs needed for communication between fish. However, these fish display corollary discharges that inhibit the ascending sensory pathway at the first CNS relay point. These corollary discharges are timed to arrive at the same time as the reafference from the KS to minimize the interference of self-produced EODs with the perception of external EODs, and optimize the duration of inhibition.

== See also ==
- Internal model (motor control)
- Corollary discharge theory
