= List of fellows of the Royal Society elected in 2015 =

This article lists fellows of the Royal Society who were elected in 2015.

== Fellows of the Royal Society (FRS) ==
1. Mark Achtman
2. Ali Alavi
3. Allan Balmain
4. Kamal Bawa
5. Stephen D. M. Brown FMedSci
6. Jane Clarke FMedSci
7. Clifford Cocks CB
8. Sir Rory Collins FMedSci
9. Andrew Ian Cooper
10. Stephen A. Cusack
11. Anne Cutler
12. Benjamin Guy Davis
13. Annette Dolphin FMedSci
14. Philip Donoghue
15. Daniel J. Drucker
16. Sir James Dyson CBE FREng
17. Anthony William Fairbank Edwards
18. Yvonne Elsworth
19. Alison Etheridge
20. Jeremy Farrar OBE FMedSci
21. Zoubin Ghahramani
22. Michael E. Goddard
23. Michael Hausser FMedSci
24. Laurence Hurst
25. Jane A. Langdale
26. Andrew P. Mackenzie
27. Philip Maini
28. Jens Marklof
29. Gero Miesenböck FMedSci
30. Ketan J. Patel FMedSci
31. David Phillips CBE
32. Jonathan Pila
33. Roger Powell
34. John Rarity
35. Andrew Fraser Read
36. Alan Madoc Roberts
37. John Robertson
38. Roger Sheldon
39. Dame Julia Slingo DBE
40. Scott William Sloan
41. Henry Snaith
42. Ajay K. Sood
43. Natalie Strynadka
44. Richard Thomas
45. Bryan M. Turner FMedSci
46. Frank Uhlmann
47. Colin Wilson
48. Lisa Jardine Honorary Fellow
49. Sir Robin Saxby Honorary Fellow
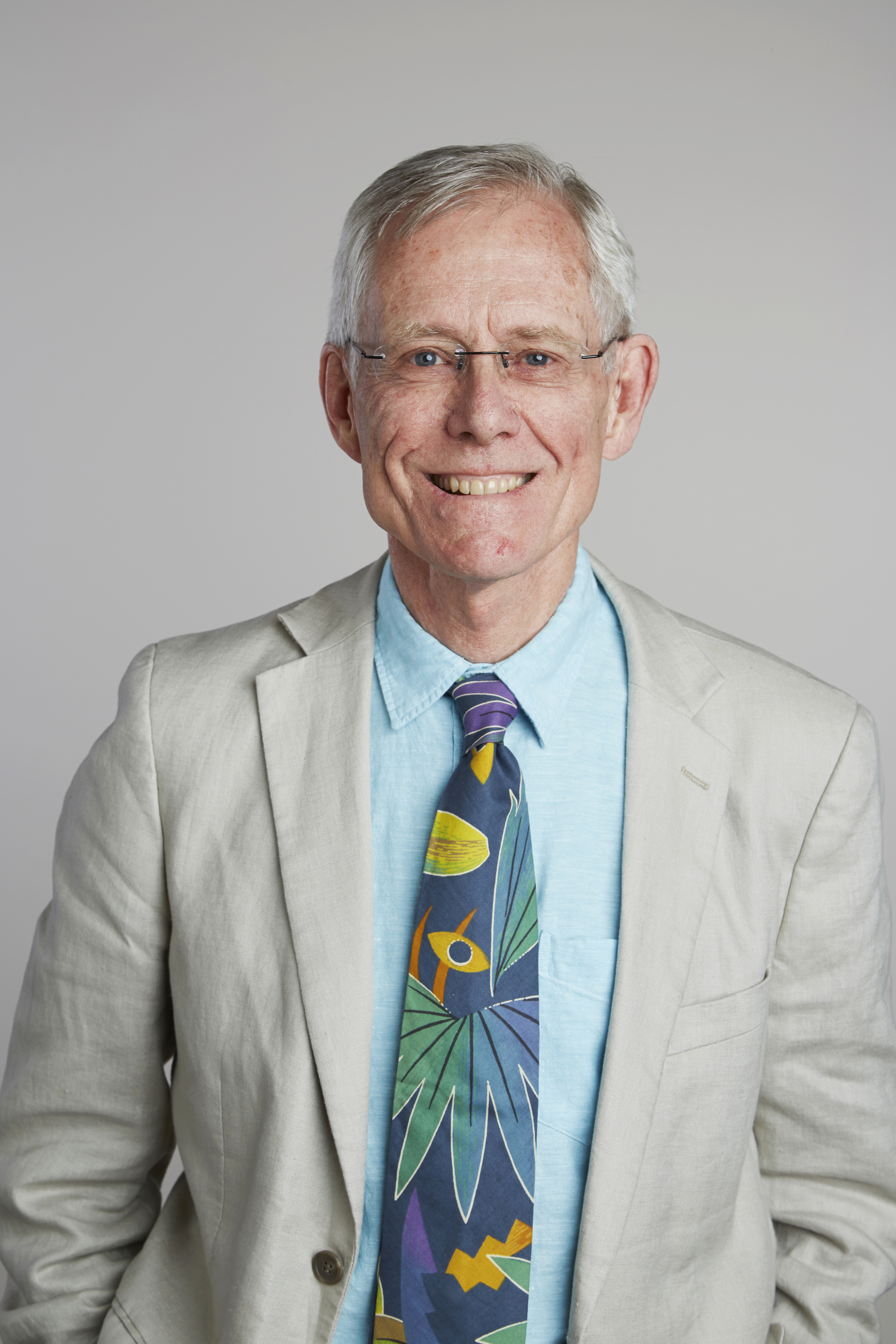
Professor Alan Madoc Roberts FRS, electrophysiologist, neuroanatomist and student of animal behaviour

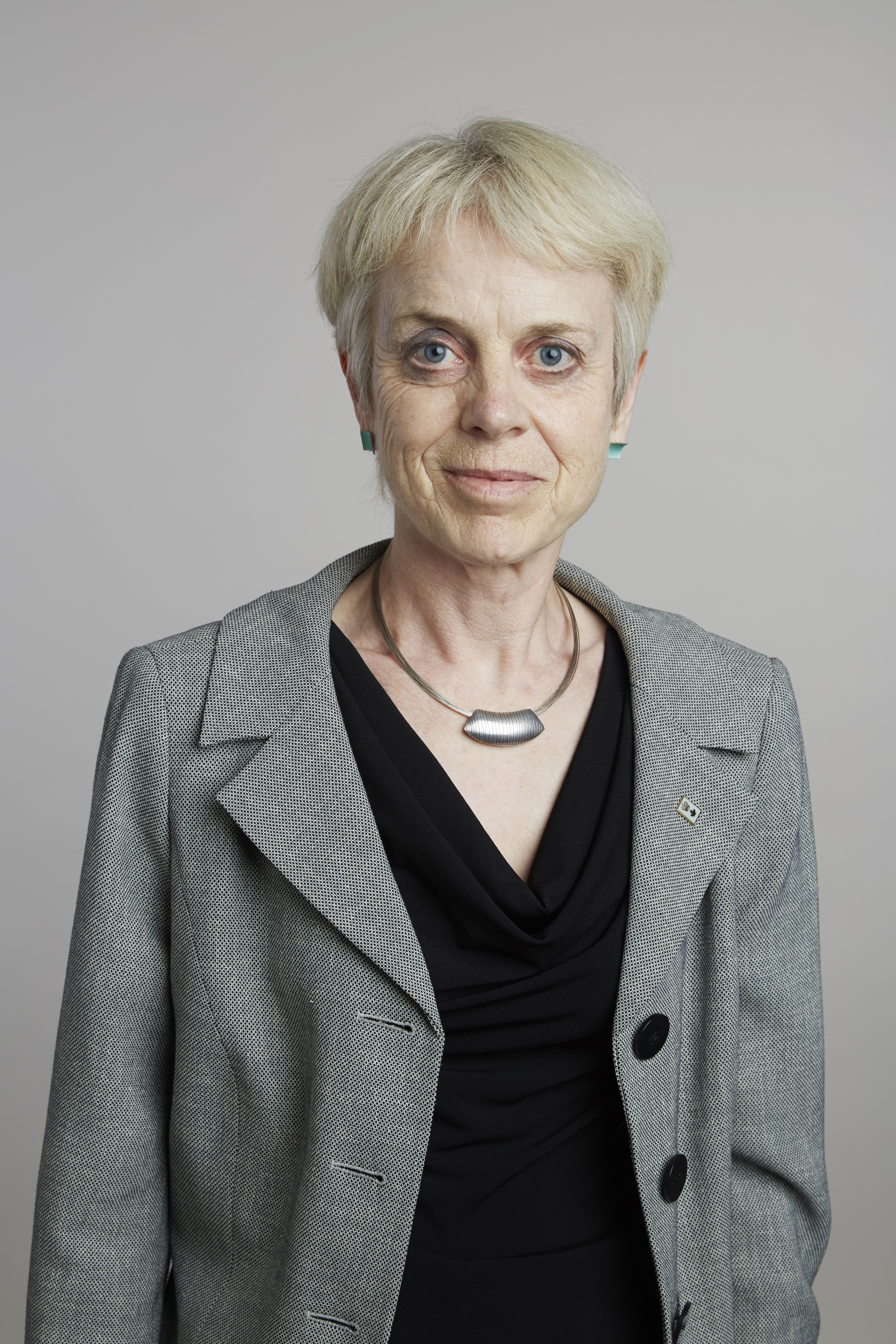
Professor Annette Dolphin FRS, Professor of Pharmacology at UCL

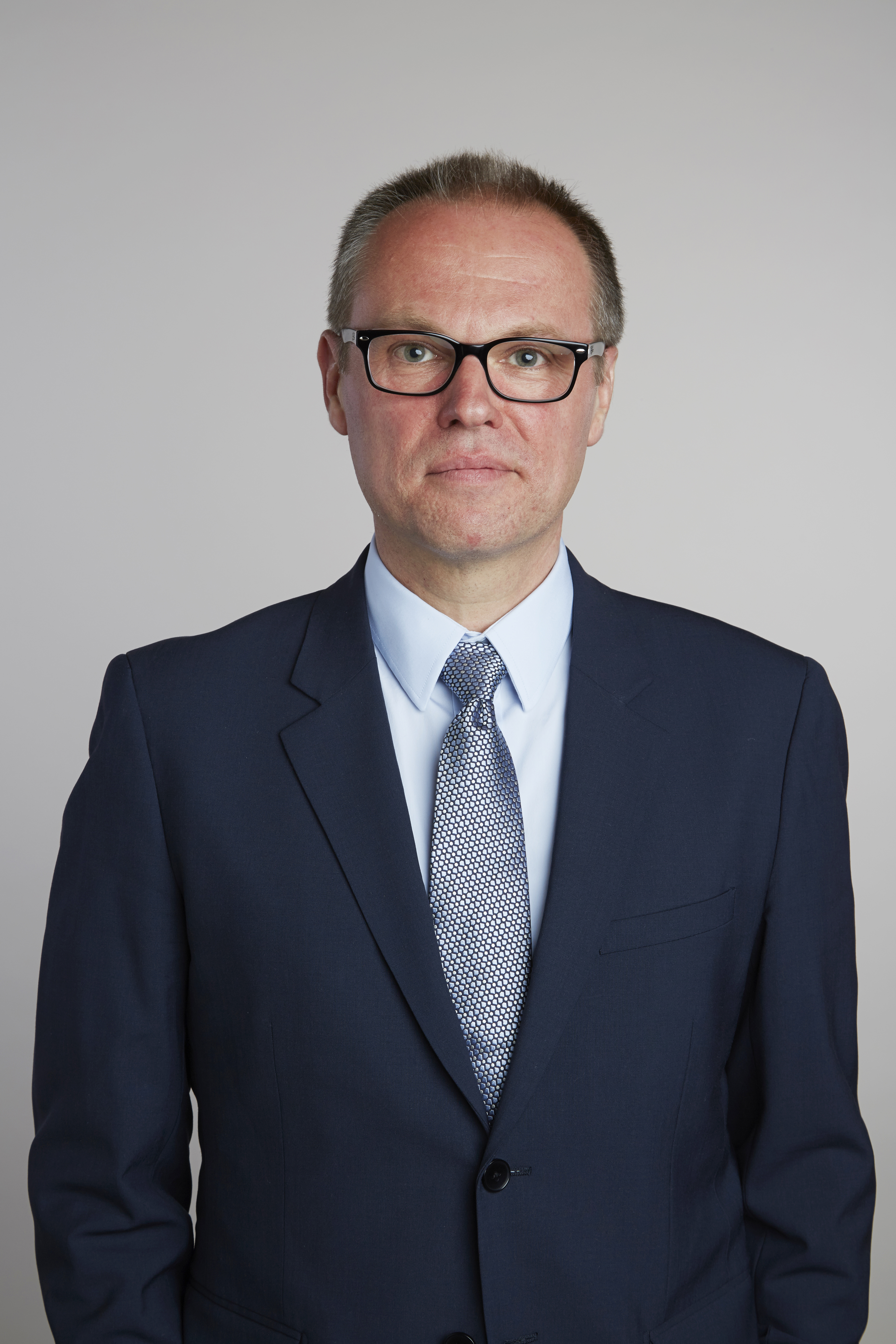
Gero Miesenböck FRS, Waynflete Professor of Physiology at Oxford

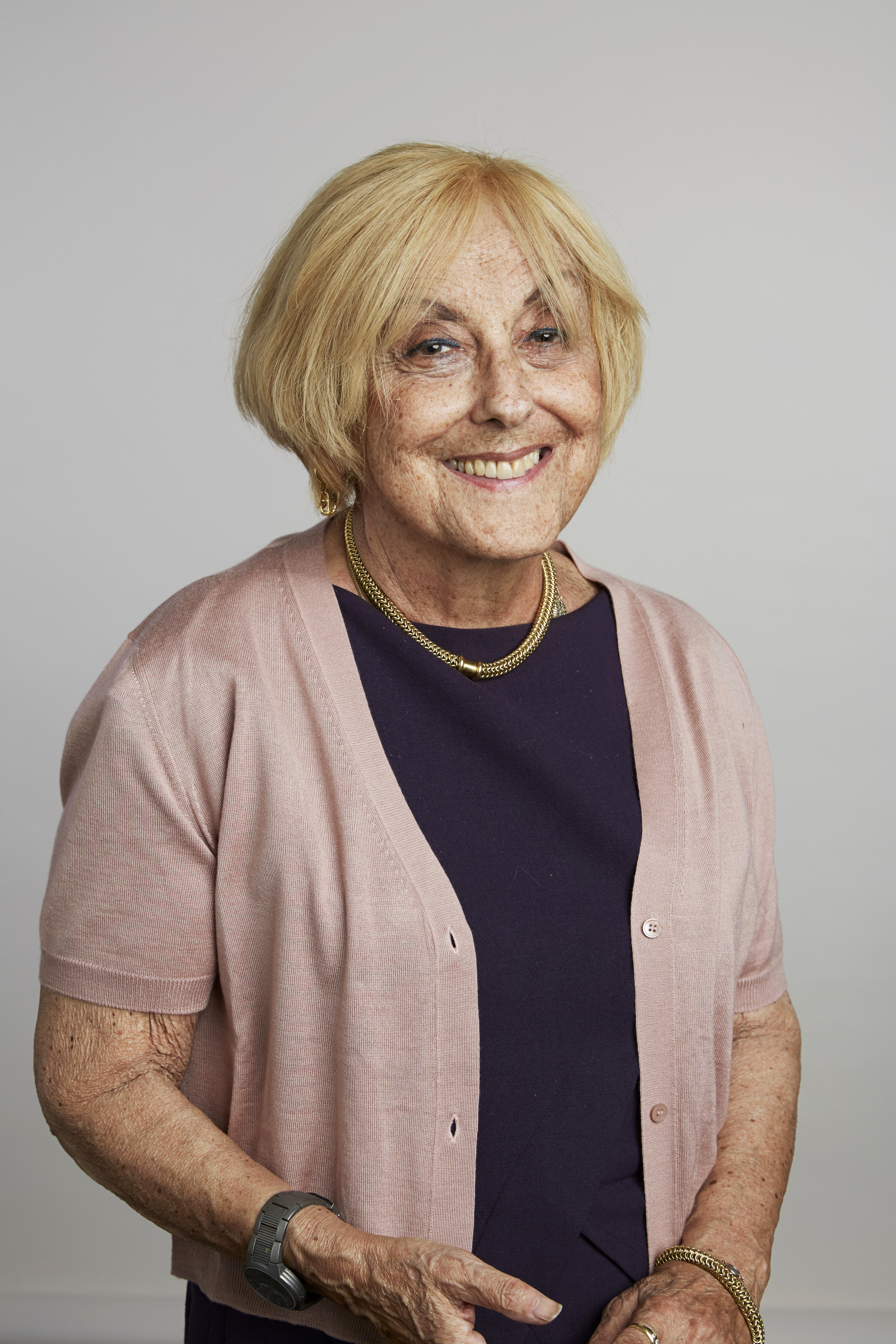
Lisa Jardine CBE, FRS, Professor of Renaissance Studies at UCL

== Foreign Members of the Royal Society (ForMemRS) ==
1. Alain Aspect
2. Zdeněk Bažant
3. Linda B. Buck
4. Andrew H. Knoll
5. John Kuriyan
6. Jiayang Li
7. Susan Lindquist
8. Gail R. Martin
9. William Hughes Miller
10. John C. H. Spence
