= Horst Mittelstaedt =

German cybernetician and zoologist (1923–2016)

- Born: 28 April 1923; Neumünster, Germany
- Died: 18 February 2016 (aged 92); Munich, Germany
- Known for: described the Reafference Principle together with Erich von Holst
- Scientific career
- Fields: Biology, Cybernetics
- Workplaces: Max Planck Institute for Behavioral Physiology

Horst Mittelstaedt (28 April 1923 – 18 February 2016) was a German biologist and cybernetician. Together with Erich von Holst he demonstrated the "Reafference Principle" in 1950 (Das Reafferenzprinzip) concerning how an organism is able to separate reafferent (self-generated) sensory stimuli from exafferent (externally generated) sensory stimuli. This concept largely dealt with interactive processes between the central nervous system and its periphery.

Until 1999 he worked at the Max Planck Institute for Behavioral Physiology at Seewiesen, Bavaria. His scientific focus was cybernetic analysis of behaviour.

Mittelstaedt died in Munich on 18 February 2016, at the age of 92.

== Selected publications ==
- Physiologie des Gleichgewichtssinnes bei fliegenden Libellen, in: Zeitschrift für vergleichende Physiologie. Band 32, Stürtz, Würzburg 1950, S. 422-463,, OCLC 720205713 (Dissertation Universität Heidelberg, Naturwissenschaftlich-mathematische Fakultät, 27. Juli 1949, 84 pages,.
- with E. v. Holst: Das Reafferenzprinzip. In: Naturwissenschaften. Band 37, Nr. 20, 1950, S. 464–476, doi:10.1007/BF00622503
- Einführung in die Kybernetik des Verhaltens am Beispiel der Orientierung im Raum. In: W. Hoppe, W. Lohmann, H. Markl, H. Ziegler (eds.): Biophysik. 2nd edition. Springer, Berlin, Heidelberg, New York 1982, ISBN 3-540-11335-5.
- The Information Processing Structure of the Subjective Vertical. A Cybernetic Bridge between its Psychophysics and its Neurobiology. In: H. Marko, G. Hauske, A. Struppler (eds.): Processing Structures for Perception and Action: Final Report of the Sonderforschungsbereich „Kybernetik“ 1969–1983. VCH, Weinheim, New York, Cambridge, Basel 1988, ISBN 3-527-27705-6, pp. 217–263.
