= Corollary discharge theory =

Theory of motion perception

The corollary discharge theory (CD) of motion perception helps understand how the brain can detect motion through the visual system, even though the body is not moving. When a signal is sent from the motor cortex of the brain to the eye muscles, a copy of that signal (see efference copy) is sent through the brain as well. The brain does this in order to distinguish real movements in the visual world from our own body and eye movement. The original signal and copy signal are then believed to be compared somewhere in the brain. Such a structure has not yet been identified, but it is believed to be the Medial Superior Temporal Area (MST). The original signal and copy need to be compared in order to determine if the change in vision was caused by eye movement or movement in the world. If the two signals cancel then no motion is perceived, but if they do not cancel then the residual signal is perceived as motion in the real world. Without a corollary discharge signal, the world would seem to spin around every time the eyes moved. Corollary discharge and efference copy are sometimes used synonymously; they were originally coined for different applications, with corollary discharge being used in a much broader sense.

== Discovery ==
The first scientific research study looking at corollary discharge was done by Descartes in 1664 when he published his book the Treatise of Man. He was studying apparent motion and developed early theories in an error of the mind to account for efferent signals centuries before corollary discharge theories developed. In his experiment he would take his finger and press it on the side of his eye. In doing this he would move the image across his retina. A signal was then sent to the brain saying that the image had moved and because there was no efference copy signal sent as well, his brain perceived motion. The term corollary discharge was finally coined in 1950 by Roger Sperry while doing studies on fish.

== Physiology ==
When trying to map out how corollary discharge works in the brain, it is important to begin with the superior colliculus. It is responsible for receiving visual signals from the retina. In studies done on primate brains, a corollary discharge pathway has been found to begin in the superior colliculus. After receiving current information about the visual field, a corollary discharge signal is sent from the superior colliculus to the frontal eye field, via the medial dorsal nucleus of the thalamus. The frontal eye field plays a very important role when it comes to eye movements. Particularly the frontal eye field is responsible for much of the saccadic eye movements that eyes make. Once the frontal eye field is activated by the corollary discharge signal, it sends a predictive signal to the occipital lobe. This signal essentially predicts what the visual field should look like after an eye movement. A signal is sent back from the occipital lobe to the frontal eye field describing actual visual input. In summary, the corollary discharge pathway is responsible for helping guide eye movements as well as keeping stable visual perception. Recent studies suggest that deficiencies within this pathway could be responsible for difficulties that schizophrenic patients have with controlling their own movements.
