= John Robertson (physicist) =

British scientist

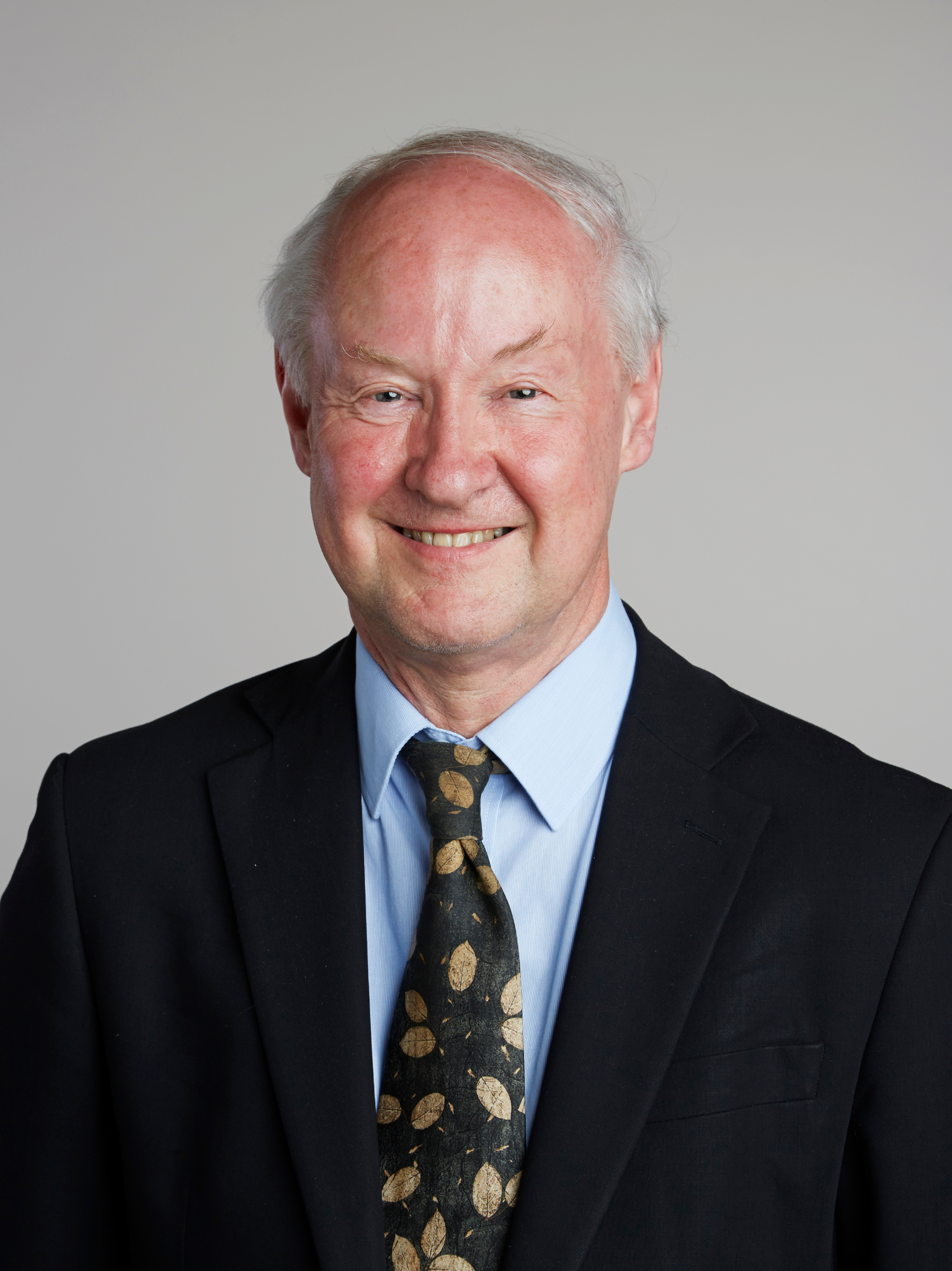
- John Robertson in 2015
- Born: 1950 (age 75–76); Manchester
- Education: University of Cambridge (BA, PhD)
- Awards: FRS (2015)
- Scientific career
- Fields: Electronics; Carbon nanotubes; Amorphous carbon
- Workplaces: University of Cambridge; Central Electricity Research Laboratories; University of Illinois at Urbana–Champaign
- Thesis: Electronic States in Amorphous Semi-Conductors (1975)
- Website: eng.cam.ac.uk/profiles/jr214

John Robertson FRS (born 1950) is a professor of electronics, in the Department of Engineering at the University of Cambridge. He is a leading specialist in the theory of amorphous carbon and related materials.

== Education ==
Robertson received his Bachelor of Arts and Doctor of Philosophy degrees from the University of Cambridge. His PhD was awarded in 1975 for research on electronic states in amorphous semiconductors.

== Research and career ==
Following his PhD, Robertson worked at the Central Electricity Research Laboratories for 18 years, and in 1994 returned to Cambridge. He has published over 600 journal papers with around 33,000 citations. His main topic of research is theory of carbon materials. Other research interests include: carbon nanotubes, graphene, chemical vapour deposition, electronic applications (experimental and calculation); modelling of CVD mechanisms; carbon interconnects, carbon conductors, carbon for supercapacitors; high-κ dielectrics for complementary metal oxide semiconductor transistors; high-κ oxides on high mobility substrates such as InGaAs, Ge (modelling); transparent conducting oxides, amorphous oxide semiconductors (AOS) such as indium gallium zinc oxide, their thin film transistors, instability mechanisms (calculations); density functional calculations of semiconductors, oxides, carbon materials, and hybrid density functional calculations for correct band gaps; functional oxides, TiO_{2}.

His research has been funded by the Engineering and Physical Sciences Research Council (EPSRC).

== Awards and honours ==
Robertson is a Fellow of the American Physical Society, the Institute of Electrical and Electronics Engineers (IEEE) and the Materials Research Society, and an emeritus editor of the journal Diamond and Related Materials. He was elected a Fellow of the Royal Society (FRS) in 2015, his certificate of election reads: "In recognition of his sustained contribution to the production and development of electronic devices". He was elected a Fellow of the Royal Academy of Engineering in 2020.
