= Mark Achtman =

Canadian bacteriologist

Mark Achtman FRS
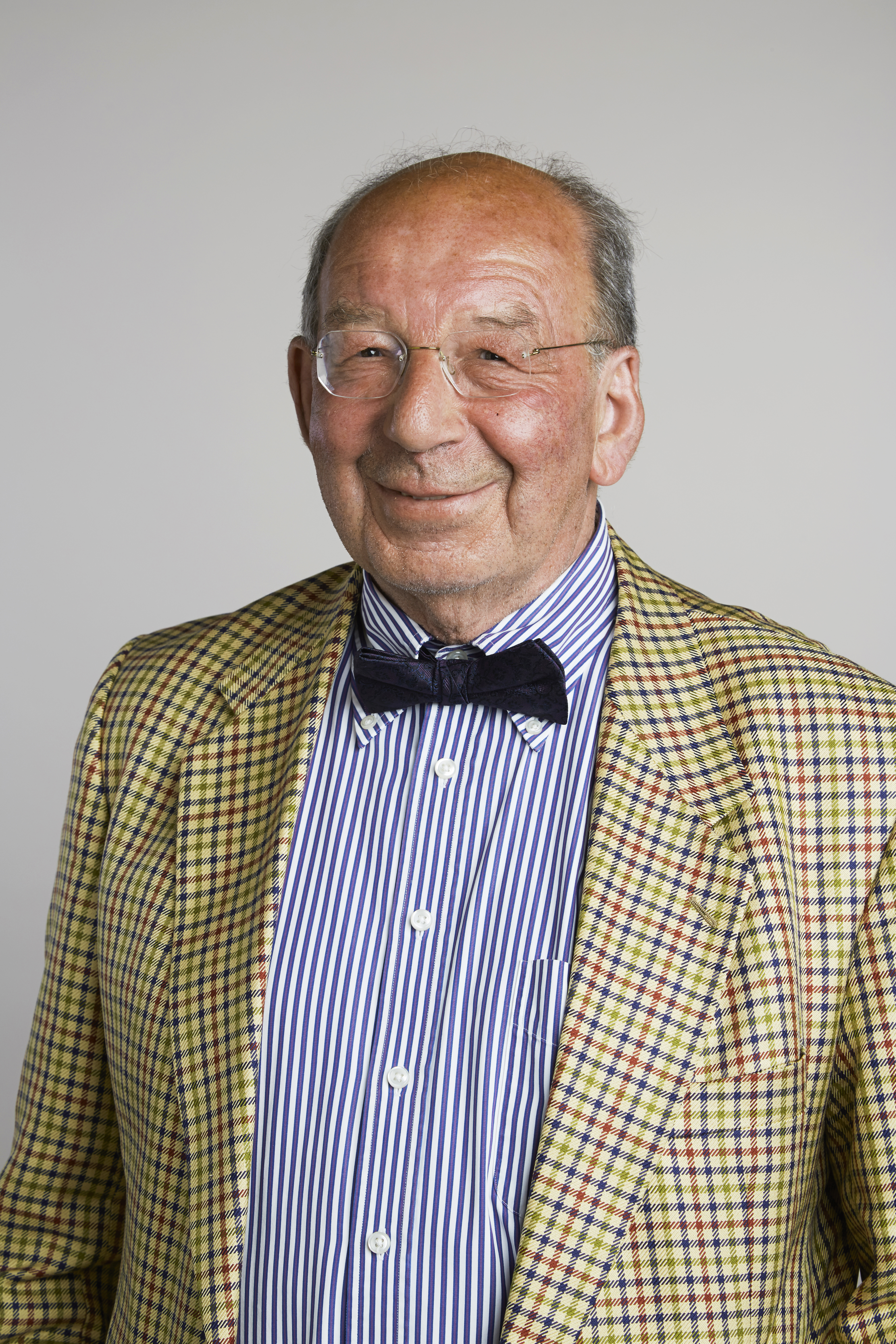
- Mark Achtman in 2015, portrait via the Royal Society
- Education: McGill University (BSc); University of Manitoba (MSc); University of California, Berkeley (PhD)
- Children: Ariel Achtman, Jane Achtman
- Awards: FRS (2015)
- Scientific career
- Fields: Microbial population genetics
- Institutions: University of Warwick; Warwick Medical School; University College Cork; Max Planck Institute for Infection Biology
- Thesis: A Genetic Study of the F-Factor (1969)
- Doctoral advisor: Alvin J. Clark
- Other academic advisors: Thomas Trautner
- Website: www2.warwick.ac.uk/fac/med/staff/machtman

Mark Achtman FRS is an emeritus Professor of Bacterial Population Genetics at Warwick Medical School, part of the University of Warwick in the UK.

== Education ==
Achtman was educated at McGill University and graduated in 1963 (B. Sc. Hon. Bacteriology & Immunology). He then attended the University of Manitoba where he was awarded a Master of Science degree in 1965 for research on hemagglutination in adenovirus. He went on to complete a PhD on bacterial fertility factor at the University of California, Berkeley in 1969.

== Research ==
Achtman's research interests are in the population genetics of pathogenic bacteria such as Vibrio cholerae, Salmonella, Yersinia pestis, Neisseria meningitidis, Escherichia coli, Helicobacter pylori, and Bordetella. Achtman was one of the inventors of multilocus sequence typing. His research has been funded by the Biotechnology and Biological Sciences Research Council (BBSRC) and Medical Research Council (MRC).

== Awards and honours ==
Achtman was elected a Fellow of the Royal Society (FRS) in 2015. His nomination reads:

Mark Achtman co-pioneered the development of bacterial population genetics and carried out influential studies characterising strains associated with epidemics of meningococcal disease in Africa. He has undertaken remarkable and highly innovative studies on the human gut pathogen, Helicobacter pylori, showing its ancient association with humans and the ability of genetic studies of this pathogen to complement linguistic and human genetic studies to trace the ancient migrations of its human host. He has also carried out elegant and incisive genetic studies of Yersinia pestis to explore the origins and spread of plague pandemics.
