= Alan M. Roberts =

English academic (born 1941)

Professor Alan M. Roberts FRS
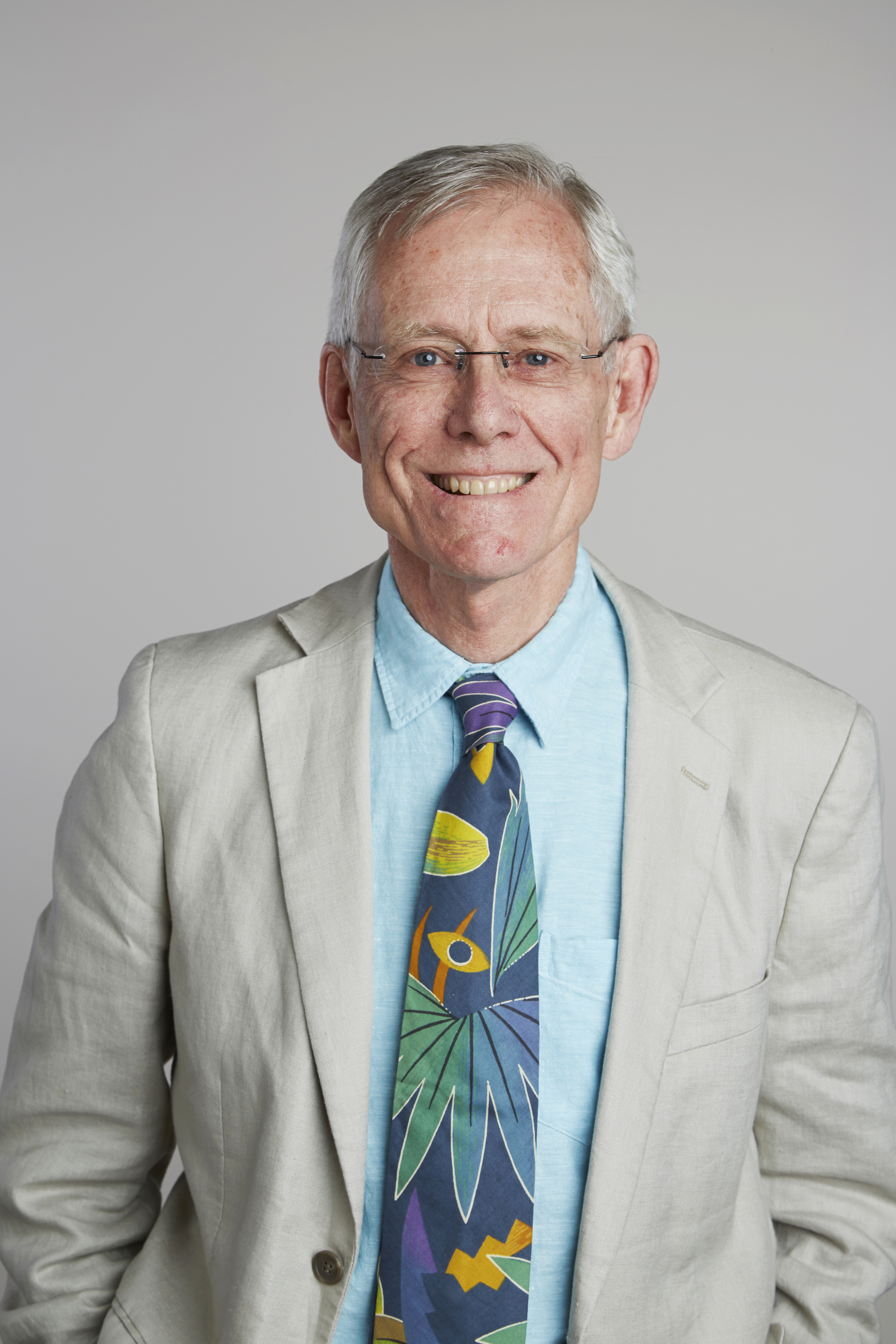
- Roberts in 2015
- Born: Alan Madoc Roberts; 24 August 1941 (age 85); Rugby, Warwickshire
- Education: University of Cambridge; University of California, Los Angeles
- Awards: FRS (2015)
- Scientific career
- Fields: Zoology; Xenopus; Neuroanatomy; Electrophysiology
- Workplaces: University of Bristol; Scripps Institution of Oceanography; University of California, San Diego
- Thesis: Recurrent Inhibition in the Giant Fibre System of the Crayfish and its Effect on the Excitability of the Escape Response (1967)
- Doctoral advisor: Ted Bullock
- Website: bristol.ac.uk/biology/people/alan-roberts

Alan Madoc Roberts (born 1941) is an English academic serving as Emeritus professor of Zoology in the School of Biological Sciences at the University of Bristol.

== Education ==
Roberts was educated at Rugby School and the University of Cambridge, where he studied Natural Sciences (Zoology) at Trinity College, Cambridge. He went on to study at the University of California, Los Angeles (UCLA) where he was awarded a PhD in 1967 for research supervised by Theodore Holmes Bullock on the escape response of Crayfish.

== Awards and honours ==
Roberts was elected a Fellow of the Royal Society (FRS) in 2015. His certificate of election reads:

Alan Roberts is a distinguished electrophysiologist, neuroanatomist and student of animal behaviour. His sustained investigation of the circuitry that underlies behaviour in amphibian tadpoles has transformed our understanding of a spinal network generating rhythmic movement and its regulation by sensory and descending inputs. Inspired by Coghill to work with simple networks in an embryonic vertebrate, his detailed cell by cell analysis provides unique insights into the developmental origins of connectivity and its functional significance.
