= Theodore Holmes Bullock =

American neuroscientist

Ted Bullock
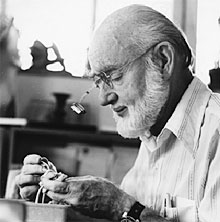
- Ted Bullock, early 1990s
- Born: Theodore Holmes Bullock; May 16, 1915
- Died: December 20, 2005 (aged 90)
- Education: University of California, Berkeley (PhD)
- Awards: Member of the National Academy of Sciences (1963)
- Scientific career
- Fields: Neurobiology; Neuroethology
- Workplaces: University of California, Los Angeles; Scripps Institution of Oceanography; Yale University; University of Missouri
- Thesis: The nervous system of balanoglossids (1940)
- Doctoral advisor: S. F. Light
- Doctoral students: Alan M. Roberts, Eric Knudsen

Theodore Holmes Bullock (16 May 1915 – 20 December 2005) is one of the founding fathers of neuroethology. During a career spanning nearly seven decades, this American academic was esteemed both as a pioneering and influential neuroscientist, examining the physiology and evolution of the nervous system across organizational levels, and as a champion of the comparative approach, studying species from nearly all major animal groups—coelenterates, annelids, arthropods, echinoderms, molluscs, and chordates.

Bullock discovered the pit organ in pit vipers and electroreceptors in weakly electric fish, as well as other electrosensory animals. His work on the jamming avoidance response in electric fish (work later carried on by Walter Heiligenberg) is an excellent example of how motor programs are integrated with incoming sensory information when generating a behavior pattern in response to a stimulus.

Bullock appealed to the scientific community to look beyond established paradigms in neuroscience, as well as to consider the ecology of an animal when endeavoring to understand its nervous system. As he once wrote, “Neuroscience is part of biology, more specifically of zoology, and it suffers tunnel vision unless continuous with ethology, ecology, and evolution”.

In his quest to go beyond a descriptive account of the nervous system, Bullock studied many different and unrelated, species. He believed that this "comparative approach" would reveal both general principles of the nervous system, and offer insights into which nervous system properties (anatomical, physiological, and chemical) were relevant to observed differences in species-specific traits, as well as which specific traits were relevant to observed differences in nervous systems. His resulting discoveries helped explain various properties of nervous systems. In one influential review he wrote, “Comparative neuroscience is likely to reach insights so novel as to constitute revolutions in understanding the structure, functions, ontogeny, and evolution of nervous systems. […] Without due consideration of the neural and behavioral correlates of differences between higher taxa and between closely related families, species, sexes, and stages, we cannot expect to understand nervous systems or ourselves”.

One colleague described Bullock as an “adventurous scientific explorer, continually seeking undiscovered phenomena and new unifying principles”. Until the very end of his life, at the age of 90, Bullock remained an active and influential presence in the fields of neuroscience and neuroethology.

== Biography ==
The second of four children, Bullock was born May 16, 1915, in Nanking, China. His parents, Amasa and Ruth Bullock (née Beckwith), were Presbyterian missionaries and had arrived in China in 1909. In 1928, when Bullock was thirteen, the family returned to the United States, and settled in Southern California. Bullock’s life as a neuroscientist began with histological studies of brain degeneration that he performed while still in high school. During this time he also studied marine biology and other courses at the Pomona College Marine Biological Laboratory. He received an Associate of Arts degree from Pasadena Junior College in 1934, and a BA from University of California, Berkeley in 1936, where he studied zoology. In 1937 Bullock married Martha Runquist, whom he remained married to until the end of his life, 68 years later. They had two children, Christine and Steve.

Bullock's doctorate work was performed at UC Berkeley under the supervision of S. F. Light, and focused on the organization of the nervous system (both anatomy and physiology) in acorn worms, generally considered a sister group to the chordates. This marked the beginning of his studies on simple nervous systems, which he used to explore the neural mechanisms that work together to produce an output in response to a stimulus, both at the physiological and behavioral level. During this time, the importance of comparative studies also became apparent to him. He believed that to fully understand how the brain and nervous system work, one must search for commonalities, and also for differences in nervous systems across different taxonomic levels. After earning his PhD in 1940, he accepted a postdoctoral fellowship, and later a teaching position at Yale. During his four years at Yale, Bullock worked at the Marine Biological Laboratory (MBL) at Woods Hole during the summers. Here he taught invertebrate zoology and their famous physiology course, and he studied nerve nets in coelenterates and the structure and physiology of giant nerve fibers in annelids. His studies on nerve nets lead him to be one of the first experimentalists to understand the value and importance of computational techniques for modeling and data analysis.

In 1944 Bullock accepted a faculty position at the University of Missouri, where he taught medical students anatomy and physiology. Two years later he joined the faculty at University of California, Los Angeles (UCLA), where he remained for the next twenty years. During this time, he helped pioneer the field of comparative and integrative neurobiology. In one series of famous experiments on the cardiac ganglion in lobsters, Bullock demonstrated that neurons can communicate not just via action potential and chemical synapse, but through non-synaptic interactions without such impulses. Today we know that this type of electrical interaction is mediated by gap junctions. This idea, that electrical synapses couple groups of cells into functional units, lead to Bullock’s lifelong interest in field potentials, which are generated by the summated electrical activity of millions of brain cells. Bullock was a respected teacher who taught many courses while at UCLA, such as zoology and advanced invertebrate biology. He spent the summers of 1955-1957 at Woods Hole as the director of the Invertebrate Zoology course.

In 1966 Bullock left UCLA to join the University of California, San Diego (UCSD) School of Medicine’s new Department of Neurosciences. He also served as the chairman of the Neurobiology Unit of Scripps Institution of Oceanography in La Jolla, CA. One reason for his move to UCSD was that he hoped to bridge the gap between Marine Biology and medicine.

Bullock published a vast array of papers. Other than the species previously mentioned, he also studied the nervous systems of corals, sea urchins, spirunculids, Limulus, Aplysia, starfish, rattlesnakes, rays, sharks, porpoises, sea lions, cuttlefish, catfish, sloths, manatees, salamanders, frogs, turtles, hagfish, crayfish, tuna, ratfish, bats, crabs, octopodes, snakes, rats and humans. In 1965 together with Adrian Horridge, Bullock published the seminal two-volume “bible of invertebrate neurobiology”: Structure and Function in the Nervous System of Invertebrates.

Bullock was known as an inspired teacher and mentor. More than 100 scientists passed through his laboratory as postdoctoral fellows and research associates. From 1949 to 1999, Bullock was the primary adviser for 36 graduating PhD students (17 at Scripps), and in 1982 he retired as a Professor Emeritus. However, retirement could not stop him from remaining at the forefront of comparative neuroscience. At the age of 88 Bullock re-established a modeling study on nerve-nets, and built a model that accurately predicted the input-output relationships for a range of different stimuli. Bullock maintained an active research laboratory and continued studying the anatomy and physiology of the nervous system up until his death, 20 December 2005.

== Notable awards and positions ==
- 1950–51, Fulbright scholarship, The Zoological Station, Naples, Italy
- 1955–56, President, The American Association of University Professors
- 1961, Elected as a member, The American Academy of Arts and Sciences
- 1963, Admitted into the National Academy of Sciences (NAS), served as chair of the NAS Zoology Section, and when it was later dissolved he became chair of the new Section of Neurobiology
- 1965, President, The American Society of Zoologists (now the Society for Integrative and Comparative Biology (SICB))
- 1968, Karl Spencer Lashley Award, The American Philosophical Society
- 1970, Elected as a member, The American Philosophical Society
- 1973, Queen’s Fellow in Marine Biology, Australia
- 1973-4, Third president of The Society for Neuroscience
- 1984, First president of the International Society for Neuroethology
- 1984, Ralph W. Gerard Prize in Neuroscience, The Society for Neuroscience
- 1988, Honorary Doctorate, University of Frankfurt
- 2000, Honorary Doctorate, University of Loyola Chicago

== Bibliography ==
- Aguilera, M. (1-3-2006), "Obituary Notice- Renowned Neurobiologist: Theodore Bullock," https://web.archive.org/web/20060901120040/http://ucsdnews.ucsd.edu/newsrel/science/bullock_obituary.asp
- Kristan, B. (March 2006), "Theodore Holmes Bullock, An Appreciation," International Neuroethology Society newsletter, https://web.archive.org/web/20070808195607/http://www.neuroethology.org/newsletter/news_archive/mar_06.pdf
- Pearce, J. (1-9-2006), "Theodore H. Bullock, Animal researcher, is dead at 90," New York Times
- Zupanc, G.K.H. (2004), Behavioral Neurobiology: An Integrative Approach, Oxford University Press: Oxford, UK.
- Preuss, T.M. & Kaas, J. (2006), Evolution of the Nervous System, Burlington MA: Academic Press.
- Bullock’s UCSD profile page, with a list of his publications: https://web.archive.org/web/20060525151009/http://myprofile.cos.com/bullockt82s
- Bullock's autobiography: https://web.archive.org/web/20080821155756/http://cogprints.org/130/0/Autobiog.htm
