= Stephen Cusack (biologist) =

British biologist

Stephen Cusack FRS
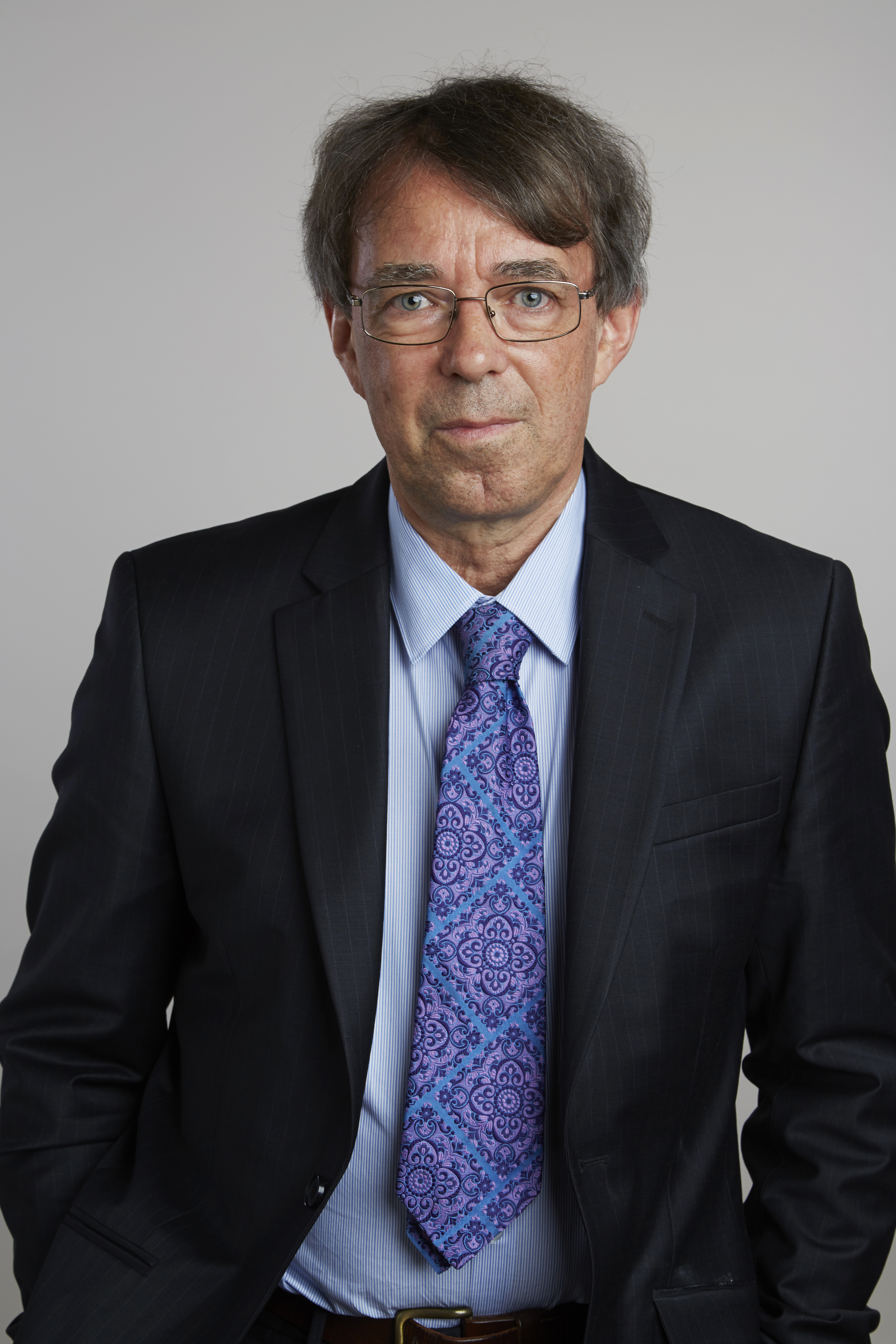
- Cusack in 2015
- Born: Stephen Anthony Cusack
- Education: Imperial College London
- Awards: FRS (2015); EMBO Member
- Scientific career
- Workplaces: European Molecular Biology Laboratory
- Thesis: Electron Density and Pair Correlation Functions in Metals (1976)
- Website: embl.fr/research/unit/cusack

Stephen Anthony Cusack is a British biologist who is the former Head of the European Molecular Biology Laboratory (EMBL) site in Grenoble, France.

== Education ==
Cusack was educated at Imperial College London where he was awarded a PhD in 1976 for research on the Radial distribution function and electron density in metals.

== Awards and honours ==
Cusack was elected a Fellow of the Royal Society (FRS) in 2015. His certificate of election reads:

Stephen Cusack is internationally renowned for major contributions in three areas. He has elucidated the structure and function of protein-RNA complexes involved in RNA maturation, translation and pattern recognition. These are exemplified by work on amino acyl tRNA synthetases, crucial to protein synthesis in all living organisms and analyses of the innate immune recognition of pathogens. As head of the EMBL outstation in Grenoble he has played a pioneering role in the development of instrumentation for structural biology at the European Synchrotron Radiation Facility, benefiting the structural biology community throughout Europe, and he has recently played a wider role in Europe as a founder of the Instruct project. He has in addition made a series of seminal advances in our understanding of the structure and life cycle of viruses, with particular focus on therapeutic potential.

In 1998, Cusack was elected as a member of the European Molecular Biology Organization.
