= Max Planck Institute for Behavioral Physiology =

German research institute

Coordinates: 47°58′16″N 11°14′10″E

The former Max Planck Institute for Behavioral Physiology was located in Bulldern, Westphalia, Germany, moved to Seewiesen in 1957. It was one of 80 institutes in the Max Planck Society (Max Planck Gesellschaft).

== Background ==
A working group was founded in 1954 by Erich von Holst (Max Planck Institute for Oceanic biology, Wilhelmshaven) and Konrad Lorenz. In 1958 it moved into new buildings in Seewiesen. After working from 1951 to 1965, Irenaeus Eibl-Eibesfeldt became director of the institute in 1975. It became an independent institute 1987. In 1997 the Max Planck Society was required to cut its budget and four institutes, including the Behavioral Physiology unit, were chosen for closure, reportedly because their directors were nearing retirement and not due to any failures in scientific research. A part of it survived as the Max Planck Institute for Ornithology.

== Famous scientists ==
- Erich von Holst
- Irenaeus Eibl-Eibesfeldt
- Horst Mittelstaedt
