= Sensory map =

Areas of the brain

Sensory maps are areas of the brain which responds to sensory stimulation, and are spatially organized according to some feature of the sensory stimulation. In some cases the sensory map is simply a topographic representation of a sensory surface such as the skin, cochlea, or retina. In other cases it represents other stimulus properties resulting from neuronal computation and is generally ordered in a manner that reflects the periphery. An example is the somatosensory map which is a projection of the skin's surface in the brain that arranges the processing of tactile sensation. This type of somatotopic map is the most common, possibly because it allows for physically neighboring areas of the brain to react to physically similar stimuli in the periphery or because it allows for greater motor control.

The somatosensory cortex is adjacent to the primary motor cortex which is similarly mapped. Sensory maps may play an important role in facilitating motor responses. Other examples of sensory map organization may be that adjacent brain regions are related through proximity of the receptors that they process as in the map of the cochlea in the brain, or that similar features are processed as in the map of the feature detectors or the retinotopic map, or that time codes are used in organization as in the maps of an owl's sense of direction via interaural time difference between ears. These examples exist in contrast to non-mapped or randomly distributed patterns of processing.

== Neurobiology ==
Sensory maps are created primarily within the somatosensory cortex, also referred to as the sensory cortex. The central nervous system is attached to this cortex and all other parts of an organism’s body. Both the somatosensory cortex and the central nervous system are made up of neurons which create associations with each other to transmit electrical impulses throughout the body.

The central nervous system, when made aware of various stimuli without the body, sends signals to the brain. These signals are sent by different parts of the body e.g. the auditory system, system that uses touch, and visual system. Each system produces different sensory maps that are connected to analyze an organism’s surroundings more thoroughly. For one sensory system there are multiple maps that analyze the stimulus. These maps work together to glean spatial, characteristic, and action information from surroundings. An organism then acts based on the information they receive and already have. Scientists speculate that these nerve connections have grown increasingly over the lifetime of an organism and have also been genetically passed on by earlier generations.

== Functions ==
Mapped sensory processing areas are a complex phenomenon and must therefore serve an adaptive advantage as it is highly unlikely for complex phenomena to appear otherwise. Sensory maps are also very old in evolutionary history as they are nearly ubiquitous in all species of animals and are found for nearly all sensory systems. The dynamic nature of neurons, which collect sensory information to create these maps, allow different stimuli to change maps made by other sensory neurons in the past. Also, for one sensory system there can be multiple different maps working together to analyze different aspects of a stimulus. Some advantages of sensory maps have been elucidated by scientific exploration:

- Adaptation: Maps can be adjusted by stimuli outside of their originally being created. For example: if a sensory map has been made by visual stimulation, auditory stimuli, that expresses different information than seen before, can adjust the sensory map and make it more accurate in understanding of an organism’s surroundings. Sensory maps contain an adaptive characteristic that enables them to connect to many different neurons and still gain understanding of an organism’s environment. Nevertheless, sensory maps can be passed from generation to generation genetically.
- Filling In: When sensory stimulation is organized in the brain in some form of topographic pattern, then the animal might be able to “fill in” information that is missing using neighboring regions of the map since they will usually be activated together when all information is present. Loss of signal from one area can be filled in from adjacent areas of the brain if those areas are for physically related parts of the periphery. This is evident in animal studies where the neurons bordering a lesioned, or damaged, brain area (which used to process the sense of touch in a hand) to recover processing of that sensory region because they process information from adjacent hand areas.
- Lateral Inhibition: Lateral inhibition is an organizing principle, it allows contrast in many systems from the visual to the somatosensory. This means that if adjacent areas inhibit one another then stimulation which activates one brain region can simultaneously inhibit the adjoining brain regions to create a sharper resolution between stimuli. This is evident in the visual system of humans where sharp lines can be detected between bright and dark regions because of simple cells which inhibit their neighbors. Studies show that two different types of stimuli can send signals to the central nervous system and the most recent can alter the other stimulus. Building of sensory maps through sensory inhibition can be affected by timing a great deal. Recency and repetition between two stimuli that are associated with each other will adjust sensory maps to create the most accurate understanding of a person’s environment. Lateral inhibition also aides in discriminating between two different stimuli when they are supposed to be combined. For example, within a movie or video where the sound and images are supposed to be synchronous. If the sound is on different timing than that of the images on the screen, lateral inhibition helps a person to discriminate between when the sound and images were synchronous, and when they were synchronous.
- Summation: Organization also allows related stimuli to be summed in the neural assessment of sensory information. Examples of this are found in the summation of tactile inputs neurally or visual inputs under low light. in data analysis within sciences and corporations, because it exemplifies hierarchical order that generates efficiency.
- Behavioral Influence: Sensory maps are associated with motor reflexes that react to sensory information. In other words, the sensory and motor systems are intertwined with sensory maps. Reactions to stimuli are based upon a hierarchical system which organizes the most important stimuli to the least. The motor system then reacts or does not react based upon the level of importance.

== Types ==
=== Topographic maps ===
These maps may be thought of as a mapping of the surface of the body onto the brain structure. Phrased another way, topographic maps are organized in the neural system in a manner that is a projection of the sensory surface within the brain. This means that the organization in the periphery mirrors the order of the information processing in the brain. This organization can be somatotopic, as in the tactile sense of touch, or tonotopic, as in the ear, and the retinotopic map which is laid out in the brain as the cells are arranged on the retina. Neurons on the surface of the body have importance in our day to day life. There are more neurons connected to the parts of the surface of the body when the neuron’s roles are more important than other neurons in relation to our well-being.

Phantom limbs activate sensory maps according to scientists. Because there is no actual connection between the amputee limb and the rest of the body, it is assumed that when the limb was detached from the rest of the body the sensory maps which were created before the amputation, are still active and are being activated without an actual stimulus.

==== Examples ====
- Wilder Penfield discovered the original topographic map in the form of the internal somatosensory Homunculus. His work on human neural systems showed that the brain areas that processed tactile sensations are mapped in the same fashion that the body is laid out. This sensory map exaggerates certain regions that have many peripheral sense cells like the lips and hands while reduces the relative space for processing areas with few receptors like the back.
- Hair cells in the auditory system display tonotopic organization. This tonotopic arrangement means that cells are laid out to range from low frequency to high frequency and processed in that same organization within the brain.

=== Computational maps ===
These maps are organized entirely in the neural system or organized in a manner not present in the periphery. Sensory information for computational maps comes from auditory and visual stimuli. Thus, any auditory or visual information that is constructed by neural computation, which is when the brain relates two or more bits of information in order to obtain some new information from them, can combine to change the already existing sensory map to include the new information. Often these maps involve comparing, as in performing subtraction to get a time delay, two stimuli, like incoming sound information from different ears, in order to produce a valuable new bit of information about those stimuli, as in where they originated. The process just described takes place in the owl's neural system very rapidly.

==== Examples ====
- The Jeffres Map was a theory of how the brain might compute interaural time differences (ITD), or differences in time of stimulus arrival between the two ears. Jeffres was famous for producing a theoretical mechanism for making a place map out of timing information, this explained how some animals could appear to have a "look-up map" for where a sound came from. The neural system computes this ITD in the Owl Auditory System and the real neural system was found to almost exactly match the Jeffres Map theory. The Jeffres Map shows how ITD signals are used to determine distance and direction in the owl.
- Feature Detectors in a visual system are another example of computational maps. No part of the physical system in the eyes actually analyzes for features like simple cells in the brain do. This system is well studied in frogs. It is known that frogs detect specific "worm-like" features in their environment and, controlled entirely by the neural system, will lunge at them even if they are a series of white squares in a line imitating a basic worm. Creating illusions within our sensory maps is a way that organisms fill in for unknown information about their surroundings.
- There is also a Frequency Modulation to Frequency Modulation Comparison in the Bat Auditory System which is used in echolocation. This FM-FM comparison determines flutter of their target and was made famous in work by Suga.
- When motor and sensory systems were studied by way of fish, scientists found that there could be computational maps made between the two. Fish whose central nervous system was inactivated, for a specific appendage, adjusted their previous natural behavior. Scientists believe that sensory information often precedes the actions and decisions made by organisms. Thus, when there is additional information given by outside stimuli, or lack of it, their behavior changes to adapt to new surroundings.

== Abstract maps ==
Abstract maps are maps that are also created by stimuli outside of an organism, but it has no surface by which it creates a map in the brain. They are ordered like topographical and computational maps, but their features are abstract. These types of maps are associated with seeing color.
