= Erich von Holst =

German behavioral physiologist

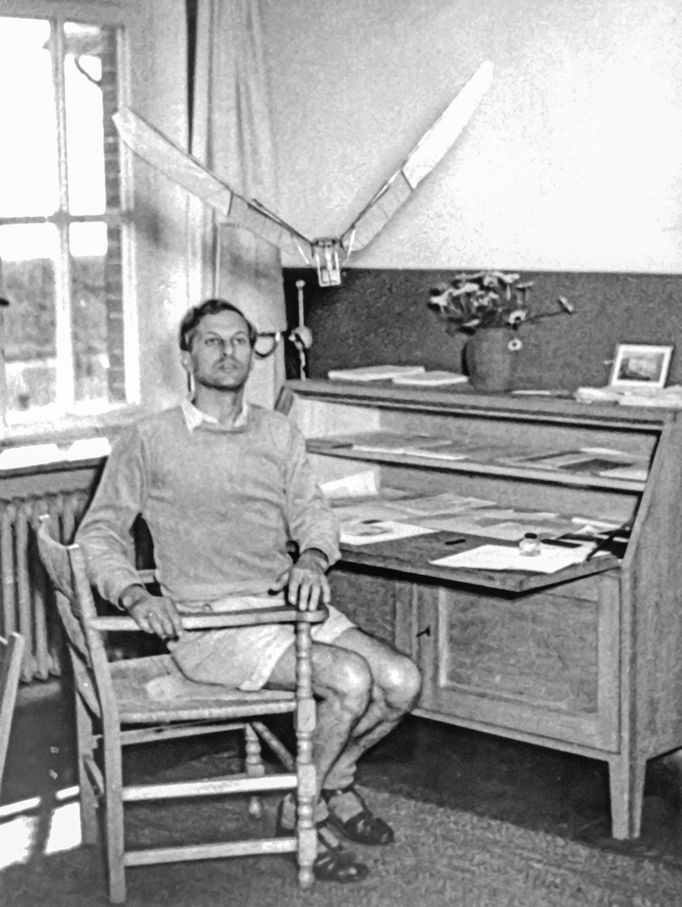
Erich von holst studying a model in flight

Erich Walther von Holst (28 November 1908 – 26 May 1962) was a German behavioral physiologist who was a Baltic German native of Riga, Livonia and was related to historian Hermann Eduard von Holst (1841–1904). In the 1950s he founded the Max Planck Institute for Behavioral Physiology at Seewiesen, Bavaria.

== Background ==
Holst is remembered for his work with zoologist Konrad Lorenz (1903–1989) concerning the processes of endogenous generation of stimuli and of central coordination as a basis of behavioral physiology. This idea refuted the existing "reflex theory" which stated that this behavior was based on a chain of reflexes.

Holst postulated that the basic central nervous configuration consisted of a "cell" permanently producing endogenous stimulation, but prevented from activating its effector by another "cell" that also produced endogenous stimulation which contained an inhibition effect. This inhibiting "second cell" was influenced by the receptor, and stopped its inhibitory functionality precisely at the biologically right moment. In this fashion, normal physiological stability was achieved.

From his studies of fish that use rhythmic, synchronized fin motions while maintaining an immobile body, he developed two fundamental principles to describe the coordinative properties of "neural oscillators":

- Beharrungstendenz: a tendency of an oscillator to maintain a steady rhythm. This would include movements such as breathing, chewing, and running, which Holst called states of absolute coordination.
- Magneteffekt: described as an effect that one oscillator exercises over another oscillator of a different frequency so that it appears "magnetically" to draw and couple it to its own frequency.

The result of the interaction and struggle between Beharrungstendenz and Magneteffekt create an infinite number of variable couplings, and in essence form a state of relative coordination.

In 1950, with Horst Mittelstaedt, Holst demonstrated the "Reafference Principle" (Das Reafferenzprinzip) concerning how an organism is able to separate reafferent (self-generated) sensory stimuli from exafferent (externally generated) sensory stimuli. This concept largely dealt with interactive processes between the central nervous system and its periphery.

At the University of Göttingen, Holst did extensive research involving the mechanics of winged flight, and constructed numerous lifelike replicas of birds and other flying creatures, which included models of pterosaurs and dragonflies.

With earthworms, Holst demonstrated internal, autonomous, rhythmic behavior that is independent of environmental factors. By slicing a worm into separate segments, and attaching each segment to a sensitive voltmeter, he noticed distinct, consecutive deflections on the meter which demonstrated a potential wave moving through the severed parts from the front to the end of the entire cut-up specimen at approximately the speed of a contraction wave of a wriggling earthworm.

He died in Herrsching am Ammersee, West Germany.
